= David Foster discography =

David Foster has been credited with composing, producing, arranging, performing, programming numerous singles and albums.

== Albums ==
=== Studio albums ===
Year	Title	Song	Composer	Label
1972	Skylark (as Skylark)	"Brother Eddie"		Capitol
1972	Skylark (as Skylark)	"What Would I Do Without You"		Capitol
1972	Skylark (as Skylark)	"A Long Way to Go"		Capitol
1972	Skylark (as Skylark)	"Suites for My Lady"	Yes	Capitol
1972	Skylark (as Skylark)	"I'll Have to Go Away"		Capitol
1972	Skylark (as Skylark)	"The Writing's on the Wall"		Capitol
1972	Skylark (as Skylark)	"Twenty-Six Years"	Yes	Capitol
1972	Skylark (as Skylark)	"I'm in Love Again"		Capitol
1972	Skylark (as Skylark)	"Wildflower"		Capitol
1972	Skylark (as Skylark)	"Shall I Fail"		Capitol
1974	2 (as Skylark)	"You Remind Me of a Friend"		Capitol
1974	2 (as Skylark)	"Love's a River Flowing"		Capitol
1974	2 (as Skylark)	"It's a Wonder"		Capitol
1974	2 (as Skylark)	"Wingless Bird"		Capitol
1974	2 (as Skylark)	"Wildflower"		Capitol
1974	2 (as Skylark)	"If That's The Way You Want It"		Capitol
1974	2 (as Skylark)	"Foster Frees"	Yes	Capitol
1974	2 (as Skylark)	"The Love Affair Is Over"		Capitol
1974	2 (as Skylark)	"One More Mountain to Climb"		Capitol
1975	Attitudes (as Attitudes)	"Ain't Love Enough"	Yes	Dark Horse
1975	Attitudes (as Attitudes)	"Street Scene"		Dark Horse
1975	Attitudes (as Attitudes)	"A Moment"	Yes	Dark Horse
1975	Attitudes (as Attitudes)	"You And I Are So In Love"		Dark Horse
1975	Attitudes (as Attitudes)	"Squank"	Yes	Dark Horse
1975	Attitudes (as Attitudes)	"Lend A Hand"		Dark Horse
1975	Attitudes (as Attitudes)	"Chump Chance Romeo"		Dark Horse
1975	Attitudes (as Attitudes)	"First Ballad"	Yes	Dark Horse
1975	Attitudes (as Attitudes)	"Honey Don't Leave L.A."		Dark Horse
1975	Attitudes (as Attitudes)	"In The Flow Of Love"		Dark Horse
1977	Good News (as Attitudes)	"Being Here with You"	Yes	Dark Horse
1977	Good News (as Attitudes)	"Drink My Water"		Dark Horse
1977	Good News (as Attitudes)	"Sweet Summer Music"		Dark Horse
1977	Good News (as Attitudes)	"Let's Talk Turkey"		Dark Horse
1977	Good News (as Attitudes)	"Foster's Frees"	Yes	Dark Horse
1977	Good News (as Attitudes)	"Turning in Space"		Dark Horse
1977	Good News (as Attitudes)	"Change"		Dark Horse
1977	Good News (as Attitudes)	"In a Stranger's Arms"		Dark Horse
1977	Good News (as Attitudes)	"Manual Dexterity"		Dark Horse
1977	Good News (as Attitudes)	"Promise Me the Moon"		Dark Horse
1977	Good News (as Attitudes)	"Good News"		Dark Horse
1980	Airplay (as Airplay)	"Stranded"	Yes	RCA
1980	Airplay (as Airplay)	"Cryin' All Night"	Yes	RCA
1980	Airplay (as Airplay)	"It Will Be Alright"	Yes	RCA
1980	Airplay (as Airplay)	"Nothin' You Can Do About It"	Yes	RCA
1980	Airplay (as Airplay)	"Should We Carry On"	Yes	RCA
1980	Airplay (as Airplay)	"Leave Me Alone"	Yes	RCA
1980	Airplay (as Airplay)	"Sweet Body"	Yes	RCA
1980	Airplay (as Airplay)	"Bix"	Yes	RCA
1980	Airplay (as Airplay)	"She Waits For Me"		RCA
1980	Airplay (as Airplay)	"After The Love Is Gone"	Yes	RCA
1983	The Best of Me	"Whatever We Imagine"	Yes	Sound Design
1983	The Best of Me	"Our Romance"	Yes	Sound Design
1983	The Best of Me	"Chaka"	Yes	Sound Design
1983	The Best of Me	"Heart Strings"	Yes	Sound Design
1983	The Best of Me	"The Dancer"	Yes	Sound Design
1983	The Best of Me	"The Best Of Me"	Yes	Sound Design
1983	The Best of Me	"Mornin'"	Yes	Sound Design
1983	The Best of Me	"Love, Look What You've Done To Me"	Yes	Sound Design
1983	The Best of Me	"Love At Second Sight"	Yes	Sound Design
1983	The Best of Me	"Night Music"	Yes	Sound Design
1986	David Foster	"Love Theme From St. Elmo's Fire (Instrumental)"	Yes	Atlantic
1986	David Foster	"Theme From The Color Purple (Mailbox / Proud Theme)"		Atlantic
1986	David Foster	"Flight Of The Snowbirds"	Yes	Atlantic
1986	David Foster	"All That My Heart Can Hold"	Yes	Atlantic
1986	David Foster	"The Best Of Me" (duet with Olivia Newton-John)	Yes	Atlantic
1986	David Foster	"Tapdance"	Yes	Atlantic
1986	David Foster	"Who's Gonna Love You Tonight"	Yes	Atlantic
1986	David Foster	"Elizabeth"	Yes	Atlantic
1986	David Foster	"Playing With Fire"	Yes	Atlantic
1986	David Foster	"Sajé"	Yes	Atlantic
1988	The Symphony Sessions (with Vancouver Symphony Orchestra)	"Piano Concerto In G"	Yes	Atlantic
1988	The Symphony Sessions (with Vancouver Symphony Orchestra)	"The Ballet"	Yes	Atlantic
1988	The Symphony Sessions (with Vancouver Symphony Orchestra)	"Time Passing"	Yes	Atlantic
1988	The Symphony Sessions (with Vancouver Symphony Orchestra)	"Conscience"	Yes	Atlantic
1988	The Symphony Sessions (with Vancouver Symphony Orchestra)	"Firedance"	Yes	Atlantic
1988	The Symphony Sessions (with Vancouver Symphony Orchestra)	"Winter Games"	Yes	Atlantic
1988	The Symphony Sessions (with Vancouver Symphony Orchestra)	"Water Fountain (Love Theme From Secret Of My Success)"	Yes	Atlantic
1988	The Symphony Sessions (with Vancouver Symphony Orchestra)	"Just Out Of Reach"	Yes	Atlantic
1988	The Symphony Sessions (with Vancouver Symphony Orchestra)	"Morning To Morning"	Yes	Atlantic
1988	The Symphony Sessions (with Vancouver Symphony Orchestra)	"We Were So Close"	Yes	Atlantic
1990	River of Love	"River Of Love"	Yes	Atlantic
1990	River of Love	"Walk Away"		Atlantic
1990	River of Love	"This Must Be Love"	Yes	Atlantic
1990	River of Love	"Is There A Chance"	Yes	Atlantic
1990	River of Love	"Freedom"	Yes	Atlantic
1990	River of Love	"Grown-Up Christmas List"	Yes	Atlantic
1990	River of Love	"You're The Voice"		Atlantic
1990	River of Love	"Living For The Moment"	Yes	Atlantic
1990	River of Love	"All I Ever Needed"	Yes	Atlantic
1990	River of Love	"One Step Closer"	Yes	Atlantic
1990	River of Love	"Inside You"	Yes	Atlantic
1991	Rechordings	"Love, Look What You've Done To Me"	Yes	Atlantic
1991	Rechordings	"You're The Inspiration"	Yes	Atlantic
1991	Rechordings	"After The Love Has Gone"	Yes	Atlantic
1991	Rechordings	"The Glory Of Love"	Yes	Atlantic
1991	Rechordings	"Who's Holding Donna Now?"	Yes	Atlantic
1991	Rechordings	"Voices That Care"	Yes	Atlantic
1991	Rechordings	"Man In Motion (St. Elmo's Fire)"	Yes	Atlantic
1991	Rechordings	"Freedom"	Yes	Atlantic
1991	Rechordings	"Hard To Say I'm Sorry"	Yes	Atlantic
1991	Rechordings	"Movie Montage"	Yes	Atlantic
1993	The Christmas Album	David Foster - "Carol Of The Bells (Instrumental)"		Interscope/Atlantic
1993	The Christmas Album	Wynonna - "Blue Christmas"		Interscope/Atlantic
1993	The Christmas Album	BeBe And CeCe Winans - "The First Noel"		Interscope/Atlantic
1993	The Christmas Album	Johnny Mathis - "It's The Most Wonderful Time Of The Year"		Interscope/Atlantic
1993	The Christmas Album	Natalie Cole - "Grown-Up Christmas List"	Yes	Interscope/Atlantic
1993	The Christmas Album	Michael Crawford - "O Holy Night"		Interscope/Atlantic
1993	The Christmas Album	Vanessa Williams - "Go Tell It On The Mountain / Mary Had A Baby"		Interscope/Atlantic
1993	The Christmas Album	Peabo Bryson And Roberta Flack - "I'll Be Home For Christmas"		Interscope/Atlantic
1993	The Christmas Album	Tom Jones - "Mary's Boy Child"		Interscope/Atlantic
1993	The Christmas Album	Celine Dion - "The Christmas Song (Chestnuts Roasting On An Open Fire)"		Interscope/Atlantic
1993	The Christmas Album	Tammy Wynette - "Away In A Manger"		Interscope/Atlantic
1993	The Christmas Album	David Foster And Friends - "White Christmas"		Interscope/Atlantic
1994	Love Lights the World	"Jelinda's Theme"		143/Atlantic
1994	Love Lights the World	"Forever Linda"	Yes	143/Atlantic
1994	Love Lights the World	"JEBBAS"	Yes	143/Atlantic
1994	Love Lights the World	"Listen To The Children"	Yes	143/Atlantic
1994	Love Lights the World	"Small Hands Reach Out"	Yes	143/Atlantic
1994	Love Lights the World	"The Colour Of My Love"	Yes	143/Atlantic
1994	Love Lights the World	"Live Each Day (Ben's Song)"	Yes	143/Atlantic
1994	Love Lights the World	"Ice Dance"	Yes	143/Atlantic
1994	Love Lights the World	"I'm Only Here For A While"	Yes	143/Atlantic
1994	Love Lights the World	"Allegro"	Yes	143/Atlantic
1994	Love Lights the World	"Love Lights The World"	Yes	143/Atlantic
2020	Eleven Words	"Everlasting"	Yes	Decca
2020	Eleven Words	"Love"	Yes	Decca
2020	Eleven Words	"Eternity"		Decca
2020	Eleven Words	"Victorious"	Yes	Decca
2020	Eleven Words	"Elegant"	Yes	Decca
2020	Eleven Words	"Nobility"	Yes	Decca
2020	Eleven Words	"Wonderment"	Yes	Decca
2020	Eleven Words	"Orbiting"	Yes	Decca
2020	Eleven Words	"Romance"		Decca
2020	Eleven Words	"Dreams"	Yes	Decca
2020	Eleven Words	"Serenity"	Yes	Decca
2022	Christmas Songs (as David Foster and Katharine McPhee)	"Jingle Bell Rock"		Loma Vista
2022	Christmas Songs (as David Foster and Katharine McPhee)	"Rudolph The Red-Nosed Reindeer"		Loma Vista
2022	Christmas Songs (as David Foster and Katharine McPhee)	"My Grown-Up Christmas List"	Yes	Loma Vista
2022	Christmas Songs (as David Foster and Katharine McPhee)	"Blue Christmas"		Loma Vista
2022	Christmas Songs (as David Foster and Katharine McPhee)	"Santa Claus Is Coming To Town"		Loma Vista
2022	Christmas Songs (as David Foster and Katharine McPhee)	"I'll Be Home For Christmas"		Loma Vista
2022	Christmas Songs (as David Foster and Katharine McPhee)	"The Christmas Song"		Loma Vista

=== Live albums ===
Year	Title	Label
2008	Hit Man: David Foster & Friends	143 Records, Reprise
2011	Hit Man Returns: David Foster & Friends	Reprise
2019	An Intimate Evening	Decca

=== Compilation albums ===
Year	Title	Label
1989	Time Passing	Atlantic
1992	A Touch of David Foster	Atlantic
1998	Selecciones Latinas	peermusic
2002	The Best of Me: A Collection of David Foster's Greatest Works	143, Atlantic
2010	The Magic of David Foster & Friends	143, Atlantic
2012	The Best of Celine Dion & David Foster	Columbia
2015	The Many Sides of David Foster	Universal Music

=== Soundtrack albums ===
Year	Title	Label
1997	EVE Original Soundtrack	Epic

=== Video works ===
Year	Title	Detail	Format	Label
1985	Love Theme from St Elmo's Fire (Official Music Video)			unreleased
1986	The Best Of Me (Official Music Video)	with Olivia Newton-John		unreleased
1986	Tears Are Not Enough (Documentary)	TV Program (CBC, 1985)	VHS, LD	VAP
1987	The Symphony Sessions	with Vancouver Symphony Orchestra	VHS, LD	Atlantic Video
1987	The Real Stuff (Documentary)	with Snowbirds, TV Program (CBC, 1987)		unreleased
1987	Rendez-Vous (Official Music Video)			unreleased
1987	Victory	TV ad for Beer (Coors)		unreleased
1988	And When She Danced (Official Music Video)			unreleased
1991	Voices that Care (Documentary)			unreleased
1991	A David Foster Christmas Card	TV Program (CBC, 1989)	VHS, LD	Victor
1992	The Bodyguard (cast as Conductor)	Movie	Stream, DVD, Blu-ray	Warner
1992	David Foster's Twilight Orchestra	TV Program (RCTI, 1992)		unreleased
1993	David Foster's Christmas Album	TV Program (NBC, 1993)		unreleased
1994	JT Super Producers ’94 (Concert in Japan)	TV Program (NTV, 1994)		unreleased
2002	The Concert For World Children's Day	TV Program (ABC, 2002)	DVD	McDonald's
2005	The Princes of Malibu	TV Program (FOX, 2005)	Stream, DVD	GRB Studios
2006	Under The Desert Sky	with Andrea Bocelli, TV Program (PBS, 2006)	DVD	Decca
2008	Hit Man: David Foster & Friends	TV Program (PBS, 2008)	DVD, Blu-ray	143 Records, Reprise
2008	I Will Be There with You	TV ad for First Class (JAL)		unreleased
2009	My Christmas	with Andrea Bocelli, TV Program (PBS, 2009)	DVD	Universal
2011	Hit Man Returns: David Foster & Friends	TV Program (PBS, 2011)	DVD, Blu-ray	Reprise
2011	Concerto: One Night in Central Park	with Andrea Bocelli, TV Program (PBS, 2011)	DVD, Blu-ray	Decca, Universal
2011	Dream With Me In Concert	with Jackie Evancho, TV Program (PBS, 2011)	DVD, Blu-ray	Syco Music, Columbia
2015	Asia's Got Talent (cast as Judge)	TV Program (AXN Asia)		unreleased
2016	Emin: Live From Russia with David Foster	with Emin, TV Program (PBS, 2016)		unreleased
2017	Asia's Got Talent (cast as Judge)	TV Program (AXN Asia)		unreleased
2018	Kenny Loggins And Friends: Live On Soundstage	with Kenny Loggins, TV Program (WTTW, 2016)	DVD, Blu-ray, CD	BMG
2019	Asia's Got Talent (cast as Judge)	TV Program (AXN Asia)		unreleased
2019	An Intimate Evening with David Foster	TV Program (PBS, 2019)	CD	Decca
2019	David Foster: Off the Record (Documentary)			Stream

== Singles ==
Year	Title	Peak chart positions				Album
Year	Title	Canada Top Singles (RPM)	Canadian Digital Song Sales	U.S. Billboard Hot 100	U.S. Billboard Adult Contemporary	Album
1983	"The Best of Me"	—	—	—	—	The Best of Me
1984	"Night Music"	—	—	—	—	The Best of Me
1985	"Love Theme From St. Elmo's Fire (Instrumental)"	7	—	15	3	St. Elmo's Fire: Original Motion Picture Soundtrack
1986	"The Best of Me" (with Olivia Newton-John)	17	—	80	6	David Foster
1986	"Who's Gonna Love You Tonight"	75	—	—	38	David Foster
1987	"Rendez-Vous (vocal version)" (with Red Army Choir)	—	—	—	—	single only
1988	"Winter Games"	21	—	85	28	The Symphony Sessions
1988	"And When She Danced (Love Theme From Stealing Home)" (with Marilyn Martin)	73	—	—	—	Stealing Home
1990	"Grown-Up Christmas List" (featuring Natalie Cole)	—	—	—	—	River of Love
1991	"River of Love"	71	—	—	—	River of Love
1994	"Love Lights the World"	—	—	—	—	Love Lights the World
2001	"O Canada 2001" (with The Vancouver Symphony and Lara Fabian)	—	3	—	—	singles only
2003	"Teko's Theme" (featuring Nita Whitaker)	—	—	—	—	singles only
2023	"Carol of the Bells" (with Katharine McPhee)	—	—	—	10	singles only

== Production credits ==
=== Songs ===
Foster has been credited with composing (only for first released version, not include cover version except performed or produced by Foster himself), producing, arranging, performing on the following songs: (not include sampling)

70s

Year	Artist	Song	Album	Composer	Producer	Arranger	Keyboards
1970	Judy Singh	"Up and Down"	A Time For Love	Yes			
1970	Judy Singh	"Forever Waits Beyond"	A Time For Love	Yes			
1972	David Foster	"Listen To Daddy"	Unselfconsciously Canadian	Yes		Yes	Yes
1974	Ringo Starr	"Call Me"	Goodnight Vienna				Yes
1974	Eddie Reeves	"Lingo Song"	single only				Yes
1975	Tommy Bolin	"The Grind"	Teaser				Yes
1975	Tommy Bolin	"Homeward Strut"	Teaser				Yes
1975	Tommy Bolin	"Dreamer"	Teaser				Yes
1975	George Harrison	"You"	Extra Texture (Read All About It)				Yes
1975	George Harrison	"The Answer's at the End"	Extra Texture (Read All About It)			Yes	Yes
1975	George Harrison	"This Guitar (Can't Keep from Crying)"	Extra Texture (Read All About It)			Yes	Yes
1975	George Harrison	"World of Stone"	Extra Texture (Read All About It)				Yes
1975	George Harrison	"A Bit More of You"	Extra Texture (Read All About It)				Yes
1975	George Harrison	"Can't Stop Thinking About You"	Extra Texture (Read All About It)			Yes	Yes
1975	George Harrison	"Grey Cloudy Lies"	Extra Texture (Read All About It)				Yes
1975	George Harrison	"His Name Is Legs (Ladies and Gentlemen)"	Extra Texture (Read All About It)				Yes
1975	Nigel Olsson	"Something Lacking In Me"	Nigel Olsson	Yes		Yes	Yes
1975	Nigel Olsson	"Don't Break A Heart"	Nigel Olsson			Yes	Yes
1975	Nigel Olsson	"Tides"	Nigel Olsson			Yes	Yes
1975	Nigel Olsson	"Only One Woman"	Nigel Olsson			Yes	Yes
1975	Nigel Olsson	"Get It Up For Love"	Nigel Olsson			Yes	Yes
1975	Nigel Olsson	"Songs I Sing"	Nigel Olsson			Yes	Yes
1975	Nigel Olsson	"When You Close Your Eyes"	Nigel Olsson			Yes	Yes
1975	Nigel Olsson	"Girl, We've Got To Keep On"	Nigel Olsson	Yes		Yes	Yes
1975	Nigel Olsson	"A Girl Like You"	Nigel Olsson			Yes	Yes
1975	Nigel Olsson	"Something To Believe In"	Nigel Olsson			Yes	Yes
1975	Nigel Olsson	"Just Another Lie"	Nigel Olsson			Yes	Yes
1975	Nigel Olsson	"Can't You See"	Nigel Olsson	Yes		Yes	Yes
1975	Shawne Jackson	"Get Out Of The Kitchen"	Shawne Jackson			Yes	
1975	Shawne Jackson	"The Greatest Love"	Shawne Jackson			Yes	
1975	Erik Tagg	"Tell-Tale Eyes"	Smilin' Memories				Yes
1975	Erik Tagg	"Never Had The Feelin'"	Smilin' Memories				Yes
1975	Erik Tagg	"Hang On"	Smilin' Memories				Yes
1975	Bobby Womack	"Superstar"	I Don't Know What The World Is Coming To				Yes
1975	Bobby Womack	"Interlude #2"	I Don't Know What The World Is Coming To				Yes
1975	Lynyrd Skynyrd	"Whiskey Rock-a-Roller"	Nuthin' Fancy				Yes
1975	Keith Moon	"Move Over Ms. L"	Two Sides Of The Moon				Yes
1976	George Harrison	"Woman Don't You Cry for Me"	Thirty Three & 1/3				Yes
1976	George Harrison	"Learning How to Love You"	Thirty Three & 1/3				Yes
1976	Brian And Brenda Russell	"Please Pardon Me"	Word Called Love			Yes	Yes
1976	Brian And Brenda Russell	"Word Called Love"	Word Called Love			Yes	Yes
1976	Brian And Brenda Russell	"Labour Of Love"	Word Called Love			Yes	Yes
1976	Brian And Brenda Russell	"You'll Never Rock Alone"	Word Called Love			Yes	
1976	Brian And Brenda Russell	"Livin' With You"	Word Called Love			Yes	Yes
1976	Brian And Brenda Russell	"Tell Me When The Whistle Blows"	Word Called Love			Yes	
1976	Brian And Brenda Russell	"Highly Prized Possession"	Word Called Love			Yes	
1976	Brian And Brenda Russell	"Gonna Do My Best To Love You"	Word Called Love	Yes		Yes	
1976	Brian And Brenda Russell	"Backstreet Lovin"	Word Called Love			Yes	Yes
1976	Brian And Brenda Russell	"Stranger's Houses"	Word Called Love			Yes	Yes
1976	Brian And Brenda Russell	"A Player In The Band"	Word Called Love			Yes	Yes
1976	Barry De Vorzon	"Jelinda's Theme"	Nadia's Theme (The Young And The Restless)				Yes
1976	Barry De Vorzon	"Winter Song"	Nadia's Theme (The Young And The Restless)				Yes
1976	Barry De Vorzon	"This Masquerade"	Nadia's Theme (The Young And The Restless)				Yes
1976	Barry De Vorzon	"The Dancer"	Nadia's Theme (The Young And The Restless)				Yes
1976	Barry De Vorzon	"All By Myself"	Nadia's Theme (The Young And The Restless)				Yes
1976	Barry De Vorzon	"Shadows"	Nadia's Theme (The Young And The Restless)				Yes
1976	Barry De Vorzon	"Midnight"	Nadia's Theme (The Young And The Restless)				Yes
1976	Steve Marriott	"Star In My Life"	Marriott				Yes
1976	Steve Marriott	"Are You Lonely For Me Baby"	Marriott				Yes
1976	Steve Marriott	"You Don't Know Me"	Marriott				Yes
1976	Steve Marriott	"Late Night Lady"	Marriott				Yes
1976	Steve Marriott	"Early Evening Light"	Marriott				Yes
1976	Les Dudek	"What a Sacrifice"	Les Dudek				Yes
1976	Michel Polnareff	"Lipstick"	Lipstick: Original Soundtrack			Yes	
1976	Michel Polnareff	"The Rapist"	Lipstick: Original Soundtrack			Yes	
1976	Michel Polnareff	"Ballet"	Lipstick: Original Soundtrack			Yes	
1976	Ned Doheny	"Get It Up for Love"	Hard Candy				Yes
1976	Ned Doheny	"If You Should Fall"	Hard Candy				Yes
1976	Ned Doheny	"Each Time You Pray"	Hard Candy				Yes
1976	Ned Doheny	"A Love of Your Own"	Hard Candy				Yes
1976	Ned Doheny	"I’ve Got Your Number"	Hard Candy				Yes
1976	Ned Doheny	"On the Swingshift"	Hard Candy				Yes
1976	Ned Doheny	"Sing to Me"	Hard Candy				Yes
1976	Ned Doheny	"Valentine (I Was Wrong About You)"	Hard Candy				Yes
1976	Wendy Waldman	"West Coast Blues"	The Main Refrain				Yes
1976	Wendy Waldman	"Goodbye Summerwind"	The Main Refrain				Yes
1976	Wendy Waldman	"Back By Fall"	The Main Refrain				Yes
1976	Alphonso Johnson	"Love's the Way I Feel 'Bout Cha"	Yesterday's Dreams				Yes
1976	Cate Bros.	"Start All Over Again"	In One Eye And Out The Other				Yes
1976	Cate Bros.	"In One Eye And Out The Other"	In One Eye And Out The Other				Yes
1976	Cate Bros.	"Travelin' Man"	In One Eye And Out The Other				Yes
1976	Cate Bros.	"Give It All To You"	In One Eye And Out The Other				Yes
1976	Cate Bros.	"Let's Just Let It Be"	In One Eye And Out The Other				Yes
1976	Cate Bros.	"Where Can We Go"	In One Eye And Out The Other				Yes
1976	Erick Nelson	"Flow River Flow"	Flow River Flow				Yes
1976	Erick Nelson	"Soldiers Of The Cross"	Flow River Flow				Yes
1976	Erick Nelson	"Prelude"	Flow River Flow				Yes
1976	Erick Nelson	"The Gift"	Flow River Flow				Yes
1976	Erick Nelson	"Sunlight"	Flow River Flow				Yes
1976	Erick Nelson	"Movin' On"	Flow River Flow				Yes
1976	Erick Nelson	"Beside You"	Flow River Flow				Yes
1976	Erick Nelson	"One Last Night"	Flow River Flow				Yes
1976	Erick Nelson	"Prodigal's Return"	Flow River Flow				Yes
1976	Guthrie Thomas	"Fifty-Five"	Lies And Alibis				Yes
1976	Guthrie Thomas	"Good Days Are Rollin' In"	Lies And Alibis				Yes
1976	Guthrie Thomas	"For A While"	Lies And Alibis				Yes
1976	Guthrie Thomas	"Yesterdays and Tomorrows"	Lies And Alibis				Yes
1976	Guthrie Thomas	"Ramblin' Cocaine Blues"	Lies And Alibis				Yes
1976	The Bottom Line	"That's The Way To Go"	Crazy Dancin	Yes			Yes
1976	The Bottom Line	"Gonna Do My Best To Love You"	Crazy Dancin	Yes			Yes
1976	Jaye P.Morgan	"I Fall In Love Everyday"	Jaye P.Morgan		Yes	Yes	Yes
1976	Jaye P.Morgan	"Keepin' It To Myself"	Jaye P.Morgan		Yes	Yes	Yes
1976	Jaye P.Morgan	"Here Is Where Your Love Belongs"	Jaye P.Morgan		Yes	Yes	Yes
1976	Jaye P.Morgan	"Closet Man"	Jaye P.Morgan	Yes	Yes	Yes	Yes
1976	Jaye P.Morgan	"It's Been So Long"	Jaye P.Morgan		Yes	Yes	Yes
1976	Jaye P.Morgan	"Let's Get Together"	Jaye P.Morgan		Yes	Yes	Yes
1976	Jaye P.Morgan	"Can't Hide Love"	Jaye P.Morgan		Yes	Yes	Yes
1976	Jaye P.Morgan	"You're All I Need To Get By"	Jaye P.Morgan		Yes	Yes	Yes
1976	Jaye P.Morgan	"It All Goes Round"	Jaye P.Morgan	Yes	Yes	Yes	Yes
1976	Peter Foldy	"Roxanne"	single only				Yes
1976	Peter Foldy	"Funny"	single only				Yes
1977	Ringo Starr	"Sneaking Sally Through the Alley"	Ringo The 4th				Yes
1977	Ringo Starr	"Simple Love Song"	Ringo The 4th				Yes
1977	Diana Ross	"Baby It's Me"	Baby It's Me			Yes	
1977	Rod Stewart	"(If Loving You Is Wrong) I Don't Want To Be Right"	Foot Loose & Fancy Free				Yes
1977	The Keane Brothers	"Help! Help!"	Keane Brothers		Yes	Yes	Yes
1977	The Keane Brothers	"The Ugly One"	Keane Brothers		Yes	Yes	Yes
1977	The Keane Brothers	"Goodbye Summer"	Keane Brothers		Yes	Yes	Yes
1977	The Keane Brothers	"God Loves Little Girls"	Keane Brothers		Yes	Yes	Yes
1977	The Keane Brothers	"I Wanna Get Back On The Floor And Boogie"	Keane Brothers		Yes	Yes	Yes
1977	The Keane Brothers	"Keep On Rollin'"	Keane Brothers		Yes	Yes	Yes
1977	The Keane Brothers	"Sherry"	Keane Brothers		Yes	Yes	Yes
1977	The Keane Brothers	"Come On Home Country Boy"	Keane Brothers		Yes	Yes	Yes
1977	The Keane Brothers	"Amy (Show The World You're There)"	Keane Brothers		Yes	Yes	Yes
1977	The Keane Brothers	"Goodbye Momma And Poppa"	Keane Brothers		Yes	Yes	Yes
1977	Danny Peck	"Halo Of Fire"	Heart And Soul		Yes	Yes	Yes
1977	Danny Peck	"Looking So Hard"	Heart And Soul		Yes	Yes	Yes
1977	Danny Peck	"The Smoke Is Rising"	Heart And Soul		Yes	Yes	Yes
1977	Danny Peck	"Dream Girl"	Heart And Soul		Yes	Yes	Yes
1977	Danny Peck	"Brother Of Mine"	Heart And Soul		Yes	Yes	Yes
1977	Danny Peck	"This Could Be A Real Nice Place"	Heart And Soul		Yes	Yes	Yes
1977	Danny Peck	"I Do"	Heart And Soul		Yes	Yes	Yes
1977	Danny Peck	"Take Your Baby Home"	Heart And Soul		Yes	Yes	Yes
1977	Danny Peck	"That's The Way It Is"	Heart And Soul		Yes	Yes	Yes
1977	Danny Peck	"Where Is My Heart"	Heart And Soul		Yes	Yes	Yes
1977	Lisa Dal Bello	"Look at Me (Millions of People)"	Lisa Dal Bello		Yes	Yes	Yes
1977	Lisa Dal Bello	"(Don't Want to) Stand in Your Way"	Lisa Dal Bello		Yes	Yes	Yes
1977	Lisa Dal Bello	"My Mind's Made Up"	Lisa Dal Bello	Yes	Yes	Yes	Yes
1977	Lisa Dal Bello	"Snow White"	Lisa Dal Bello		Yes	Yes	Yes
1977	Lisa Dal Bello	"Touch Me"	Lisa Dal Bello		Yes	Yes	Yes
1977	Lisa Dal Bello	"Talk It Over (Even Though My Body's Cold)"	Lisa Dal Bello		Yes	Yes	Yes
1977	Lisa Dal Bello	"Stay with Me"	Lisa Dal Bello		Yes	Yes	Yes
1977	Lisa Dal Bello	"Day Dream"	Lisa Dal Bello	Yes	Yes	Yes	Yes
1977	Lisa Dal Bello	"Milk & Honey"	Lisa Dal Bello	Yes	Yes	Yes	Yes
1977	Lisa Dal Bello	"Everything Money Can Buy"	Lisa Dal Bello		Yes	Yes	Yes
1977	Doonesbury's Jimmy Thudpucker	"You Can't Fight It"	Doonesbury's Jimmy Thudpucker And The Walden West Rhythm Section Greatest Hits (The composer was credited as a fictitious character. Foster probably composed most of the songs)			Yes	Yes
1977	Doonesbury's Jimmy Thudpucker	"Take Your Life"	Doonesbury's Jimmy Thudpucker And The Walden West Rhythm Section Greatest Hits (The composer was credited as a fictitious character. Foster probably composed most of the songs)			Yes	Yes
1977	Doonesbury's Jimmy Thudpucker	"I Don't Know My Love"	Doonesbury's Jimmy Thudpucker And The Walden West Rhythm Section Greatest Hits (The composer was credited as a fictitious character. Foster probably composed most of the songs)			Yes	Yes
1977	Doonesbury's Jimmy Thudpucker	"Stop"	Doonesbury's Jimmy Thudpucker And The Walden West Rhythm Section Greatest Hits (The composer was credited as a fictitious character. Foster probably composed most of the songs)			Yes	Yes
1977	Doonesbury's Jimmy Thudpucker	"Indian Brown"	Doonesbury's Jimmy Thudpucker And The Walden West Rhythm Section Greatest Hits (The composer was credited as a fictitious character. Foster probably composed most of the songs)			Yes	Yes
1977	Doonesbury's Jimmy Thudpucker	"Where Can I Go"	Doonesbury's Jimmy Thudpucker And The Walden West Rhythm Section Greatest Hits (The composer was credited as a fictitious character. Foster probably composed most of the songs)			Yes	Yes
1977	Doonesbury's Jimmy Thudpucker	"I Do Believe"	Doonesbury's Jimmy Thudpucker And The Walden West Rhythm Section Greatest Hits (The composer was credited as a fictitious character. Foster probably composed most of the songs)			Yes	Yes
1977	Doonesbury's Jimmy Thudpucker	"Fretman Sam"	Doonesbury's Jimmy Thudpucker And The Walden West Rhythm Section Greatest Hits (The composer was credited as a fictitious character. Foster probably composed most of the songs)			Yes	Yes
1977	Doonesbury's Jimmy Thudpucker	"Ginny's Song"	Doonesbury's Jimmy Thudpucker And The Walden West Rhythm Section Greatest Hits (The composer was credited as a fictitious character. Foster probably composed most of the songs)			Yes	Yes
1977	Doonesbury's Jimmy Thudpucker	"So Long / Overture '73"	Doonesbury's Jimmy Thudpucker And The Walden West Rhythm Section Greatest Hits (The composer was credited as a fictitious character. Foster probably composed most of the songs)			Yes	Yes
1977	Kenny Loggins	"Daddy's Back"	Celebrate Me Home	Yes			
1977	Lee Ritenour	"Isn't She Lovely"	Captain Fingers				Yes
1977	Lee Ritenour	"Space Glide"	Captain Fingers				Yes
1977	Harvey Mason	"Till You Take My Love"	Funk In A Mason Jar	Yes		Yes	Yes
1977	Harvey Mason	"Freedom Either Way"	Funk In A Mason Jar				Yes
1977	Becky Hobbs	"Everyday"	Everyday				Yes
1977	Becky Hobbs	"Love Enough"	Everyday				Yes
1977	Becky Hobbs	"All That I Am"	Everyday				Yes
1977	Jaisún	"I Fall In Love Everyday"	Jaisún			Yes	Yes
1977	Jaisún	"You're All I Need To Get By"	Jaisún			Yes	Yes
1977	Jaisún	"Keepin' It To Myself"	Jaisún			Yes	Yes
1977	Jaisún	"Closet Man"	Jaisún	Yes		Yes	Yes
1977	Takao Kisugi	"Tsurenai Yuhgure"	Zigzag				Yes
1977	Takao Kisugi	"Amai Shokutaku"	Zigzag				Yes
1977	Takao Kisugi	"Yaketa Natsu"	Zigzag				Yes
1977	Takao Kisugi	"Zigzag"	Zigzag				Yes
1977	Takao Kisugi	"Naga Ame"	Zigzag				Yes
1977	Takao Kisugi	"Amai Taikutsu"	Zigzag				Yes
1977	Takao Kisugi	"Uraburete"	Zigzag				Yes
1977	Sonny and Cher	"You're Not Right For Me"	single only		Yes	Yes	Yes
1977	Cheech and Chong	"Bloat On"	single only			Yes	Yes
1977	Cheech and Chong	"Just Say "Right On" (The Bloaters' Creed)"	single only			Yes	Yes
1978	Alice Cooper	"From the Inside"	From The Inside	Yes	Yes	Yes	Yes
1978	Alice Cooper	"Wish I Were Born in Beverly Hills"	From The Inside		Yes	Yes	Yes
1978	Alice Cooper	"The Quiet Room"	From The Inside		Yes	Yes	Yes
1978	Alice Cooper	"Nurse Rozetta"	From The Inside	Yes	Yes	Yes	Yes
1978	Alice Cooper	"Millie and Billie"	From The Inside		Yes	Yes	Yes
1978	Alice Cooper	"Serious"	From The Inside	Yes	Yes	Yes	Yes
1978	Alice Cooper	"How You Gonna See Me Now"	From The Inside		Yes	Yes	Yes
1978	Alice Cooper	"For Veronica's Sake"	From The Inside		Yes	Yes	Yes
1978	Alice Cooper	"Jackknife Johnny"	From The Inside		Yes	Yes	Yes
1978	Alice Cooper	"Inmates (We’re All Crazy)"	From The Inside		Yes	Yes	Yes
1978	Daryl Hall & John Oates	"It's a Laugh"	Along The Red Ledge		Yes	Yes	Yes
1978	Daryl Hall & John Oates	"Melody for a Memory"	Along The Red Ledge		Yes	Yes	Yes
1978	Daryl Hall & John Oates	"The Last Time"	Along The Red Ledge		Yes	Yes	Yes
1978	Daryl Hall & John Oates	"I Don't Wanna Lose You"	Along The Red Ledge		Yes	Yes	Yes
1978	Daryl Hall & John Oates	"Have I Been Away Too Long"	Along The Red Ledge		Yes	Yes	Yes
1978	Daryl Hall & John Oates	"Alley Katz"	Along The Red Ledge		Yes	Yes	Yes
1978	Daryl Hall & John Oates	"Don't Blame It on Love"	Along The Red Ledge		Yes	Yes	Yes
1978	Daryl Hall & John Oates	"Serious Music"	Along The Red Ledge		Yes	Yes	Yes
1978	Daryl Hall & John Oates	"Pleasure Beach"	Along The Red Ledge		Yes	Yes	Yes
1978	Daryl Hall & John Oates	"August Day"	Along The Red Ledge		Yes	Yes	Yes
1978	Bill Champlin	"What Good Is Love"	Single		Yes	Yes	Yes
1978	Bill Champlin	"I Don't Want You Anymore"	Single	Yes	Yes	Yes	Yes
1978	Bill Champlin	"We Both Tried"	Single	Yes	Yes	Yes	Yes
1978	Bill Champlin	"Yo Mama"	Single		Yes	Yes	Yes
1978	Bill Champlin	"Fly With Me"	Single		Yes	Yes	Yes
1978	Bill Champlin	"Love Is Forever"	Single		Yes	Yes	Yes
1978	Bill Champlin	"Careless"	Single		Yes	Yes	Yes
1978	Bill Champlin	"Elayne"	Single		Yes	Yes	Yes
1978	Bill Champlin	"Keys To The Kingdom"	Single	Yes	Yes	Yes	Yes
1978	Barbra Streisand	"Love Breakdown"	Songbird				Yes
1978	Carole Bayer Sager	"It's the Falling in Love"	...Too	Yes		Yes	Yes
1978	Carole Bayer Sager	"You're Interesting"	...Too				Yes
1978	Carole Bayer Sager	"I Don't Wanna Dance No More"	...Too	Yes		Yes	Yes
1978	Paul Anka	"I'm By Myself Again"	Listen To Your Heart	Yes			
1978	Paul Anka	"Don't Ever Say Goodbye"	Listen To Your Heart	Yes			
1978	Nigel Olsson	"Rainy Day"	Nigel Olsson (second self-titled)				Yes
1978	Nigel Olsson	"You Know I'll Always Love You"	Nigel Olsson (second self-titled)	Yes			Yes
1978	Nigel Olsson	"Say Goodbye To Hollywood"	Nigel Olsson (second self-titled)				Yes
1978	Nigel Olsson	"Part Of The Chosen Few"	Nigel Olsson (second self-titled)				Yes
1978	Nigel Olsson	"Please Don't Tease"	Nigel Olsson (second self-titled)	Yes			Yes
1978	Nigel Olsson	"All It Takes"	Nigel Olsson (second self-titled)	Yes			Yes
1978	Nigel Olsson	"Living In A Fantasy"	Nigel Olsson (second self-titled)				Yes
1978	Nigel Olsson	"Right Or Wrong"	Nigel Olsson (second self-titled)	Yes			Yes
1978	Nigel Olsson	"Cassey Blue"	Nigel Olsson (second self-titled)	Yes			Yes
1978	Nigel Olsson	"Au Revoir"	Nigel Olsson (second self-titled)				Yes
1978	Bob Weir	"Bombs Away"	Heaven Help The Fool				Yes
1978	Bob Weir	"Easy to Slip"	Heaven Help The Fool				Yes
1978	Bob Weir	"Salt Lake City"	Heaven Help The Fool				Yes
1978	Bob Weir	"Shade of Grey"	Heaven Help The Fool				Yes
1978	Bob Weir	"Heaven Help the Fool"	Heaven Help The Fool				Yes
1978	Bob Weir	"This Time Forever"	Heaven Help The Fool				Yes
1978	Bob Weir	"I'll Be Doggone"	Heaven Help The Fool				Yes
1978	Bob Weir	"Wrong Way Feelin'"	Heaven Help The Fool				Yes
1978	Cory Wells	"Waiting For You"	Touch Me				Yes
1978	Cory Wells	"You're My Day"	Touch Me				Yes
1978	Cory Wells	"Everything's Right For Love"	Touch Me				Yes
1978	Cory Wells	"Midnight Lady (Hiding In The Shadows)"	Touch Me				Yes
1978	Cory Wells	"Starlight"	Touch Me				Yes
1978	Cory Wells	"Throw A Little Bit Of Love My Way"	Touch Me	Yes			Yes
1978	Cory Wells	"I Know You're Willin' Darlin'"	Touch Me				Yes
1978	Cory Wells	"Change Of Heart"	Touch Me				Yes
1978	Cory Wells	"Lady Put The Light Out"	Touch Me				Yes
1978	The Brothers Johnson	"So Won't You Stay"	Blam!	Yes			Yes
1978	The Brothers Johnson	"Blam!"	Blam!	Yes			Yes
1978	Lee Ritenour	"Morning Glory"	The Captain's Journey			Yes	Yes
1978	Lee Ritenour	"Matchmakers"	The Captain's Journey				Yes
1978	Cheryl Lynn	"Got to Be Real"	Cheryl Lynn	Yes			
1978	The McCrarys	"You"	Loving Is Living				Yes
1978	The McCrarys	"Thinking About You"	Loving Is Living				Yes
1978	The McCrarys	"Don't Wear Yourself Out"	Loving Is Living				Yes
1978	The McCrarys	"Loving Is Living"	Loving Is Living				Yes
1978	The McCrarys	"Here's That Feeling"	Loving Is Living				Yes
1978	The McCrarys	"You Are The Key"	Loving Is Living				Yes
1978	Hodges, James and Smith	"You Can't Hide Love"	What Have You Done For Love?			Yes	Yes
1978	Hodges, James and Smith	"Here Is Where Your Love Belongs"	What Have You Done For Love?			Yes	Yes
1978	Hodges, James and Smith	"Seems So Long"	What Have You Done For Love?			Yes	Yes
1978	Angelo	"Midnight Prowl"	Midnight Prowl				Yes
1978	Angelo	"Changing Man"	Midnight Prowl			Yes	Yes
1978	Angelo	"The Desert"	Midnight Prowl			Yes	Yes
1978	Angelo	"We're Over"	Midnight Prowl			Yes	Yes
1978	Angelo	"As I See You Now"	Midnight Prowl			Yes	Yes
1978	Reneé Armand	"Love On A Shoestring"	In Time				Yes
1978	Reneé Armand	"(We're) Dancing In The Dark"	In Time				Yes
1978	Reneé Armand	"House Up On THe Hill"	In Time				Yes
1978	Reneé Armand	"Indian Brown"	In Time				Yes
1978	Reneé Armand	"In Time"	In Time				Yes
1978	Reneé Armand	"Suite For 3 Poems (Living In The City / Signs / Ashes Like Us)"	In Time				Yes
1978	Reneé Armand	"High Wind Blowin'"	In Time				Yes
1978	Reneé Armand	"Beggarman"	In Time				Yes
1978	Reneé Armand	"The Bitter Taste Of Wild Things"	In Time				Yes
1978	Donna Summer	"Last Dance"	Thank God It's Friday: Original Soundtrack				Yes
1978	Olivia Newton-John	"Talk to Me"	Totally Hot				Yes
1978	Flora Purim	"Five-Four"	Everyday, Everynight				Yes
1978	The Manhattan Transfer	"Who, What, When, Where, Why"	Pastiche				Yes
1978	Mary MacGregor	"If You Ever Believed"	In Your Eyes				Yes
1978	Mary MacGregor	"Don't Let Me Be Lonely Tonight"	In Your Eyes				Yes
1978	Mary MacGregor	"Seashells On The Windows, Candles And A Magic Stone"	In Your Eyes				Yes
1978	Mary MacGregor	"I've Never Been To Me"	In Your Eyes				Yes
1978	Country Joe McDonald	"Coyote"	Rock And Roll Music From The Planet Earth				Yes
1978	Country Joe McDonald	"Rock And Roll Again"	Rock And Roll Music From The Planet Earth				Yes
1978	Country Joe McDonald	"Southern Cross"	Rock And Roll Music From The Planet Earth				Yes
1978	Country Joe McDonald	"Get It Together"	Rock And Roll Music From The Planet Earth				Yes
1978	Paul Jabara	"Didn't The Time Go Fast"	Keeping Time				Yes
1978	Paul Jabara	"Pleasure Island"	Keeping Time				Yes
1978	Paul Jabara	"Something's Missing (In My Life)"	Keeping Time				Yes
1978	Stephen Bishop	"Losing Myself in You"	Bish				Yes
1978	Stephen Bishop	"Looking for the Right One"	Bish				Yes
1978	Maxine Nightingale	"You Got To Me"	Love Lines				Yes
1978	Maxine Nightingale	"Lead Me On"	Love Lines				Yes
1978	Seals and Crofts	"Midnight Blue"	Takin' It Easy				Yes
1978	Steven Tetsch	"Face In The Crowd"	West Coast Confidential				Yes
1978	Steven Tetsch	"Blood And Sand"	West Coast Confidential				Yes
1979	Earth, Wind & Fire	"In the Stone"	I Am	Yes		Yes	Yes
1979	Earth, Wind & Fire	"After the Love Has Gone"	I Am	Yes		Yes	Yes
1979	Earth, Wind & Fire	"Let Your Feelings Show"	I Am	Yes			
1979	Earth, Wind & Fire	"Wait"	I Am	Yes			
1979	Earth, Wind & Fire	"Rock That!"	I Am	Yes		Yes	Yes
1979	Earth, Wind & Fire	"You and I"	I Am	Yes			
1979	Michael Jackson	"Girlfriend"	Off the Wall				Yes
1979	Michael Jackson	"It's the Falling in Love"	Off the Wall	Yes		Yes	Yes
1979	Barbra Streisand	"Splish Splash"	Wet			Yes	Yes
1979	Paul Anka	"Headlines"	Headlines			Yes	Yes
1979	Paul Anka	"Never Get To Know You"	Headlines	Yes		Yes	Yes
1979	Paul Anka	"Learning To Love Again"	Headlines	Yes		Yes	Yes
1979	Daryl Hall & John Oates	"The Woman Comes and Goes"	X-Static		Yes	Yes	Yes
1979	Daryl Hall & John Oates	"Wait for Me"	X-Static		Yes	Yes	Yes
1979	Daryl Hall & John Oates	"Portable Radio"	X-Static		Yes	Yes	Yes
1979	Daryl Hall & John Oates	"All You Want Is Heaven"	X-Static		Yes	Yes	Yes
1979	Daryl Hall & John Oates	"Who Said the World Was Fair"	X-Static		Yes	Yes	Yes
1979	Daryl Hall & John Oates	"Running from Paradise"	X-Static		Yes	Yes	Yes
1979	Daryl Hall & John Oates	"Number One"	X-Static		Yes	Yes	Yes
1979	Daryl Hall & John Oates	"Bebop/Drop"	X-Static		Yes	Yes	Yes
1979	Daryl Hall & John Oates	"Hallofon"	X-Static		Yes	Yes	Yes
1979	Daryl Hall & John Oates	"Intravino"	X-Static		Yes	Yes	Yes
1979	The Emotions	"What's the Name of Your Love"	Come Into Our World	Yes			Yes
1979	The Emotions	"On & On"	Come Into Our World	Yes			Yes
1979	The Emotions	"The Movie"	Come Into Our World	Yes			Yes
1979	Dolly Parton	"Star Of The Show"	Great Balls Of Fire				Yes
1979	Dolly Parton	"Almost In Love"	Great Balls Of Fire				Yes
1979	The Manhattan Transfer	"Nothin' You Can Do About It"	Extensions	Yes		Yes	Yes
1979	Debby Boone	"Meet Me on the Dance Floor"	Debby Boone			Yes	Yes
1979	Lee Ritenour	"Feel the Night"	Feel The Night				Yes
1979	Lee Ritenour	"Market Place"	Feel The Night				Yes
1979	Lee Ritenour	"Wicked Wine"	Feel The Night				Yes
1979	Lee Ritenour	"You Make Me Feel Like Dancing"	Feel The Night				Yes
1979	Harvey Mason	"I'd Still Be There"	Groovin' You				Yes
1979	Harvey Mason	"The Race"	Groovin' You				Yes
1979	Harvey Mason	"We Can"	Groovin' You			Yes	
1979	Harvey Mason	"Never Give You Up"	Groovin' You				Yes
1979	Harvey Mason	"Say It Again"	Groovin' You	Yes			
1979	Deniece Williams	"Are You Thinking?"	When Love Comes Calling		Yes	Yes	Yes
1979	Deniece Williams	"I've Got the Next Dance"	When Love Comes Calling		Yes	Yes	Yes
1979	Deniece Williams	"Touch Me Again"	When Love Comes Calling		Yes	Yes	Yes
1979	Deniece Williams	"When Love Comes Calling"	When Love Comes Calling	Yes	Yes	Yes	Yes
1979	Deniece Williams	"God Knows"	When Love Comes Calling		Yes	Yes	Yes
1979	Deniece Williams	"Why Can't We Fall in Love?"	When Love Comes Calling	Yes	Yes	Yes	Yes
1979	Nigel Olsson	"A Little Bit Of Soap"	Nigel			Yes	Yes
1979	Nigel Olsson	"You Know I'll Always Love You"	Nigel	Yes		Yes	Yes
1979	Nigel Olsson	"Dancin' Shoes"	Nigel			Yes	Yes
1979	Nigel Olsson	"Part Of The Chosen Few"	Nigel			Yes	Yes
1979	Nigel Olsson	"Say Goodbye To Hollywood"	Nigel			Yes	Yes
1979	Nigel Olsson	"All It Takes"	Nigel	Yes		Yes	Yes
1979	Nigel Olsson	"Thinking Of You"	Nigel			Yes	Yes
1979	Nigel Olsson	"Living In A Fantasy"	Nigel			Yes	Yes
1979	Nigel Olsson	"Cassey Blue / Au Revoir"	Nigel	Yes		Yes	Yes
1979	Cheryl Lynn	"In Love"	In Love				Yes
1979	The Keane Brothers	"Is Love Not Enough"	Taking Off		Yes	Yes	Yes
1979	The Keane Brothers	"One Thing On My Mind"	Taking Off	Yes	Yes	Yes	Yes
1979	Sandy Contella	"Don't Ever Say Goodbye"	Between Two Hearts	Yes			Yes
1979	Sandy Contella	"Strangers"	Between Two Hearts			Yes	Yes
1979	Sandy Contella	"You Bring Out The Best In Me"	Between Two Hearts				Yes
1979	Sandy Contella	You Know How To Hurt A Guy"	Between Two Hearts	Yes			Yes
1979	Sandy Contella	"Seasons"	Between Two Hearts				Yes
1979	Steve Kipner	"Knock The Walls Down"	Knock The Walls Down				Yes
1979	Steve Kipner	"Lovemaker"	Knock The Walls Down				Yes
1979	Steve Kipner	"School Of Broken Hearts"	Knock The Walls Down				Yes
1979	Steve Kipner	"Love Is Its Own Reward"	Knock The Walls Down				Yes
1979	Highway	"(If I) Breakdown"	Highway 1				Yes
1979	Ned Doheny	"To Prove My Love"	Prone				Yes
1979	Ned Doheny	"Thinking With My Heart"	Prone				Yes
1979	Ned Doheny	"Guess Who's Looking For Love Again"	Prone				Yes
1979	Ned Doheny	"The Devil In You"	Prone				Yes

80s

Year	Artist	Song	Album	Composer	Producer	Arranger	Keyboards
1980	Boz Scaggs	"Jojo"	Middle Man	Yes		Yes	Yes
1980	Boz Scaggs	"Breakdown Dead Ahead"	Middle Man	Yes		Yes	Yes
1980	Boz Scaggs	"Simone"	Middle Man	Yes		Yes	Yes
1980	Boz Scaggs	"You Can Have Me Anytime"	Middle Man	Yes			Yes
1980	Boz Scaggs	"Middle Man"	Middle Man	Yes		Yes	Yes
1980	Boz Scaggs	"Angel You"	Middle Man	Yes		Yes	Yes
1980	Boz Scaggs	"Isn't It Time"	Middle Man			Yes	Yes
1980	Boz Scaggs	"You Got Some Imagination"	Middle Man			Yes	Yes
1980	Boz Scaggs	"Look What You've Done to Me"	Urban Cowboy: Original Soundtrack	Yes	Yes	Yes	Yes
1980	Earth, Wind & Fire	"Let Me Talk"	Faces			Yes	Yes
1980	Earth, Wind & Fire	"You"	Faces	Yes		Yes	Yes
1980	Earth, Wind & Fire	"Song in My Heart"	Faces			Yes	Yes
1980	Earth, Wind & Fire	"And Love Goes On"	Faces	Yes		Yes	Yes
1980	Earth, Wind & Fire	"In Time"	Faces			Yes	Yes
1980	Earth, Wind & Fire	"Faces"	Faces			Yes	Yes
1980	Average White Band	"Our Time Has Come"	Shine		Yes	Yes	Yes
1980	Average White Band	"For You, For Love"	Shine		Yes	Yes	Yes
1980	Average White Band	"Let´s Go ´Round Again"	Shine		Yes	Yes	Yes
1980	Average White Band	"Whatcha' Gonna Do For Me"	Shine		Yes	Yes	Yes
1980	Average White Band	"Into The Night"	Shine		Yes	Yes	Yes
1980	Average White Band	"Catch Me (Before I Have To Testify)"	Shine	Yes	Yes	Yes	Yes
1980	Average White Band	"Help Is On The Way"	Shine	Yes	Yes	Yes	Yes
1980	Average White Band	"If Love Only Lasts For One Night"	Shine		Yes	Yes	Yes
1980	Average White Band	"Shine"	Shine		Yes	Yes	Yes
1980	Average White Band	"Into The Night (Reprise)"	Shine		Yes	Yes	Yes
1980	Average White Band	"Kiss Me"	Volume VIII		Yes	Yes	Yes
1980	Average White Band	"Love Won't Get In The Way"	Volume VIII		Yes	Yes	Yes
1980	Average White Band	"Love Gives, Love Takes Away"	Volume VIII		Yes	Yes	Yes
1980	Average White Band	"Growing Pains"	Volume VIII	Yes	Yes	Yes	Yes
1980	Peter Allen	"One Step Over the Borderline"	Bi-Coastal	Yes	Yes	Yes	Yes
1980	Peter Allen	"Fly Away"	Bi-Coastal	Yes	Yes	Yes	Yes
1980	Peter Allen	"Bi-Coastal"	Bi-Coastal	Yes	Yes	Yes	Yes
1980	Peter Allen	"I Don't Go Shopping"	Bi-Coastal		Yes	Yes	Yes
1980	Peter Allen	"Hit in the Heart"	Bi-Coastal	Yes	Yes	Yes	Yes
1980	Peter Allen	"I Could Really Show You Around"	Bi-Coastal		Yes	Yes	Yes
1980	Peter Allen	"Somebody's Angel"	Bi-Coastal		Yes	Yes	Yes
1980	Peter Allen	"Simon"	Bi-Coastal		Yes	Yes	Yes
1980	Peter Allen	"Pass this Time"	Bi-Coastal	Yes	Yes	Yes	Yes
1980	Peter Allen	"When this Love Affair is Over"	Bi-Coastal	Yes	Yes	Yes	Yes
1980	Aretha Franklin	"Come to Me"	Aretha				Yes
1980	Aretha Franklin	"What a Fool Believes"	Aretha				Yes
1980	Aretha Franklin	"I Can't Turn You Loose"	Aretha				Yes
1980	Elton John	"Give Me The Love"	21 At 33			Yes	
1980	George Benson	"Love X Love"	Give Me The Night			Yes	
1980	George Benson	"Midnight Love Affair"	Give Me The Night			Yes	
1980	Al Jarreau	"Gimme What You Got"	This Time				Yes
1980	Al Jarreau	"Love Is Real"	This Time				Yes
1980	Al Jarreau	"(A Rhyme) This Time"	This Time				Yes
1980	Tavares	"We Both Tried"	Supercharged	Yes	Yes	Yes	Yes
1980	Tavares	"Why Can't We Fall In Love"	Supercharged	Yes			
1980	Tavares	"I Don't Want You Anymore"	Supercharged	Yes	Yes	Yes	Yes
1980	Ray Kennedy	"It Never Crossed My Mind"	Ray Kennedy		Yes	Yes	Yes
1980	Ray Kennedy	"Isn't It Time?"	Ray Kennedy		Yes	Yes	Yes
1980	Ray Kennedy	"Just For The Moment"	Ray Kennedy		Yes	Yes	Yes
1980	Ray Kennedy	"Can't Seem To Find The Time"	Ray Kennedy		Yes	Yes	Yes
1980	Ray Kennedy	"My Everlasting Love"	Ray Kennedy	Yes	Yes	Yes	Yes
1980	Ray Kennedy	"You Oughta Know By Now"	Ray Kennedy	Yes	Yes	Yes	Yes
1980	Ray Kennedy	"Sail On Sailor"	Ray Kennedy		Yes	Yes	Yes
1980	Ray Kennedy	"Starlight"	Ray Kennedy		Yes	Yes	Yes
1980	Ray Kennedy	"Let Me Sing You A Love Letter"	Ray Kennedy		Yes	Yes	Yes
1980	Teri DeSario	"Caught"	Caught				Yes
1980	Teri DeSario	"Standin' On The Edge"	Caught				Yes
1980	Teri DeSario	"I've Got A Secret"	Caught				Yes
1980	Teri DeSario	"I Hate You"	Caught				Yes
1980	England Dan Seals	"Love Me Like the Last Time"	Stones				Yes
1980	England Dan Seals	"Holdin' Out For Love"	Stones				Yes
1980	Bruce Roberts	"S'Good Enuf"	Cool Fool				Yes
1980	Nielsen/Pearson	"Don't Let Me Go"	Nielsen/Pearson				Yes
1980	Nielsen/Pearson	"Love Me Tonight"	Nielsen/Pearson				Yes
1980	Nielsen/Pearson	"It Could Be Trouble"	Nielsen/Pearson				Yes
1980	Nielsen/Pearson	"Givin' Your Love To Me"	Nielsen/Pearson				Yes
1980	Heat	"It's Up To You"	Heat				Yes
1980	Heat	"This Love That We've Found"	Heat				Yes
1980	Heat	"Don't You Walk Away"	Heat				Yes
1980	Mariya Takeuchi	"Sweetest Music"	Miss M			Yes	Yes
1980	Mariya Takeuchi	"Every Night"	Miss M			Yes	Yes
1980	Mariya Takeuchi	"Morning Glory"	Miss M			Yes	Yes
1980	Mariya Takeuchi	"Secret Love"	Miss M	Yes		Yes	Yes
1980	Mariya Takeuchi	"Heart to Heart"	Miss M			Yes	Yes
1980	Ryo Okumoto	"Crystal Highway"	Makin' Rock			Yes	Yes
1980	Ryo Okumoto	"L.A. Express"	Makin' Rock				Yes
1980	Ryo Okumoto	"Original View Plus"	Makin' Rock			Yes	Yes
1980	Mel Carter	"I Don't Want To Get Over You"	single only			Yes	Yes
1980	Mel Carter	"You Changed My Life Again"	single only	Yes		Yes	Yes
1980	Black Rose	"Never Should've Started"	Black Rose	Yes			
1981	Quincy Jones	"Just Once"	The Dude				Yes
1981	Aretha Franklin	"Love All the Hurt Away"	Love All The Hurt Away				Yes
1981	Aretha Franklin	"Living in the Streets"	Love All The Hurt Away				Yes
1981	The Tubes	"Talk to Ya Later"	The Completion Backward Principle	Yes	Yes	Yes	
1981	The Tubes	"Sushi Girl"	The Completion Backward Principle		Yes	Yes	
1981	The Tubes	"Amnesia"	The Completion Backward Principle	Yes	Yes	Yes	
1981	The Tubes	"Mr. Hate"	The Completion Backward Principle		Yes	Yes	
1981	The Tubes	"Attack of the 50 Foot Woman"	The Completion Backward Principle		Yes	Yes	
1981	The Tubes	"Think About Me"	The Completion Backward Principle		Yes	Yes	
1981	The Tubes	"A Matter of Pride"	The Completion Backward Principle		Yes	Yes	
1981	The Tubes	"Don't Want to Wait Anymore"	The Completion Backward Principle	Yes	Yes	Yes	
1981	The Tubes	"Power Tools"	The Completion Backward Principle		Yes	Yes	
1981	The Tubes	"Let's Make Some Noise"	The Completion Backward Principle	Yes	Yes	Yes	
1981	The Manhattan Transfer	"The Boy from New York City"	Mecca for Moderns				Yes
1981	The Manhattan Transfer	"Spies in the Night"	Mecca for Moderns	Yes			Yes
1981	The Manhattan Transfer	"Smile Again"	Mecca for Moderns	Yes		Yes	Yes
1981	Lee Ritenour	"Mr. Briefcase"	Rit		Yes		Yes
1981	Lee Ritenour	"(Just) Tell Me Pretty Lies"	Rit				Yes
1981	Lee Ritenour	"No Sympathy"	Rit		Yes	Yes	Yes
1981	Lee Ritenour	"Is It You?"	Rit				Yes
1981	Lee Ritenour	"Good Question"	Rit		Yes		Yes
1981	The Pointer Sisters	"We're Gonna Make It"	Black & White	Yes		Yes	Yes
1981	Bill Champlin	"Runaway"	Runaway		Yes	Yes	Yes
1981	Bill Champlin	"One Way Ticket"	Runaway		Yes	Yes	Yes
1981	Bill Champlin	"Sara"	Runaway		Yes	Yes	Yes
1981	Bill Champlin	"Tonight Tonight"	Runaway	Yes	Yes	Yes	Yes
1981	Bill Champlin	"Runaway Reprise"	Runaway	Yes	Yes	Yes	Yes
1981	Bill Champlin	"Take It Uptown"	Runaway		Yes	Yes	Yes
1981	Bill Champlin	"Satisfaction"	Runaway		Yes	Yes	Yes
1981	Bill Champlin	"Stop Knockin' on My Door"	Runaway		Yes	Yes	Yes
1981	Bill Champlin	"Gotta Get Back to Love"	Runaway		Yes	Yes	Yes
1981	Bill Champlin	"Without You"	Runaway		Yes	Yes	Yes
1981	Bill Champlin	"The Fool Is All Alone"	Runaway		Yes	Yes	Yes
1981	Chaka Khan	"And the Melody Still Lingers On (Night in Tunisia)"	What Cha' Gonna Do For Me				Yes
1981	Carole Bayer Sager	"Tell Her"	Sometimes Late At Night			Yes	Yes
1981	Carole Bayer Sager	"Easy To Love Again"	Sometimes Late At Night			Yes	Yes
1981	Carole Bayer Sager	"Stronger Than Before"	Sometimes Late At Night			Yes	Yes
1981	Al Jarreau	"My Old Friend"	Breakin' Away				Yes
1981	Al Jarreau	"Our Love"	Breakin' Away			Yes	Yes
1981	Al Jarreau	"Breakin' Away"	Breakin' Away				Yes
1981	Earth, Wind & Fire	"Evolution Orange"	Raise!	Yes		Yes	Yes
1981	Herb Alpert	"I Get It From You"	Magic Man				Yes
1981	Patti Austin	"Do You Love Me"	Every Home Should Have One				Yes
1981	Patti Austin	"Baby, Come to Me"	Every Home Should Have One				Yes
1981	Patti Austin	"The Genie"	Every Home Should Have One				Yes
1981	Glen Campbell	"Any Which Way You Can"	It's The World Gone Crazy				Yes
1981	Little Feat	"China White"	Hoy-Hoy!				Yes
1981	Bobby King	"A Fool And His Love"	Bobby King				Yes
1981	Bobby King	"If You Don't Wan't My Love"	Bobby King				Yes
1981	Dwayne Ford	"Lovin' And Losin' You"	Needless Freaking		Yes	Yes	Yes
1981	Dwayne Ford	"Am I Ever Gonna Find Your Love"	Needless Freaking		Yes	Yes	Yes
1981	Dwayne Ford	"Stranger In Paradise"	Needless Freaking		Yes	Yes	Yes
1981	Dwayne Ford	"The Hurricane"	Needless Freaking		Yes	Yes	Yes
1981	Dwayne Ford	"Midnight Ride"	Needless Freaking		Yes	Yes	Yes
1981	Dwayne Ford	"The Best Will Survive"	Needless Freaking		Yes	Yes	Yes
1981	Sneaker	"Jaymes"	Sneaker				Yes
1981	Engelbert Humperdinck	"Don't You Love Me Anymore?"	Don't You Love Me Anymore?				Yes
1981	Engelbert Humperdinck	"Heart Don't Fail Me Now"	Don't You Love Me Anymore?				Yes
1982	Chicago	"What You're Missing"	Chicago 16		Yes	Yes	Yes
1982	Chicago	"Waiting for You to Decide"	Chicago 16	Yes	Yes	Yes	Yes
1982	Chicago	"Bad Advice"	Chicago 16	Yes	Yes	Yes	Yes
1982	Chicago	"Chains"	Chicago 16		Yes	Yes	Yes
1982	Chicago	"Hard to Say I'm Sorry" / "Get Away"	Chicago 16	Yes	Yes	Yes	Yes
1982	Chicago	"Follow Me"	Chicago 16	Yes	Yes	Yes	Yes
1982	Chicago	"Sonny Think Twice"	Chicago 16		Yes	Yes	Yes
1982	Chicago	"What Can I Say"	Chicago 16	Yes	Yes	Yes	Yes
1982	Chicago	"Rescue You"	Chicago 16	Yes	Yes	Yes	Yes
1982	Chicago	"Love Me Tomorrow"	Chicago 16	Yes	Yes	Yes	Yes
1982	Michael Jackson	"The Girl Is Mine"	Thriller			Yes	Yes
1982	Neil Diamond	"Heartlight"	Heartlight				Yes
1982	Neil Diamond	"I'm Alive"	Heartlight	Yes	Yes	Yes	Yes
1982	Neil Diamond	"I'm Guilty"	Heartlight				Yes
1982	Dionne Warwick	"For You"	Friends In Love				Yes
1982	Dionne Warwick	"Can't Hide Love"	Friends In Love				Yes
1982	Dionne Warwick	"A Love So Right"	Friends In Love				Yes
1982	Dionne Warwick and Johnny Mathis	"Friends in Love"	Friends In Love	Yes			Yes
1982	Dionne Warwick and Johnny Mathis	"Got You Where I Want You"	Friends In Love				Yes
1982	Donna Summer	"Livin' in America"	Donna Summer	Yes		Yes	Yes
1982	Donna Summer	"Love Is Just A Breath Away"	Donna Summer	Yes		Yes	Yes
1982	Kenny Loggins	"Heart to Heart"	High Adventure	Yes		Yes	Yes
1982	Kenny Loggins	"If It's Not What You're Looking For"	High Adventure	Yes			
1982	Herbie Hancock	"Paradise"	Lite Me Up	Yes			Yes
1982	Leon Ware	"Slippin' Away"	Leon Ware			Yes	Yes
1982	Jimmy Webb	"God's Gift"	Angel Heart				Yes
1982	Jimmy Webb	"His World"	Angel Heart				Yes
1982	Jimmy Webb	"Nasty Love"	Angel Heart				Yes
1982	Anne Bertucci	"Substitution"	I'm Number One				Yes
1982	Anne Bertucci	"Room No.3"	I'm Number One				Yes
1982	Anne Bertucci	"So Selfish"	I'm Number One				Yes
1982	Anne Bertucci	"No No No"	I'm Number One				Yes
1982	Anne Bertucci	"Don'tcha Dare Love Me"	I'm Number One				Yes
1982	Lee Ritenour	"Voices"	Rit/2			Yes	Yes
1982	Harvey Mason	"Someday We'll All Be Free"	Stone Mason				Yes
1982	David Roberts	"Anywhere You Run To"	All Dressed Up				Yes
1983	Olivia Newton-John	"Twist of Fate"	Two of a Kind: Original Soundtrack		Yes	Yes	Yes
1983	Olivia Newton-John	"Take a Chance"	Two of a Kind: Original Soundtrack	Yes	Yes	Yes	Yes
1983	Olivia Newton-John	"Shaking You"	Two of a Kind: Original Soundtrack	Yes	Yes	Yes	Yes
1983	Olivia Newton-John	"Livin' in Desperate Times"	Two of a Kind: Original Soundtrack		Yes	Yes	Yes
1983	Steve Kipner	"Catch 22 (2 Steps Forward, 3 Steps Back)"	Two of a Kind: Original Soundtrack				Yes
1983	Boz Scaggs	"The Perfect One"	Two of a Kind: Original Soundtrack	Yes	Yes	Yes	Yes
1983	Chicago	"Prima Donna"	Two of a Kind: Original Soundtrack		Yes	Yes	Yes
1983	David Foster	"Night Music"	Two of a Kind: Original Soundtrack	Yes	Yes	Yes	Yes
1983	Kenny Rogers	"We've Got Tonight"	We've Got Tonight		Yes	Yes	Yes
1983	Kenny Rogers	"All My Life"	We've Got Tonight		Yes	Yes	Yes
1983	James Ingram	"Whatever We Imagine"	It's Your Night	Yes		Yes	Yes
1983	James Ingram	"How Do You Keep the Music Playing?"	It's Your Night			Yes	Yes
1983	Lionel Richie	"The Only One"	Can't Slow Down	Yes	Yes	Yes	Yes
1983	Paul Anka	"Second Chance"	Walk a Fine Line	Yes		Yes	Yes
1983	Paul Anka	"Hold Me 'Til The Mornin' Comes"	Walk a Fine Line	Yes		Yes	Yes
1983	Paul Anka	"Darlin', Darlin'"	Walk a Fine Line	Yes		Yes	Yes
1983	Paul Anka	"Take Me In Your Arms"	Walk a Fine Line	Yes		Yes	Yes
1983	Paul Anka	"This Is The First Time"	Walk a Fine Line			Yes	Yes
1983	Paul Anka	"Gimme The Word"	Walk a Fine Line	Yes		Yes	Yes
1983	Paul Anka	"Golden Boy"	Walk a Fine Line			Yes	Yes
1983	Brenda Russell	"It's Something"	Two Eyes	Yes		Yes	Yes
1983	Al Jarreau	"Mornin'"	Jarreau	Yes		Yes	Yes
1983	Al Jarreau	"Save Me"	Jarreau	Yes		Yes	Yes
1983	Sheena Easton	"Almost Over You"	Best Kept Secret				Yes
1983	Stevie Nicks	"Nightbird"	The Wild Heart				Yes
1983	Jennifer Holliday	"I Am Love"	Feel My Soul	Yes		Yes	Yes
1983	The Tubes	"She's a Beauty"	Outside Inside	Yes	Yes	Yes	Yes
1983	The Tubes	"No Not Again"	Outside Inside		Yes	Yes	Yes
1983	The Tubes	"Out of the Business"	Outside Inside		Yes	Yes	Yes
1983	The Tubes	"The Monkey Time"	Outside Inside		Yes	Yes	Yes
1983	The Tubes	"Glass House"	Outside Inside		Yes	Yes	Yes
1983	The Tubes	"Wild Women of Wongo"	Outside Inside		Yes	Yes	Yes
1983	The Tubes	"Tip of My Tongue"	Outside Inside		Yes	Yes	Yes
1983	The Tubes	"Fantastic Delusion"	Outside Inside		Yes	Yes	Yes
1983	The Tubes	"Drums"	Outside Inside		Yes	Yes	Yes
1983	The Tubes	"Theme Park"	Outside Inside		Yes	Yes	Yes
1983	The Tubes	"Outside Lookin' Inside"	Outside Inside		Yes	Yes	Yes
1983	Peter Allen	"Just Another Make-Out Song"	Not The Boy Next Door	Yes			Yes
1983	Peter Allen	"Not the Boy Next Door"	Not The Boy Next Door				Yes
1983	Peter Allen	"You and Me"	Not The Boy Next Door				Yes
1983	Peter Allen	"Once Before I Go"	Not The Boy Next Door				Yes
1983	Earth, Wind & Fire	"Could It Be Right"	Electric Universe	Yes			Yes
1983	Earth, Wind & Fire	"Spirit Of A New World"	Electric Universe	Yes			
1983	Barry Manilow	"Put a Quarter in the Jukebox"	Greatest Hits Vol. II				Yes
1983	Country Joe McDonald	"Power Plant Blues"	Childs Play				Yes
1983	Juice Newton	"Til I Loved You"	Dirty Looks				Yes
1983	Ney Matogrosso	"10 Anos (Pout Pourri)"	...Pois É				Yes
1983	Ney Matogrosso	"Ate O Fim"	...Pois É				Yes
1984	Chicago	"Stay the Night"	Chicago 17	Yes	Yes	Yes	Yes
1984	Chicago	"We Can Stop the Hurtin'"	Chicago 17		Yes	Yes	Yes
1984	Chicago	"Hard Habit to Break"	Chicago 17		Yes	Yes	Yes
1984	Chicago	"Only You"	Chicago 17	Yes	Yes	Yes	Yes
1984	Chicago	"Remember the Feeling"	Chicago 17		Yes	Yes	Yes
1984	Chicago	"Along Comes a Woman"	Chicago 17		Yes	Yes	Yes
1984	Chicago	"You're the Inspiration"	Chicago 17	Yes	Yes	Yes	Yes
1984	Chicago	"Please Hold On"	Chicago 17	Yes	Yes	Yes	Yes
1984	Chicago	"Once in a Lifetime"	Chicago 17		Yes	Yes	Yes
1984	Kenny Rogers	"What About Me?"	What About Me?	Yes	Yes	Yes	Yes
1984	Kenny Rogers	"The Night Goes On"	What About Me?		Yes	Yes	Yes
1984	Kenny Rogers	"Somebody Took My Love"	What About Me?		Yes	Yes	Yes
1984	Kenny Rogers	"Crazy"	What About Me?		Yes	Yes	Yes
1984	Fee Waybill	"You're Still Laughing"	Read My Lips	Yes	Yes	Yes	Yes
1984	Fee Waybill	"Nobody's Perfect"	Read My Lips	Yes	Yes	Yes	Yes
1984	Fee Waybill	"Who Loves You Baby"	Read My Lips	Yes	Yes	Yes	Yes
1984	Fee Waybill	"I Don't Even Know Your Name (Passion Play)"	Read My Lips	Yes	Yes	Yes	Yes
1984	Fee Waybill	"Who Said Life Would Be Pretty"	Read My Lips	Yes	Yes	Yes	Yes
1984	Fee Waybill	"Thrill Of The Kill"	Read My Lips		Yes	Yes	Yes
1984	Fee Waybill	"Saved My Life"	Read My Lips	Yes	Yes	Yes	Yes
1984	Fee Waybill	"Caribbean Sunsets"	Read My Lips	Yes	Yes	Yes	Yes
1984	Fee Waybill	"Star Of The Show"	Read My Lips	Yes	Yes	Yes	Yes
1984	Fee Waybill	"I Could've Been Somebody"	Read My Lips	Yes	Yes	Yes	Yes
1984	Chaka Khan	"Through the Fire"	I Feel For You	Yes	Yes	Yes	Yes
1984	Kenny Loggins	"I'm Free (Heaven Helps The Man)"	Footloose: Original Soundtrack		Yes	Yes	Yes
1984	Neil Diamond	"Sleep With Me Tonight"	Primitive			Yes	Yes
1984	Neil Diamond	"Crazy"	Primitive			Yes	Yes
1984	Al Jarreau	"After All"	High Crime	Yes		Yes	Yes
1984	Air Supply	"I Can Wait Forever"	Ghostbusters: Original Soundtrack	Yes	Yes	Yes	Yes
1984	Naoko Kawai	"If You Want Me"	Daydream Coast			Yes	Yes
1984	Naoko Kawai	"Second Nature"	Daydream Coast			Yes	Yes
1984	Naoko Kawai	"I Love It"	Daydream Coast				Yes
1984	Naoko Kawai	"As Long As We're Dreaming"	Daydream Coast				Yes
1984	Naoko Kawai and David Foster	"Live Inside Your Love"	Daydream Coast				Yes
1984	Randy Newman	"The Natural"	The Natural: Original Soundtrack		Yes		
1984	Jack Wagner	"Lady of My Heart"	All I Need	Yes			
1985	John Parr	"St. Elmo's Fire (Man In Motion)"	St.Elmo's Fire: Original Soundtrack	Yes	Yes	Yes	Yes
1985	Billy Squier	"Shake Down"	St.Elmo's Fire: Original Soundtrack		Yes	Yes	Yes
1985	Elefante	"Young And Innocent"	St.Elmo's Fire: Original Soundtrack		Yes	Yes	Yes
1985	Jon Anderson	"This Time It Was Really Right"	St.Elmo's Fire: Original Soundtrack	Yes	Yes	Yes	Yes
1985	Fee Waybill	"Saved My Life"	St.Elmo's Fire: Original Soundtrack	Yes	Yes	Yes	Yes
1985	Vikki Moss	"If I Turn You Away"	St.Elmo's Fire: Original Soundtrack	Yes	Yes	Yes	Yes
1985	David Foster	"Love Theme From St. Elmo's Fire (Instrumental)"	St.Elmo's Fire: Original Soundtrack	Yes	Yes	Yes	Yes
1985	David Foster	"Georgetown"	St.Elmo's Fire: Original Soundtrack	Yes	Yes	Yes	Yes
1985	David Foster	"Love Theme From St. Elmo's Fire (For Just A Moment)"	St.Elmo's Fire: Original Soundtrack	Yes	Yes	Yes	Yes
1985	David Foster (as Airplay)	"Stressed Out (Close To The Edge)"	St.Elmo's Fire: Original Soundtrack	Yes	Yes	Yes	Yes
1985	Barbra Streisand	"Somewhere"	The Broadway Album		Yes	Yes	Yes
1985	Northern Lights	"Tears Are Not Enough"	We Are the World	Yes	Yes	Yes	Yes
1985	Chicago	"Good For Nothing"	We Are the World	Yes	Yes	Yes	Yes
1985	Dionne Warwick and Elton John, Gladys Knight, Stevie Wonder	"That's What Friends Are For"	Friends				Yes
1985	Dionne Warwick	"Love at Second Sight"	Friends	Yes	Yes	Yes	Yes
1985	Kenny Rogers	"The Best of Me"	The Heart of the Matter	Yes		Yes	Yes
1985	Kenny Loggins	"I'll Be There"	Vox Humana	Yes		Yes	Yes
1985	Kenny Loggins	"Forever"	Vox Humana	Yes	Yes	Yes	Yes
1985	Kenny Loggins	"At Last"	Vox Humana	Yes		Yes	Yes
1985	Kenny Loggins	"Loraine"	Vox Humana	Yes		Yes	Yes
1985	DeBarge	"Who's Holding Donna Now"	Rhythm of the Night	Yes		Yes	Yes
1985	Hermanos	"Cantaré, Cantarás (I Will Sing, You Will Sing)"	single only				Yes
1985	Jack Wagner	"Too Young"	Lighting Up The Night	Yes		Yes	Yes
1985	Paul Hyde And The Payolas	"Stuck In The Rain"	Here's The World For Ya		Yes	Yes	Yes
1985	Paul Hyde And The Payolas	"You're The Only Love"	Here's The World For Ya	Yes	Yes	Yes	Yes
1985	Paul Hyde And The Payolas	"It Won't Be You"	Here's The World For Ya	Yes	Yes	Yes	Yes
1985	Paul Hyde And The Payolas	"Cruel Hearted Lovers"	Here's The World For Ya		Yes	Yes	Yes
1985	Paul Hyde And The Payolas	"It Must Be Love"	Here's The World For Ya		Yes	Yes	Yes
1985	Paul Hyde And The Payolas	"Little Boys"	Here's The World For Ya		Yes	Yes	Yes
1985	Paul Hyde And The Payolas	"All That I Want"	Here's The World For Ya		Yes	Yes	Yes
1985	Paul Hyde And The Payolas	"Here's The World"	Here's The World For Ya	Yes	Yes	Yes	Yes
1985	Paul Hyde And The Payolas	"Rhythm Slaves"	Here's The World For Ya		Yes	Yes	Yes
1985	Paul Hyde And The Payolas	"Never Leave This Place"	Here's The World For Ya		Yes	Yes	Yes
1985	Bill Withers	"Oh Yeah!"	Watching You, Watching Me	Yes		Yes	Yes
1985	Naoko Kawai and Steve Lukather	"Finding Each Other"	9 1/2	Yes	Yes	Yes	Yes
1986	Chicago	"Niagara Falls"	Chicago 18		Yes	Yes	Yes
1986	Chicago	"Forever"	Chicago 18		Yes	Yes	Yes
1986	Chicago	"If She Would Have Been Faithful..."	Chicago 18		Yes	Yes	Yes
1986	Chicago	"25 or 6 to 4"	Chicago 18		Yes	Yes	Yes
1986	Chicago	"Will You Still Love Me?"	Chicago 18	Yes	Yes	Yes	Yes
1986	Chicago	"Over and Over"	Chicago 18		Yes	Yes	Yes
1986	Chicago	"It's Alright"	Chicago 18	Yes	Yes	Yes	Yes
1986	Chicago	"Free Flight"	Chicago 18		Yes	Yes	Yes
1986	Chicago	"Nothin's Gonna Stop Us Now"	Chicago 18		Yes	Yes	Yes
1986	Chicago	"I Believe"	Chicago 18		Yes	Yes	Yes
1986	Chicago	"One More Day"	Chicago 18		Yes	Yes	Yes
1986	Peter Cetera	"Glory of Love"	Solitude/Solitaire	Yes			
1986	Neil Diamond	"The Man You Need"	Headed For The Future	Yes	Yes	Yes	Yes
1986	Neil Diamond	"It Should Have Been Me"	Headed For The Future		Yes	Yes	Yes
1986	Neil Diamond	"Me Beside You"	Headed For The Future				Yes
1986	Anne Murray	"Now and Forever (You and Me)"	Something To Talk About	Yes	Yes	Yes	Yes
1986	Gordon Lightfoot	"Anything for Love"	East Of Midnight	Yes	Yes	Yes	Yes
1986	Lou Rawls	"Stop Me From Starting This Feeling"	Love All Your Blues Away	Yes	Yes	Yes	Yes
1986	Lou Rawls	"Learn To Love Again"	Love All Your Blues Away	Yes		Yes	Yes
1986	Patti LaBelle	"On My Own"	Winner In You				Yes
1986	Patti LaBelle	"Sleep With Me Tonight"	Winner In You				Yes
1986	El DeBarge	"When Love Has Gone Away"	El DeBarge				Yes
1986	El DeBarge	"Love Always"	El DeBarge				Yes
1986	Lee Ritenour	"If I'm Dreamin' (Don't Wake Me)"	Earth Run			Yes	Yes
1986	Jermaine Jackson	"Lonely Won't Leave Me Alone"	Precious Moments	Yes			
1986	Glenn Jones	"Love Will Show Us How"	Take It From Me	Yes			
1986	Janice Regan	"Tough Luck"	single only	Yes			
1987	Night Ranger	"The Secret Of My Success"	The Secret Of My Success: Original Soundtrack	Yes	Yes	Yes	Yes
1987	Danny Peck And Nancy Shanks	"I Burn For You"	The Secret Of My Success: Original Soundtrack	Yes	Yes	Yes	Yes
1987	Roger Daltrey	"The Price Of Love"	The Secret Of My Success: Original Soundtrack	Yes	Yes	Yes	Yes
1987	Restless Heart	"Don't Ask The Reason Why"	The Secret Of My Success: Original Soundtrack	Yes	Yes	Yes	Yes
1987	David Foster	"Gazebo"	The Secret Of My Success: Original Soundtrack	Yes	Yes	Yes	Yes
1987	David Foster	"Water Fountain"	The Secret Of My Success: Original Soundtrack	Yes	Yes	Yes	Yes
1987	David Foster	"3 Themes"	The Secret Of My Success: Original Soundtrack	Yes	Yes	Yes	Yes
1987	Dionne Warwick and Jeffrey Osborne	"Love Power"	Reservations For Two				Yes
1987	Gladys Knight & The Pips	"Love Is Fire (Love Is Ice)"	All Our Love				Yes
1987	Gladys Knight & The Pips	"Overnight Success"	All Our Love				Yes
1987	Siedah Garrett	"Everchanging Times"	Baby Boom: Original Soundtrack (unreleased)		Yes	Yes	Yes
1987	Tim Feehan	"Read Between The Lines"	Tim Feehan		Yes		
1987	Pauli Carman and Karyn White	"We Never Called It Love"	It's Time	Yes			
1988	Marilyn Martin and David Foster	"And When She Danced (Love Theme From Stealing Home)"	Stealing Home: Original Soundtrack	Yes	Yes	Yes	Yes
1988	The Nylons	"Poison Ivy"	Stealing Home: Original Soundtrack		Yes	Yes	Yes
1988	David Foster	"Stealing Home"	Stealing Home: Original Soundtrack	Yes	Yes	Yes	Yes
1988	David Foster	"Home Movies"	Stealing Home: Original Soundtrack	Yes	Yes	Yes	Yes
1988	David Foster	"Stealing Home (Reprise)"	Stealing Home: Original Soundtrack	Yes	Yes	Yes	Yes
1988	David Foster	"Katie's Theme"	Stealing Home: Original Soundtrack	Yes	Yes	Yes	Yes
1988	Neil Diamond	"The Best Years of Our Lives"	The Best Years Of Our Lives		Yes	Yes	Yes
1988	Neil Diamond	"Hard Times for Lovers"	The Best Years Of Our Lives		Yes	Yes	Yes
1988	Neil Diamond	"This Time"	The Best Years Of Our Lives	Yes	Yes	Yes	Yes
1988	Neil Diamond	"Everything's Gonna Be Fine"	The Best Years Of Our Lives		Yes	Yes	Yes
1988	Neil Diamond	"Hooked on the Memory of You"	The Best Years Of Our Lives		Yes	Yes	Yes
1988	Neil Diamond	"Take Care of Me"	The Best Years Of Our Lives	Yes	Yes	Yes	Yes
1988	Neil Diamond	"Baby Can I Hold You"	The Best Years Of Our Lives		Yes	Yes	Yes
1988	Neil Diamond	"Carmelita's Eyes"	The Best Years Of Our Lives	Yes	Yes	Yes	Yes
1988	Neil Diamond	"Courtin' Disaster"	The Best Years Of Our Lives	Yes	Yes	Yes	Yes
1988	Neil Diamond	"If I Couldn't See You Again"	The Best Years Of Our Lives		Yes	Yes	Yes
1988	Neil Diamond	"Long Hard Climb"	The Best Years Of Our Lives		Yes	Yes	Yes
1988	Seiko Matsuda	"Blue"	Citron	Yes	Yes	Yes	Yes
1988	Seiko Matsuda	"Marrakech"	Citron		Yes	Yes	Yes
1988	Seiko Matsuda	"Every Little Hurt"	Citron	Yes	Yes	Yes	Yes
1988	Seiko Matsuda	"You Can't Find Me"	Citron	Yes	Yes	Yes	Yes
1988	Seiko Matsuda	"Daite..."	Citron	Yes	Yes	Yes	Yes
1988	Seiko Matsuda	"We Never Get To It"	Citron	Yes	Yes	Yes	Yes
1988	Seiko Matsuda	"Zoku Akai Sweet Pea"	Citron	Yes	Yes	Yes	Yes
1988	Seiko Matsuda	"No.1"	Citron	Yes	Yes	Yes	Yes
1988	Seiko Matsuda	"Shigatu Ha Kaze No Tabibito"	Citron	Yes	Yes	Yes	Yes
1988	Seiko Matsuda	"Ringosyu No Hibi"	Citron	Yes	Yes	Yes	Yes
1988	Art Garfunkel	"This Is the Moment"	Lefty	Yes			Yes
1988	Art Garfunkel	"So Much in Love"	Lefty				Yes
1988	Julio Iglesias	"Love Is on Our Side Again"	Non Stop				Yes
1988	Julio Iglesias	"My Love"	Non Stop				Yes
1988	Santa Fé	"Cancion Sentimental"	El Camino	Yes		Yes	Yes
1988	George Hawkins Jr.	"No Tomorrow"	Fresh Horses: Original Soundtrack (unreleased)	Yes	Yes	Yes	Yes
1988	Mari Hamada	"Sailing On"	Love Never Turns Against			Yes	Yes
1989	David Foster	"Carol Of The Bells"	A David Foster Christmas Card (VHS)		Yes	Yes	Yes
1989	Natalie Cole	"Christmas Medley"	A David Foster Christmas Card (VHS)		Yes	Yes	Yes
1989	Kenny Loggins	"On Christmas Morning"	A David Foster Christmas Card (VHS)	Yes	Yes	Yes	Yes
1989	Kenny Loggins	"Rudolph The Red Nosed Reindeer"	A David Foster Christmas Card (VHS)		Yes		
1989	Kenny Loggins	"Santa Claus Is Coming To Town"	A David Foster Christmas Card (VHS)		Yes		
1989	Kenny Loggins	"Celebrate Me Home"	A David Foster Christmas Card (VHS)		Yes		
1989	Natalie Cole	"Grown Up Christmas List"	A David Foster Christmas Card (VHS)	Yes	Yes	Yes	Yes
1989	Natalie Cole	"Christmas Cometh A Carolling"	A David Foster Christmas Card (VHS)		Yes	Yes	
1989	David Foster	"The Joy Of Christmas Past"	A David Foster Christmas Card (VHS)	Yes	Yes	Yes	Yes
1989	David Foster and His Family	"Why Can't Christmas Last Longer Than A Day (Theme Song)"	A David Foster Christmas Card (VHS)	Yes	Yes	Yes	Yes
1989	Paul McCartney	"We Got Married"	Flowers In The Dirt		Yes		Yes
1989	Paul Anka	"Stay With Me"	Somebody Loves You		Yes	Yes	Yes
1989	Aretha Franklin	"Come To Me"	Through The Storm				Yes
1989	June Pointer	"How Long (Don't Make Me Wait)"	June Pointer	Yes	Yes	Yes	Yes
1989	Larry Carlton	"On Solid Ground"	On Solid Ground				Yes
1989	Celine Dion and Warren Wiebe	"Listen To Me"	Listen To Me: Original Soundtrack (unreleased)	Yes	Yes	Yes	Yes
1989	Christopher Max	"I Burn For You"	More Than Physical	Yes			

90s

Year	Artist	Song	Album	Composer	Producer	Arranger	Keyboards
1990	Celine Dion	"Love By Another Name"	Unison	Yes	Yes	Yes	Yes
1990	Celine Dion	"I'm Loving Every Moment With You"	Unison		Yes		Yes
1990	Celine Dion	"I Feel Too Much"	Unison		Yes		Yes
1990	Celine Dion	"If We Could Start Over"	Unison		Yes	Yes	Yes
1990	Celine Dion	"Have a Heart"	Unison		Yes	Yes	Yes
1990	Peter Cetera	"No Explanation"	Pretty Woman: Original Soundtrack	Yes	Yes	Yes	Yes
1990	Mary Lu Zahalan	"Letting Go"	Zahalan		Yes	Yes	Yes
1990	Myriam Hernández	"Sabía"	Dos				Yes
1990	Gilbert O'Sullivan	"At The Very Mention Of Your Name" (new arranging)	single only (US) / The Very Best Of Gilbert O'Sullivan (2012)		Yes	Yes	Yes
1991	Various Artists	"Voices That Care"	Voices That Care	Yes	Yes	Yes	Yes
1991	Natalie Cole	"Mona Lisa"	Unforgettable... with Love		Yes		
1991	Natalie Cole	"Lush Life"	Unforgettable... with Love		Yes		
1991	Natalie Cole	"That Sunday That Summer"	Unforgettable... with Love		Yes		
1991	Natalie Cole	"Avalon"	Unforgettable... with Love		Yes		
1991	Natalie Cole	"Too Young"	Unforgettable... with Love		Yes		
1991	Natalie Cole	"Almost Like Being in Love"	Unforgettable... with Love		Yes		
1991	Natalie Cole	"Unforgettable"	Unforgettable... with Love		Yes	Yes	
1991	Barbra Streisand	"I Know Him So Well"	Just For The Record...		Yes	Yes	Yes
1991	Kenny Loggins	"The Real Thing"	Leap Of Faith	Yes			Yes
1991	Kenny Loggins	"I Would Do Anything"	Leap Of Faith	Yes			
1991	Linda Ronstadt	"Dreams To Dream (Finale Version)"	An American Tail: Fievel Goes West: Original Soundtrack		Yes	Yes	Yes
1991	Meryl Streep	"Gartan Mother's Lullaby"	For Our Children			Yes	Yes
1991	Robin McAuley	"Teach Me How To Dream"	If Looks Could Kill: Original Soundtrack	Yes	Yes	Yes	Yes
1991	Bill Ross	"Michael Corben's Adventure"	If Looks Could Kill: Original Soundtrack	Yes	Yes	Yes	Yes
1991	Stephen Bishop	"All I Want"	All I Want For Christmas: Original Soundtrack	Yes	Yes	Yes	Yes
1991	Aretha Franklin and Michael McDonald	"Ever Changing Times"	What You See Is What You Sweat				Yes
1991	Yukiko Ito	"Insincere"	Good Times, Bad Times		Yes	Yes	Yes
1991	Yukiko Ito	"Could’a Fooled Me"	Good Times, Bad Times	Yes	Yes	Yes	Yes
1991	Chicago	"Explain It to My Heart"	Twenty 1				Yes
1992	Whitney Houston	"I Will Always Love You"	The Bodyguard: Original Soundtrack		Yes	Yes	Yes
1992	Whitney Houston	"I Have Nothing"	The Bodyguard: Original Soundtrack	Yes	Yes	Yes	Yes
1992	Whitney Houston	"Run to You"	The Bodyguard: Original Soundtrack		Yes	Yes	Yes
1992	Kenny G and Aaron Neville	"Even If My Heart Would Break"	The Bodyguard: Original Soundtrack		Yes	Yes	
1992	Michael Bolton	"Since I Fell for You"	Timeless: The Classics		Yes	Yes	
1992	Michael Bolton	"To Love Somebody"	Timeless: The Classics		Yes	Yes	Yes
1992	Michael Bolton	"You Send Me"	Timeless: The Classics		Yes	Yes	
1992	Michael Bolton	"Yesterday"	Timeless: The Classics		Yes	Yes	Yes
1992	Michael Bolton	"Bring It On Home to Me"	Timeless: The Classics		Yes	Yes	
1992	Michael Bolton	"White Christmas"	Timeless: The Classics		Yes	Yes	
1992	Peter Cetera	"Even a Fool Can See"	World Falling Down		Yes		
1992	Peter Cetera	"The Last Place God Made"	World Falling Down		Yes		Yes
1992	Shanice	"Saving Forever for You"	Beverly Hills, 90210: Original Soundtrack		Yes	Yes	Yes
1992	Miki Howard	"Shining Through"	Femme Fatale	Yes	Yes	Yes	Yes
1992	Miki Howard	"New Fire from An Old Flame"	Femme Fatale		Yes	Yes	Yes
1992	Sheena Easton	"A Dream Worth Keeping"	FernGully: The Last Rainforest: Original Soundtrack		Yes	Yes	Yes
1992	Carl Anderson	"If Not For Love"	Fantasy Hotel	Yes		Yes	Yes
1992	Kenny G	"By the Time This Night Is Over"	Breathless		Yes		
1992	Michael W.Smith	"Somewhere Somehow"	Change Your World	Yes			
1992	Rachelle Ferrell	"Could've Fooled Me"	Rachelle Ferrell	Yes			
1992	Alan Silvestri	"The Grotto Song"	FernGully:The Last Rainforest (Original Score And Sounds Of The Rainforest) (NOT Original Soundtrack)		Yes	Yes	Yes
1992	Ukulele	"黃絲帶"	Yellow Ribbon		Yes	Yes	Yes
1992	Ukulele	"流星"	Yellow Ribbon		Yes	Yes	Yes
1992	Ukulele	"等待是一生最初蒼老"	Yellow Ribbon		Yes	Yes	Yes
1992	Ukulele	"飄裊"	Yellow Ribbon		Yes	Yes	Yes
1992	Morry Stearns	"In The Quiet Night"	Power In Our Hands				Yes
1993	Barbra Streisand	"Some Enchanted Evening"	Back to Broadway		Yes	Yes	
1993	Barbra Streisand	"Everybody Says Don't"	Back to Broadway		Yes		
1993	Barbra Streisand	"The Music of the Night"	Back to Broadway		Yes		
1993	Barbra Streisand	"Speak Low"	Back to Broadway		Yes	Yes	Yes
1993	Barbra Streisand	"I Have a Love/One Hand, One Heart"	Back to Broadway		Yes	Yes	Yes
1993	Barbra Streisand	"I've Never Been in Love Before"	Back to Broadway		Yes		
1993	Barbra Streisand	"Luck Be a Lady"	Back to Broadway		Yes		
1993	Barbra Streisand	"The Man I Love"	Back to Broadway		Yes		
1993	Celine Dion	"The Power of Love"	The Colour of My Love		Yes	Yes	Yes
1993	Celine Dion	"The Colour of My Love"	The Colour of My Love	Yes	Yes	Yes	Yes
1993	Celine Dion and Clive Griffin	"When I Fall in Love"	Sleepless in Seattle: Original Soundtrack		Yes	Yes	Yes
1993	Frank Sinatra and Barbra Streisand	"I've Got a Crush on You"	Duets		Yes		
1993	Roch Voisine	"I'll Always Be There"	I'll Always Be There	Yes	Yes	Yes	Yes
1993	Michael Bolton	"Completely"	The One Thing		Yes	Yes	Yes
1993	Michael Bolton	"In The Arms Of Love"	The One Thing		Yes		
1993	Miki Howard	"What a Little Moonlight Can Do"	Miki Sings Billie (A Tribute To Billie Holiday)		Yes		
1993	Miki Howard	"I'm a Fool to Want You"	Miki Sings Billie (A Tribute To Billie Holiday)		Yes		
1993	Miki Howard	"My Man"	Miki Sings Billie (A Tribute To Billie Holiday)		Yes		
1993	Miki Howard	"Solitude"	Miki Sings Billie (A Tribute To Billie Holiday)		Yes		
1993	Miki Howard	"'Tain't Nobody's Bizness If I Do"	Miki Sings Billie (A Tribute To Billie Holiday)		Yes		
1993	Color Me Badd	"Wildflower"	Time And Chance		Yes	Yes	Yes
1993	Color Me Badd	"Close To Heaven"	Time And Chance		Yes	Yes	Yes
1993	Color Me Badd	"Let's Start With Forever"	Time And Chance		Yes	Yes	Yes
1993	Dolly Parton and James Ingram	"The Day I Fall In Love"	Beethoven's 2nd: Original Soundtrack		Yes	Yes	Yes
1993	Lisa Fischer	"Colors Of Love"	Made In America: Original Soundtrack		Yes	Yes	Yes
1993	Carman	"The River"	The Standard		Yes		
1993	Carman	"Serve The Lord"	The Absolute Best		Yes	Yes	Yes
1993	Jay Graydon	"After The Love Is Gone"	Airplay For The Planet	Yes			Yes
1993	Jay Graydon	"When You Look In My Eyes"	Airplay For The Planet				Yes
1993	Taylor Dayne	"Send Me a Lover"	Soul Dancing				Yes
1994	Kenny Rogers	"I Remember You"	Timepiece		Yes		
1994	Kenny Rogers	"But Beautiful"	Timepiece		Yes		
1994	Kenny Rogers	"When I Fall in Love"	Timepiece		Yes		
1994	Kenny Rogers	"Love Is Here to Stay"	Timepiece		Yes		
1994	Kenny Rogers	"The Nearness of You"	Timepiece		Yes		
1994	Kenny Rogers	"My Funny Valentine"	Timepiece		Yes		
1994	Kenny Rogers	"Love Is Just Around the Corner"	Timepiece		Yes	Yes	
1994	Kenny Rogers	"Where or When"	Timepiece		Yes		
1994	Kenny Rogers	"My Romance"	Timepiece		Yes		
1994	Kenny Rogers	"In the Wee Small Hours of the Morning"	Timepiece		Yes		
1994	Kenny Rogers	"I Get Along Without You Very Well"	Timepiece		Yes		
1994	Kenny Rogers	"You Are So Beautiful"	Timepiece		Yes		Yes
1994	Peabo Bryson	"Why Goodbye"	Through The Fire		Yes	Yes	
1994	Peabo Bryson	"Through the Fire"	Through The Fire	Yes	Yes	Yes	Yes
1994	Peabo Bryson	"By the Time This Night Is Over"	Through The Fire		Yes		
1994	Peabo Bryson	"You Can Have Me Anytime"	Through The Fire	Yes	Yes	Yes	
1994	BeBe & CeCe Winans	"Don't Let Me Walk This Road Alone"	Relationships	Yes	Yes	Yes	Yes
1994	BeBe & CeCe Winans	"These What Abouts"	Relationships		Yes	Yes	Yes
1994	Julio Iglesias	"When You Tell Me That You Love Me"	Crazy		Yes	Yes	Yes
1994	Anne Murray	"Now and Forever (You and Me)"	The Best... So Far	Yes	Yes	Yes	Yes
1994	Anne Murray	"Over You"	The Best... So Far	Yes	Yes	Yes	Yes
1994	All-4-One	"Oh Girl"	All-4-One		Yes		
1994	All-4-One	"I Swear"	All-4-One		Yes		
1994	Chris Walker	"Teach Me How To Dream"	One Life To Live: Original Soundtrack	Yes			
1994	Warren Wiebe	"Goodbye"	One Life To Live: Original Soundtrack	Yes	Yes	Yes	Yes
1994	Babyface and Lisa Stansfield	"Dream Away"	The Pagemaster: Original Soundtrack		Yes	Yes	Yes
1994	Take 6	"You Can Never Ask Too Much (Of Love)"	Join the Band	Yes	Yes	Yes	Yes
1994	Gerald Levert	"I'd Give Anything"	Groove On		Yes	Yes	Yes
1994	Myriam Hernández	"Por Siempre Juntos"	Myriam Hernández IV	Yes		Yes	Yes
1994	Sally Yeh and James Ingram	"I Believe in Love"	You Are Free (Sally Yeh's album)	Yes			
1995	The Corrs	"Erin Shore" (Traditional Intro) (Instrumental)	Forgiven, Not Forgotten		Yes	Yes	
1995	The Corrs	"Forgiven, Not Forgotten"	Forgiven, Not Forgotten		Yes	Yes	Yes
1995	The Corrs	"Heaven Knows"	Forgiven, Not Forgotten		Yes	Yes	Yes
1995	The Corrs	"Along with the Girls" (Instrumental)	Forgiven, Not Forgotten		Yes	Yes	
1995	The Corrs	"Someday"	Forgiven, Not Forgotten	Yes	Yes	Yes	Yes
1995	The Corrs	"Runaway"	Forgiven, Not Forgotten		Yes	Yes	Yes
1995	The Corrs	"The Right Time"	Forgiven, Not Forgotten		Yes	Yes	Yes
1995	The Corrs	"The Minstrel Boy" (Instrumental)	Forgiven, Not Forgotten		Yes	Yes	
1995	The Corrs	"Toss the Feathers" (instrumental)	Forgiven, Not Forgotten		Yes	Yes	
1995	The Corrs	"Love to Love You"	Forgiven, Not Forgotten		Yes	Yes	Yes
1995	The Corrs	"Secret Life"	Forgiven, Not Forgotten		Yes	Yes	Yes
1995	The Corrs	"Carraroe Jig" (Instrumental)	Forgiven, Not Forgotten		Yes	Yes	
1995	The Corrs	"Closer"	Forgiven, Not Forgotten		Yes	Yes	Yes
1995	The Corrs	"Leave Me Alone"	Forgiven, Not Forgotten		Yes	Yes	Yes
1995	The Corrs	"Erin Shore" (Instrumental)	Forgiven, Not Forgotten		Yes	Yes	
1995	Michael Jackson	"Childhood"	HIStory		Yes	Yes	Yes
1995	Michael Jackson	"Smile"	HIStory		Yes	Yes	Yes
1995	Michael Jackson	"Earth Song"	HIStory		Yes	Yes	Yes
1995	Madonna	"You'll See"	Something To Remember	Yes	Yes	Yes	
1995	Madonna	"One More Chance"	Something To Remember	Yes	Yes	Yes	
1995	Sheena Easton	"You've Learned to Live without Me"	My Cherie	Yes	Yes	Yes	Yes
1995	Sheena Easton	"Crazy Love"	My Cherie		Yes	Yes	Yes
1995	Quincy Jones	"Moody's Mood for Love"	Q's Jook Joint				Yes
1995	U.N.V.	"So In Love With You"	Universal Nubian Voices	Yes	Yes	Yes	Yes
1995	All-4-One	"I Can Love You Like That"	And The Music Speaks		Yes	Yes	Yes
1995	Rod Stewart	"So Far Away"	Tapestry Revisited		Yes	Yes	Yes
1995	Celine Dion	"(You Make Me Feel Like) A Natural Woman"	Tapestry Revisited		Yes	Yes	Yes
1995	Celine Dion	"To Love You More"	Single in Japan	Yes	Yes	Yes	Yes
1995	Bonnie Tyler	"Bridge over Troubled Water"	Free Spirit		Yes	Yes	Yes
1995	Wendy Moten	"Your Love Is All I Know"	Time For Change		Yes	Yes	Yes
1995	Wendy Moten	"All That My Heart Can Hold"	Time For Change	Yes	Yes	Yes	Yes
1995	Bruce Roberts	"When Love Goes"	Intimacy		Yes	Yes	Yes
1995	Curtis Stigers	"This Time"	Time Was		Yes	Yes	Yes
1995	Jordan Hill	"Remember Me This Way"	Casper: Original Soundtrack	Yes	Yes	Yes	Yes
1995	Anita Baker and James Ingram	"When You Love Someone"	Forget Paris: Original Soundtrack		Yes	Yes	Yes
1996	Celine Dion	"Because You Loved Me"	Falling Into You		Yes	Yes	
1996	Celine Dion	"All by Myself"	Falling Into You		Yes	Yes	
1996	Celine Dion	"I Love You"	Falling Into You		Yes	Yes	
1996	Celine Dion	"The Power of the Dream"	Falling Into You	Yes	Yes	Yes	Yes
1996	Jordan Hill	"What Am I Doing Here"	Rhythm Of The Games (1996 Olympic Games Album)	Yes	Yes	Yes	Yes
1996	Jordan Hill	"For The Love Of You"	Jordan Hill		Yes		Yes
1996	Jordan Hill	"How Many Times"	Jordan Hill	Yes	Yes	Yes	Yes
1996	Jordan Hill	"Slip Away"	Jordan Hill	Yes		Yes	Yes
1996	Jordan Hill	"Got To Be Real"	Jordan Hill	Yes			
1996	Jordan Hill	"I Just Had To Hear Your Voice"	Jordan Hill		Yes		Yes
1996	Jordan Hill	"Ride"	Jordan Hill		Yes		
1996	Jordan Hill	"Too Much Heaven"	Jordan Hill		Yes	Yes	
1996	Jordan Hill	"Never Should Have Let You Go"	Jordan Hill	Yes	Yes	Yes	Yes
1996	Jordan Hill	"Until The End Of Time"	Jordan Hill	Yes	Yes	Yes	Yes
1996	Jordan Hill	"Remember Me This Way"	Jordan Hill	Yes	Yes	Yes	Yes
1996	Toni Braxton	"Un-Break My Heart"	Secrets		Yes	Yes	Yes
1996	Celine Dion	"Brahms' Lullaby"	For Our Children Too		Yes	Yes	Yes
1996	Cher	"A Dream Is A Wish Your Heart Makes"	For Our Children Too		Yes	Yes	Yes
1996	Babyface	"If"	For Our Children Too		Yes	Yes	Yes
1996	Faith Hill	"Over The Rainbow"	For Our Children Too		Yes	Yes	Yes
1996	Toni Braxton	"Brown Baby"	For Our Children Too		Yes	Yes	Yes
1996	Natalie Cole	"Both Sides Now"	For Our Children Too		Yes	Yes	Yes
1996	David Foster and Friends	"Love Lights The World"	For Our Children Too	Yes	Yes	Yes	Yes
1996	Barbra Streisand and Bryan Adams	"I Finally Found Someone"	The Mirror Has Two Faces: Original Soundtrack		Yes	Yes	Yes
1996	Barbra Streisand	"All Of My Life"	The Mirror Has Two Faces: Original Soundtrack		Yes	Yes	Yes
1996	Natalie Cole	"Stardust"	Stardust		Yes	Yes	
1996	Natalie Cole	"When I Fall in Love"	Stardust		Yes	Yes	
1996	Natalie Cole	"To Whom It May Concern"	Stardust		Yes	Yes	
1996	Natalie Cole	"This Morning It Was Summer"	Stardust		Yes	Yes	
1996	Vanessa Williams	"Where Do We Go from Here"	Greatest Hits: The First Ten Years	Yes	Yes	Yes	Yes
1996	Whitney Houston	"I Believe In You And Me (Single Version)"	The Preacher's Wife: Original Soundtrack		Yes	Yes	
1996	Paul Anka and Anthea Anka and Barry Gibb	"Yo Te Amo (Do I Love You)"	Amigos		Yes	Yes	Yes
1996	Paul Anka and Celine Dion	"Mejor Decir Adios (It's Hard To Say Goodbye)"	Amigos		Yes	Yes	Yes
1996	Lionel Richie	"Climbing"	Louder Than Words		Yes	Yes	
1996	Michael Bolton	"White Christmas"	This Is The Time - The Christmas Album		Yes		
1996	Beth Hart Band	"Spiders in My Bed"	Immortal		Yes		
1996	Beth Hart Band	"Hold Me Through the Night"	Immortal		Yes		Yes
1996	Beth Hart Band	"Summer Is Gone"	Immortal		Yes		
1996	Bruce Roberts and Donna Summer	"Whenever There Is Love"	Daylight: Original Soundtrack		Yes	Yes	Yes
1996	Kevin Sharp	"Nobody Knows"	Measure Of A Man				Yes
1996	Scorpions	"When You Came Into My Life" (New version)	Pure Instinct (uncredited)		Yes	Yes	Yes
1996	Tony Smith	"I Will"	A Touch Of China			Yes	
1996	Tony Smith	"Moon On Your Face"	A Touch Of China			Yes	
1996	Tony Smith	"Farewell Kisses"	A Touch Of China			Yes	
1996	Tony Smith	"Lone Rain, Lonely Heart"	A Touch Of China			Yes	
1996	Tony Smith	"Silly"	A Touch Of China			Yes	
1996	Tony Smith	"The One Who Loves"	A Touch Of China			Yes	
1996	Tony Smith	"Understanding"	A Touch Of China			Yes	
1996	Tony Smith	"Love Declaration"	A Touch Of China			Yes	
1996	Tony Smith	"Stolen Heart"	A Touch Of China			Yes	
1996	Tony Smith	"Straight From My Heart"	A Touch Of China			Yes	
1996	Tony Smith	"Portion Of Love"	A Touch Of China			Yes	
1996	Tony Smith	"Butterfly Dreams"	A Touch Of China			Yes	
1997	Celine Dion	"Why Oh Why"	Let's Talk About Love		Yes	Yes	Yes
1997	Celine Dion	"When I Need You"	Let's Talk About Love		Yes	Yes	Yes
1997	Celine Dion	"To Love You More"	Let's Talk About Love	Yes	Yes	Yes	Yes
1997	Celine Dion	"Let's Talk About Love"	Let's Talk About Love		Yes	Yes	Yes
1997	Celine Dion and Barbra Streisand	"Tell Him"	Let's Talk About Love	Yes	Yes	Yes	Yes
1997	Celine Dion and Luciano Pavarotti	"I Hate You Then I Love You"	Let's Talk About Love		Yes	Yes	Yes
1997	The Corrs	"When He's Not Around"	Talk On Corners		Yes	Yes	Yes
1997	The Corrs	"I Never Loved You Anyway"	Talk On Corners		Yes	Yes	
1997	The Corrs	"Don't Say You Love Me"	Talk On Corners		Yes	Yes	Yes
1997	The Corrs	"Intimacy"	Talk On Corners				Yes
1997	The Corrs	"No Good for Me"	Talk On Corners		Yes	Yes	Yes
1997	David Foster and The Boys Choir Of Harlem	"Jesu, Joy Of Man's Desiring"	Angelica			Yes	Yes
1997	Bee Gees	"I Surrender"	Still Waters		Yes		
1997	Bee Gees	"I Could Not Love You More"	Still Waters		Yes		Yes
1997	David Foster	"Water Fountain"	Songs Without Words	Yes		Yes	Yes
1997	Samantha Cole	"Without You"	Samantha Cole	Yes	Yes	Yes	Yes
1997	Samantha Cole	"You Light Up My Life"	Samantha Cole		Yes	Yes	Yes
1997	Samantha Cole	"I'm Right Here"	Samantha Cole		Yes	Yes	Yes
1997	Gary Barlow	"So Help Me Girl"	Open Road		Yes	Yes	Yes
1997	Gary Barlow	"I Fall So Deep"	Open Road		Yes	Yes	Yes
1997	Patti LaBelle	"You Are My Solid Ground"	Flame	Yes	Yes	Yes	Yes
1997	Patti LaBelle	"Does He Love You"	Flame		Yes	Yes	Yes
1997	En Vouge	"Too Gone, Too Long"	EV3		Yes	Yes	Yes
1997	Jon B.	"Tu Amor"	Cool Relax		Yes	Yes	Yes
1997	Kenny G	"You Send Me"	Greatest Hits		Yes	Yes	
1997	Kenny Loggins	"The Unimaginable Life"	The Unimaginable Life	Yes			
1997	Richard Marx	"Talk To Ya Later"	Flesh And Bone	Yes			
1998	LeAnn Rimes	"Looking Through Your Eyes"	Quest for Camelot: Original Soundtrack	Yes			
1998	Steve Perry	"I Stand Alone"	Quest for Camelot: Original Soundtrack	Yes	Yes	Yes	Yes
1998	Steve Perry	"United We Stand"	Quest for Camelot: Original Soundtrack	Yes	Yes	Yes	Yes
1998	Celine Dion	"The Prayer"	Quest for Camelot: Original Soundtrack	Yes	Yes	Yes	Yes
1998	The Corrs	"On My Father`s Wings"	Quest for Camelot: Original Soundtrack	Yes	Yes	Yes	Yes
1998	The Corrs And Bryan White	"Looking Through Your Eyes"	Quest for Camelot: Original Soundtrack	Yes	Yes	Yes	Yes
1998	Gary Oldman	"Ruber"	Quest for Camelot: Original Soundtrack	Yes	Yes	Yes	Yes
1998	Bryan White	"I Stand All Alone"	Quest for Camelot: Original Soundtrack	Yes	Yes	Yes	Yes
1998	Eric Idle And Don Rickles	"If I Didn't Have You"	Quest for Camelot: Original Soundtrack	Yes	Yes	Yes	Yes
1998	David Foster	"Looking Through Your Eyes (Instrumental)"	Quest for Camelot: Original Soundtrack	Yes	Yes	Yes	Yes
1998	Andrea Bocelli	"The Prayer"	Quest for Camelot: Original Soundtrack	Yes	Yes	Yes	Yes
1998	Monica	"Inside"	The Boy Is Mine		Yes	Yes	Yes
1998	Monica	"Right Here Waiting"	The Boy Is Mine		Yes	Yes	Yes
1998	Monica	"For You I Will"	The Boy Is Mine		Yes	Yes	Yes
1998	Brandy	"Have You Ever?"	Never Say Never		Yes	Yes	Yes
1998	Brandy	"One Voice"	Never Say Never		Yes	Yes	Yes
1998	Brandy	"(Everything I Do) I Do It for You"	Never Say Never		Yes	Yes	Yes
1998	Whitney Houston	"I Learned from the Best"	My Love Is Your Love		Yes	Yes	Yes
1998	Bette Midler	"My One True Friend"	Bathhouse Betty	Yes	Yes	Yes	Yes
1998	Paul Anka and Celine Dion	"It's Hard To Say Goodbye"	A Body Of Work		Yes	Yes	Yes
1998	Paul Anka and Tevin Campbell	"One Kiss"	A Body Of Work		Yes	Yes	Yes
1998	Paul Anka and Anthea Anka	"Do I Love You"	A Body Of Work		Yes	Yes	Yes
1998	Paul Anka and Patti LaBelle	"You Are My Destiny"	A Body Of Work		Yes	Yes	Yes
1998	Paul Anka and Peter Cetera	"Hold Me 'Til The Morning Comes"	A Body Of Work	Yes	Yes	Yes	Yes
1998	Celine Dion	"O Holy Night"	These Are Special Times		Yes	Yes	Yes
1998	Celine Dion	"Blue Christmas"	These Are Special Times		Yes	Yes	Yes
1998	Celine Dion	"Ave Maria"	These Are Special Times		Yes	Yes	Yes
1998	Celine Dion	"Adeste Fideles (O Come All Ye Faithful)"	These Are Special Times		Yes	Yes	
1998	Celine Dion	"The Christmas Song (Chestnuts Roasting on an Open Fire)"	These Are Special Times		Yes	Yes	
1998	Celine Dion	"Brahms' Lullaby"	These Are Special Times		Yes	Yes	Yes
1998	Celine Dion	"These Are the Special Times"	These Are Special Times		Yes	Yes	Yes
1998	Celine Dion and Andrea Bocelli	"The Prayer"	These Are Special Times	Yes	Yes	Yes	Yes
1998	Lionel Richie	"I Hear Your Voice"	Time	Yes	Yes	Yes	Yes
1998	Lionel Richie	"The Closest Thing to Heaven"	Time		Yes	Yes	Yes
1998	Olivia Newton-John	"I Honestly Love You"	Back with a Heart		Yes	Yes	Yes
1998	Deborah Cox	"One Day You Will"	One Wish		Yes	Yes	Yes
1998	Nicole Renée	"How Many Times"	Nicole Renée		Yes	Yes	Yes
1998	Dru Hill	"What Do I Do With The Love"	Enter The Dru		Yes	Yes	
1998	Jennifer Love Hewitt	"How Do I Deal"	I Still Know What You Did Last Summer: Original Soundtrack		Yes		
1998	Kevin Sharp	"I'm Trying"	Love Is		Yes		
1998	Kevin Sharp	"What Other Man"	Love Is		Yes		
1998	Kevin Sharp	"Her Heart Is Only Human"	Love Is		Yes		
1998	Ricky Jones	"Still In Love"	Ricky Jones				Yes
1999	Celine Dion	"The First Time Ever I Saw Your Face"	All The Way... A Decade Of Song		Yes	Yes	Yes
1999	Celine Dion	"Then You Look at Me"	All The Way... A Decade Of Song		Yes	Yes	
1999	Celine Dion	"Live (for the One I Love)"	All The Way... A Decade Of Song		Yes	Yes	Yes
1999	Celine Dion and Frank Sinatra	"All the Way"	All The Way... A Decade Of Song		Yes	Yes	Yes
1999	Faith Hill	"Let Me Let Go"	Music From And Inspired By The Motion Picture Message In A Bottle (NOT Original Soundtrack)		Yes	Yes	Yes
1999	Nine Sky Wonder	"Somewhere In The Middle"	Music From And Inspired By The Motion Picture Message In A Bottle (NOT Original Soundtrack)		Yes	Yes	Yes
1999	Anna Nordell	"I'll Still Love You Then"	Music From And Inspired By The Motion Picture Message In A Bottle (NOT Original Soundtrack)	Yes	Yes	Yes	Yes
1999	Laura Pausini	"One More Time"	Music From And Inspired By The Motion Picture Message In A Bottle (NOT Original Soundtrack)		Yes	Yes	Yes
1999	Mariah Carey	"After Tonight"	Rainbow	Yes	Yes	Yes	Yes
1999	Barbra Stereisand and Vince Gill	"If You Ever Leave Me"	A Love Like Ours		Yes	Yes	Yes
1999	Barbra Stereisand	"If I Didn't Love You"	A Love Like Ours		Yes	Yes	Yes
1999	Quincy Jones	"If This Time Is The Last Time"	From Q with Love	Yes			Yes
1999	Enrique Iglesias and Whitney Houston	"Could I Have This Kiss Forever"	Enrique		Yes	Yes	Yes
1999	Lace	"Angel"	Lace		Yes	Yes	Yes
1999	Lace	"I Cry Real Tears"	Lace		Yes		
1999	Lace	"Swept Away"	Lace		Yes	Yes	Yes
1999	Gloria Estefan and NSYNC	"Music of My Heart"	Music of the Heart: Original Soundtrack		Yes	Yes	
1999	Natalie Cole	"Snowfall on the Sahara"	Snowfalls On The Sahara		Yes	Yes	
1999	Natalie Cole	"With My Eyes Wide Open I'm Dreaming"	Snowfalls On The Sahara		Yes	Yes	
1999	Smokey Robinson	"Love Love Again"	Intimate	Yes	Yes	Yes	Yes
1999	Kenny G	"What A Wonderful World"	Classics In The Key Of G		Yes		Yes
1999	Diana Krall	"Why Should I Care" (hidden track)	When I Look in Your Eyes		Yes	Yes	
1999	All-4-One	"I Will Be Right Here"	On And On		Yes	Yes	Yes
1999	Tevin Campbell	"Everything You Are"	Tevin Campbell	Yes			
1999	Shola Ama	"This Time Next Year"	In Return	Yes			

00s

Year	Artist	Song	Album	Composer	Producer	Arranger	Keyboards
2000	Toni Braxton	"Spanish Guitar"	The Heat		Yes	Yes	Yes
2000	Toni Braxton	"I'm Still Breathing"	The Heat		Yes	Yes	Yes
2000	Plus One	"God Is in This Place"	The Promise		Yes	Yes	Yes
2000	Plus One	"The Promise"	The Promise		Yes	Yes	Yes
2000	Plus One	"Last Flight Out"	The Promise		Yes	Yes	Yes
2000	Plus One	"My Friend"	The Promise		Yes	Yes	Yes
2000	Donna Summer	"The Power of One"	Pokémon The Movie 2000: Original Soundtrack		Yes	Yes	
2000	Denisse Lara	"One"	Pokémon The Movie 2000: Original Soundtrack		Yes		
2000	Garou	"Que L'amour Est Violent"	Seul			Yes	
2000	Garou	"L'adieu"	Seul		Yes	Yes	Yes
2000	Trisha Yearwood	"For Only You"	Sex and the City: Music from the HBO Series				Yes
2001	Josh Groban	"Alla Luce del Sole"	Josh Groban		Yes	Yes	Yes
2001	Josh Groban	"Gira con me questa notte"	Josh Groban	Yes	Yes	Yes	
2001	Josh Groban	"You're Still You"	Josh Groban		Yes	Yes	Yes
2001	Josh Groban	"Aléjate"	Josh Groban		Yes	Yes	Yes
2001	Josh Groban	"Vincent (Starry, Starry Night)"	Josh Groban		Yes	Yes	Yes
2001	Josh Groban	"Un Amore per Sempre"	Josh Groban		Yes	Yes	Yes
2001	Josh Groban	"Home to Stay"	Josh Groban		Yes	Yes	Yes
2001	Josh Groban and The Corrs	"Canto Alla Vita"	Josh Groban		Yes		
2001	Josh Groban and Lili Haydn	"Jesu, Joy of Man's Desiring"	Josh Groban		Yes	Yes	Yes
2001	Josh Groban and Charlotte Church	"The Prayer"	Josh Groban	Yes	Yes	Yes	Yes
2001	Eden's Crush	"Love This Way"	Popstars		Yes		
2001	Eden's Crush	"Promise Me"	Popstars	Yes	Yes	Yes	Yes
2001	Carole King	"It Could Have Been Anyone"	Love Makes The World	Yes	Yes	Yes	Yes
2001	Celine Dion	"God Bless America"	God Bless America		Yes	Yes	Yes
2001	Mariah Carey	"There for Me"	Never Too Far / Hero Medley (Single: B-side)	Yes	Yes	Yes	Yes
2001	Lara Fabian	"For Always"	A.I. Artificial Intelligence: Original Soundtrack		Yes	Yes	Yes
2001	Lara Fabian and Josh Groban	"For Always (Duet)"	A.I. Artificial Intelligence: Original Soundtrack		Yes	Yes	Yes
2001	Nicole Kidman and Ewan McGregor	"Come What May"	Moulin Rouge!: Original Soundtrack		Yes		
2001	Nita Whitaker	"Heaven Holds The Ones I Love"	One Voice	Yes	Yes	Yes	Yes
2001	Edwin McCain	"I Don't Know How I Got By"	The Family Man: Original Soundtrack		Yes		
2001	Barbra Streisand	"I'll Be Home For Christmas"	Christmas Memories				Yes
2001	Barbra Streisand	"Grown-Up Christmas List"	Christmas Memories	Yes	Yes	Yes	Yes
2001	Andrea Bocelli	"Mille Lune Mille Onde"	Cieli Di Toscana	Yes			
2001	Andrea Bocelli	"Chiara"	Cieli Di Toscana	Yes			
2001	Radioactive	"Grace"	Ceremony Of Innocence				Yes
2002	LeAnn Rimes	"Light the Fire Within"	Salt Lake 2002 Official Music Of The Games	Yes	Yes	Yes	Yes
2002	Barbra Streisand and Josh Groban	"All I Know of Love"	Duets	Yes	Yes	Yes	
2002	David Foster	"World Children's Day Anthem (Prelude)"	"The Concert For World Children's Day" (DVD)	Yes	Yes	Yes	Yes
2002	David Foster and Friends	"Aren't They All Our Children"	"The Concert For World Children's Day" (DVD)	Yes	Yes	Yes	Yes
2002	Nita Whitaker	"God Bless The Heartaches"	The Rising Place: Original Soundtrack	Yes	Yes	Yes	Yes
2002	Filippa Giordano	"Il Rosso Amore"	Il Rosso Amore	Yes			
2003	Michael Bublé	"Fever"	Michael Bublé		Yes	Yes	
2003	Michael Bublé	"Moondance"	Michael Bublé		Yes	Yes	
2003	Michael Bublé	"Kissing a Fool"	Michael Bublé		Yes	Yes	Yes
2003	Michael Bublé	"For Once in My Life"	Michael Bublé		Yes		
2003	Michael Bublé	"How Can You Mend a Broken Heart"	Michael Bublé		Yes	Yes	Yes
2003	Michael Bublé	"Summer Wind"	Michael Bublé		Yes		
2003	Michael Bublé	"You'll Never Find Another Love like Mine"	Michael Bublé		Yes	Yes	Yes
2003	Michael Bublé	"Crazy Little Thing Called Love"	Michael Bublé		Yes	Yes	Yes
2003	Michael Bublé	"Put Your Head on My Shoulder"	Michael Bublé		Yes	Yes	
2003	Michael Bublé	"Sway"	Michael Bublé		Yes	Yes	Yes
2003	Michael Bublé	"The Way You Look Tonight"	Michael Bublé		Yes	Yes	Yes
2003	Michael Bublé	"Come Fly with Me"	Michael Bublé		Yes		
2003	Michael Bublé	"That's All"	Michael Bublé		Yes		
2003	Michael Bublé	"Let It Snow! Let It Snow! Let It Snow!"	Let It Snow!		Yes	Yes	Yes
2003	Michael Bublé	"The Christmas Song"	Let It Snow!		Yes		
2003	Michael Bublé	"Grown Up Christmas List"	Let It Snow!	Yes	Yes	Yes	Yes
2003	Michael Bublé	"I'll Be Home for Christmas"	Let It Snow!		Yes	Yes	Yes
2003	Michael Bublé	"White Christmas"	Let It Snow!		Yes	Yes	Yes
2003	Josh Groban	"Oceano"	Closer		Yes		
2003	Josh Groban	"My Confession"	Closer		Yes		
2003	Josh Groban	"Si Volvieras a Mi"	Closer		Yes		
2003	Josh Groban	"When You Say You Love Me"	Closer		Yes		
2003	Josh Groban	"All'improvviso Amore"	Closer	Yes	Yes	Yes	Yes
2003	Josh Groban	"Broken Vow"	Closer		Yes		Yes
2003	Josh Groban	"Caruso"	Closer		Yes	Yes	Yes
2003	Josh Groban	"Hymne à l'amour"	Closer		Yes	Yes	Yes
2003	Josh Groban	"You Raise Me Up"	Closer		Yes	Yes	Yes
2003	Josh Groban and Joshua Bell	"Mi Mancherai (Il Postino)"	Closer		Yes	Yes	Yes
2003	Aretha Franklin	"Falling Out Of Love"	So Damn Happy				Yes
2003	Kristy Starling	"Broken"	Kristy Starling		Yes	Yes	Yes
2003	Kristy Starling	"To Where You Are"	Kristy Starling		Yes	Yes	
2003	Donnie McClurkin and Yolanda Adams	"The Prayer"	...Again	Yes	Yes	Yes	Yes
2004	Celine Dion	"Miracle"	Miracle		Yes	Yes	Yes
2004	Celine Dion	"Brahms' Lullaby"	Miracle		Yes	Yes	Yes
2004	Celine Dion	"If I Could"	Miracle		Yes	Yes	Yes
2004	Celine Dion	"Sleep Tight"	Miracle		Yes	Yes	Yes
2004	Celine Dion	"What a Wonderful World"	Miracle		Yes	Yes	Yes
2004	Celine Dion	"My Precious One"	Miracle		Yes	Yes	Yes
2004	Celine Dion	"A Mother's Prayer"	Miracle	Yes	Yes	Yes	Yes
2004	Celine Dion	"The First Time Ever I Saw Your Face"	Miracle		Yes	Yes	Yes
2004	Celine Dion	"Baby Close Your Eyes"	Miracle		Yes	Yes	Yes
2004	Celine Dion	"Come to Me"	Miracle		Yes	Yes	Yes
2004	Celine Dion	"Le loup, la biche et le chevalier (une chanson douce)"	Miracle		Yes	Yes	Yes
2004	Celine Dion	"Beautiful Boy"	Miracle		Yes	Yes	Yes
2004	Celine Dion	"In Some Small Way"	Miracle		Yes	Yes	Yes
2004	Renee Olstead	"Summertime"	Renee Olstead		Yes	Yes	
2004	Renee Olstead	"Taking A Chance On Love"	Renee Olstead		Yes		
2004	Renee Olstead	"Is You Is Or Is You Ain't My Baby"	Renee Olstead		Yes		
2004	Renee Olstead	"Someone To Watch Over Me"	Renee Olstead		Yes		
2004	Renee Olstead	"Breaking Up Is Hard To Do"	Renee Olstead		Yes	Yes	
2004	Renee Olstead	"A Love That Will Last"	Renee Olstead	Yes	Yes	Yes	Yes
2004	Renee Olstead	"Meet Me, Midnight"	Renee Olstead		Yes		
2004	Renee Olstead	"Sunday Kind Of Love"	Renee Olstead		Yes		
2004	Renee Olstead	"On a Slow Boat to China"	Renee Olstead		Yes		
2004	Renee Olstead	"What A Difference A Day Makes"	Renee Olstead		Yes		
2004	Renee Olstead	"Midnight At The Oasis"	Renee Olstead		Yes	Yes	Yes
2004	Renee Olstead	"Sentimental Journey"	Renee Olstead		Yes		
2004	William Joseph	"Within"	Within		Yes	Yes	
2004	William Joseph	"Eternal"	Within		Yes	Yes	
2004	William Joseph	"Stella's Theme"	Within	Yes	Yes	Yes	
2004	William Joseph	"Butterflies And Hurricanes"	Within		Yes	Yes	
2004	William Joseph	"Ave Maria"	Within		Yes	Yes	
2004	William Joseph	"Kashmir"	Within		Yes	Yes	
2004	William Joseph	"Homeward Bound"	Within		Yes	Yes	
2004	William Joseph	"Piano Fantasy"	Within		Yes	Yes	
2004	William Joseph	"Se Si Perde Un Amore"	Within		Yes	Yes	
2004	William Joseph	"Dust In The Wind"	Within		Yes	Yes	
2004	William Joseph	"Grace"	Within	Yes	Yes	Yes	
2004	Diana DeGarmo	"Go on and Cry"	Blue Skies	Yes	Yes	Yes	Yes
2004	Josh Groban and Tanja Tzarovska	"Remember Me"	Troy: Original Soundtrack		Yes	Yes	Yes
2004	Spin Gallery	"Grace"	Standing Tall				Yes
2005	Michael Bublé	"Feeling Good"	It's Time		Yes	Yes	
2005	Michael Bublé	"A Foggy Day (In London Town)"	It's Time		Yes		
2005	Michael Bublé	"You Don't Know Me"	It's Time		Yes	Yes	
2005	Michael Bublé	"Home"	It's Time		Yes	Yes	Yes
2005	Michael Bublé	"Can't Buy Me Love"	It's Time		Yes	Yes	
2005	Michael Bublé	"Save the Last Dance for Me"	It's Time		Yes	Yes	Yes
2005	Michael Bublé	"Try a Little Tenderness"	It's Time		Yes	Yes	
2005	Michael Bublé	"How Sweet It Is"	It's Time		Yes		Yes
2005	Michael Bublé	"I've Got You Under My Skin"	It's Time		Yes		
2005	Michael Bublé	"You and I"	It's Time		Yes	Yes	Yes
2005	Michael Bublé and Nelly Furtado	"Quando, Quando, Quando"	It's Time		Yes	Yes	Yes
2005	Michael Bublé and Chris Botti	"Song for You"	It's Time		Yes	Yes	Yes
2005	Eric Benét	"Hurricane"	Hurricane	Yes	Yes	Yes	Yes
2005	Eric Benét	"Man Enough to Cry"	Hurricane		Yes	Yes	
2005	Eric Benét	"India"	Hurricane		Yes	Yes	
2005	Eric Benét	"The Last Time"	Hurricane	Yes	Yes	Yes	Yes
2005	Eric Benét	"In the End"	Hurricane		Yes	Yes	
2005	Destiny's Child	"Stand Up for Love"	#1's	Yes	Yes	Yes	Yes
2005	Dolly Parton	"Imagine"	Those Were The Days				Yes
2005	Ricardo Montaner	"Vida Eterna"	Todo Y Nada				Yes
2005	LaToya London	"State of My Heart"	Love and Life	Yes			
2005	Earth, Wind & Fire	"Gather Round"	Sounds Of The Season: The NBC Holiday Collection (2005)	Yes	Yes	Yes	Yes
2006	Andrea Bocelli	"Amapola"	Amore		Yes	Yes	Yes
2006	Andrea Bocelli	"Besame Mucho"	Amore		Yes	Yes	Yes
2006	Andrea Bocelli	"Solamente Una Vez"	Amore		Yes	Yes	Yes
2006	Andrea Bocelli	"Pero te Extraño"	Amore		Yes	Yes	Yes
2006	Andrea Bocelli	"L'Appuntamento (Sentado à Beira do Caminho)"	Amore		Yes	Yes	Yes
2006	Andrea Bocelli	"Cuando Me Enamoro (Quando m'innamoro)"	Amore		Yes	Yes	Yes
2006	Andrea Bocelli	"Can't Help Falling in Love"	Amore		Yes	Yes	Yes
2006	Andrea Bocelli	"Because We Believe"	Amore	Yes	Yes	Yes	Yes
2006	Andrea Bocelli	"Ama Credi e Vai (Because We Believe)"	Amore	Yes	Yes	Yes	Yes
2006	Andrea Bocelli and Veronica Berti	"Les Feuilles Mortes (Autumn Leaves)"	Amore		Yes	Yes	Yes
2006	Andrea Bocelli and Kenny G	"Mi Manchi"	Amore		Yes	Yes	Yes
2006	Andrea Bocelli and Christina Aguilera	"Somos Novios (It's Impossible)"	Amore		Yes	Yes	Yes
2006	Andrea Bocelli and Mario Reyes	"Jurame"	Amore		Yes	Yes	Yes
2006	Andrea Bocelli and Stevie Wonder	"Canzoni Stonate"	Amore		Yes	Yes	Yes
2006	Josh Groban	"Un Dia Llegara"	Awake		Yes	Yes	Yes
2006	Josh Groban	"L'ultima Notte"	Awake		Yes	Yes	Yes
2006	Josh Groban	"In Her Eyes"	Awake		Yes	Yes	Yes
2006	Josh Groban	"Un Giorno Per Noi (Romeo E Giulietta)"	Awake		Yes	Yes	Yes
2006	Bianca Ryan	"Pray for a Better Day"	Bianca Ryan	Yes	Yes	Yes	Yes
2006	Katharine McPhee	"Somewhere Over The Rainbow"	single only		Yes	Yes	Yes
2006	Jay Graydon	"You Can Count On Me"	Past To Present - The 70s	Yes	Yes	Yes	Yes
2006	Jay Graydon	"You're My Day"	Past To Present - The 70s		Yes	Yes	Yes
2006	Jay Graydon	"Should We Carry On"	Past To Present - The 70s	Yes	Yes	Yes	Yes
2006	Jay Graydon	"Secret Love"	Past To Present - The 70s	Yes	Yes	Yes	Yes
2006	Jay Graydon	"Throw A Little Bit Of Love My Way"	Past To Present - The 70s	Yes		Yes	Yes
2006	Jay Graydon	"Love Flows"	Past To Present - The 70s	Yes	Yes	Yes	Yes
2006	Jay Graydon	"Ted's Theme"	Past To Present - The 70s	Yes	Yes	Yes	Yes
2007	Michael Bublé	"The Best Is Yet to Come"	Call Me Irresponsible		Yes		
2007	Michael Bublé	"It Had Better Be Tonight (Meglio Stasera)"	Call Me Irresponsible		Yes	Yes	Yes
2007	Michael Bublé	"Me and Mrs. Jones"	Call Me Irresponsible		Yes	Yes	Yes
2007	Michael Bublé	"I'm Your Man"	Call Me Irresponsible		Yes	Yes	Yes
2007	Michael Bublé	"Lost"	Call Me Irresponsible		Yes	Yes	Yes
2007	Michael Bublé	"Call Me Irresponsible"	Call Me Irresponsible		Yes		
2007	Michael Bublé	"I've Got the World on a String"	Call Me Irresponsible		Yes	Yes	Yes
2007	Michael Bublé	"Always on My Mind"	Call Me Irresponsible		Yes	Yes	Yes
2007	Michael Bublé	"That's Life"	Call Me Irresponsible		Yes	Yes	
2007	Michael Bublé	"Dream"	Call Me Irresponsible		Yes		
2007	Michael Bublé and Boyz II Men	"Comin' Home Baby"	Call Me Irresponsible		Yes	Yes	
2007	Michael Bublé and Ivan Lins	"Wonderful Tonight"	Call Me Irresponsible		Yes	Yes	Yes
2007	Peter Cincotti	"Angel Town"	East of Angel Town		Yes		
2007	Peter Cincotti	"Goodbye Philadelphia"	East of Angel Town		Yes		
2007	Peter Cincotti	"Be Careful"	East of Angel Town		Yes		
2007	Peter Cincotti	"Cinderella Beautiful"	East of Angel Town		Yes		Yes
2007	Peter Cincotti	"Make It Out Alive"	East of Angel Town		Yes		Yes
2007	Peter Cincotti	"December Boys"	East of Angel Town		Yes		
2007	Peter Cincotti	"U B U"	East of Angel Town		Yes		
2007	Peter Cincotti	"Another Falling Star"	East of Angel Town		Yes		
2007	Peter Cincotti	"Broken Children"	East of Angel Town		Yes		
2007	Peter Cincotti	"Man On A Mission"	East of Angel Town		Yes		
2007	Peter Cincotti	"Always Watching You"	East of Angel Town		Yes		
2007	Peter Cincotti	"Witch's Brew"	East of Angel Town		Yes		
2007	Peter Cincotti	"The Country Life"	East of Angel Town		Yes		
2007	Josh Groban	"Silent Night"	Noël		Yes	Yes	Yes
2007	Josh Groban	"I'll Be Home for Christmas"	Noël		Yes	Yes	Yes
2007	Josh Groban	"Ave Maria"	Noël		Yes	Yes	Yes
2007	Josh Groban	"Thankful"	Noël	Yes	Yes	Yes	Yes
2007	Josh Groban	"The Christmas Song"	Noël		Yes	Yes	
2007	Josh Groban	"What Child Is This?"	Noël		Yes	Yes	
2007	Josh Groban	"Petit Papa Noël"	Noël		Yes	Yes	Yes
2007	Josh Groban	"It Came Upon a Midnight Clear"	Noël		Yes	Yes	Yes
2007	Josh Groban	"Panis angelicus"	Noël		Yes	Yes	Yes
2007	Josh Groban and Andy McKee	"Little Drummer Boy"	Noël		Yes	Yes	
2007	Josh Groban and Brian McKnight	"Angels We Have Heard on High"	Noël		Yes	Yes	Yes
2007	Josh Groban and Faith Hill	"The First Noel"	Noël		Yes	Yes	Yes
2007	Josh Groban and the Mormon Tabernacle Choir	"O Come All Ye Faithful"	Noël		Yes	Yes	
2007	Chris Botti and Andrea Bocelli	"Italia"	Italia	Yes			Yes
2007	Olivia Newton-John and Jon Secada	"Every Time It Snows"	Christmas Wish			Yes	Yes
2007	Band From TV	"You Can't Always Get What You Want"	House M.D.: Original Soundtrack		Yes		
2008	Seal	"A Change Is Gonna Come"	Soul		Yes	Yes	
2008	Seal	"I Can't Stand the Rain"	Soul		Yes	Yes	
2008	Seal	"It's a Man's Man's Man's World"	Soul		Yes	Yes	Yes
2008	Seal	"Here I Am (Come and Take Me)"	Soul		Yes	Yes	
2008	Seal	"I've Been Loving You Too Long"	Soul		Yes	Yes	Yes
2008	Seal	"It's Alright"	Soul		Yes	Yes	
2008	Seal	"If You Don't Know Me by Now"	Soul		Yes	Yes	Yes
2008	Seal	"Knock on Wood"	Soul		Yes	Yes	
2008	Seal	"I'm Still in Love with You"	Soul		Yes	Yes	
2008	Seal	"Free"	Soul		Yes	Yes	
2008	Seal	"Stand by Me"	Soul		Yes	Yes	
2008	Seal	"People Get Ready"	Soul		Yes	Yes	
2008	William Joseph	"Standing The Storm"	Beyond		Yes		
2008	William Joseph	"Beyond"	Beyond	Yes	Yes	Yes	Yes
2008	William Joseph	"Leningrad"	Beyond		Yes		
2008	William Joseph	"Heroes"	Beyond		Yes		
2008	William Joseph	"Once Upon Love"	Beyond	Yes	Yes	Yes	Yes
2008	William Joseph	"Kashmir"	Beyond		Yes		
2008	William Joseph	"Sweet Remembrance Of You"	Beyond		Yes		
2008	William Joseph	"Apasionada"	Beyond	Yes	Yes	Yes	Yes
2008	William Joseph	"Return With Honor"	Beyond		Yes		
2008	William Joseph	"Cinema Paradiso"	Beyond		Yes	Yes	Yes
2008	William Joseph	"Asturias"	Beyond	Yes	Yes		
2008	William Joseph	"A Mother's Heart"	Beyond	Yes	Yes		
2008	Andrea Bocelli and Jane Zhang	"One World, One Dream"	unreleased	Yes	Yes	Yes	Yes
2008	Clay Aiken	"Lover All Alone"	A Thousand Different Ways	Yes			
2008	Brian McKnight and Josh Groban	"Angels We Have Heard on High"	I'll Be Home For Christmas		Yes	Yes	Yes
2008	Katharine McPhee	"I Will Be There With You"	unreleased	Yes	Yes	Yes	Yes
2009	will.i.am and David Foster, Bono, Mary J. Blige, Faith Hill, Seal	"America's Song"	unreleased	Yes	Yes	Yes	Yes
2009	Olivia Newton-John and David Foster	"Hope Is Always Here"	unreleased	Yes	Yes	Yes	Yes
2009	Katherine Jenkins	"Till There Was You"	Believe		Yes	Yes	Yes
2009	Katherine Jenkins	"Bring Me to Life"	Believe		Yes	Yes	Yes
2009	Katherine Jenkins	"Angel"	Believe		Yes	Yes	Yes
2009	Katherine Jenkins	"Fear of Falling"	Believe		Yes	Yes	Yes
2009	Katherine Jenkins	"Parla Più Piano – Love Theme From The Godfather"	Believe		Yes	Yes	Yes
2009	Katherine Jenkins	"La Vie En Rose"	Believe		Yes	Yes	Yes
2009	Katherine Jenkins	"Who Wants to Live Forever"	Believe		Yes	Yes	Yes
2009	Katherine Jenkins	"Se Si Perde Un Amore"	Believe		Yes	Yes	Yes
2009	Katherine Jenkins and Andrea Bocelli	"I Believe"	Believe		Yes	Yes	Yes
2009	Katherine Jenkins and André Rieu	"Ancora Non Sai"	Believe	Yes	Yes	Yes	Yes
2009	Katherine Jenkins and Cody Carey	"No Woman, No Cry"	Believe		Yes	Yes	
2009	Katherine Jenkins and Chris Botti	"La Califfa"	Believe		Yes	Yes	Yes
2009	Renee Olstead	"Midnight Man"	Skylark	Yes	Yes	Yes	Yes
2009	Renee Olstead	"Lover Man"	Skylark		Yes	Yes	
2009	Renee Olstead	"Stars Fell On Alabama"	Skylark		Yes	Yes	
2009	Renee Olstead	"My Baby Just Cares For Me"	Skylark		Yes	Yes	Yes
2009	Renee Olstead	"When I Fall In Love"	Skylark		Yes	Yes	
2009	Renee Olstead	"Thanks For The Boogie Ride"	Skylark		Yes		
2009	Renee Olstead	"Hold Me Now"	Skylark	Yes	Yes	Yes	Yes
2009	Renee Olstead	"Skylark"	Skylark		Yes	Yes	Yes
2009	Renee Olstead	"Midnight In Austin Texas"	Skylark	Yes	Yes	Yes	Yes
2009	Renee Olstead	"Hit The Road Jack"	Skylark		Yes	Yes	
2009	Renee Olstead	"You've Changed"	Skylark		Yes	Yes	
2009	Renee Olstead	"Ain't We Got Fun"	Skylark		Yes		
2009	Renee Olstead	"Nothing But The Blame"	Skylark	Yes	Yes	Yes	Yes
2009	Michael Bublé	"Cry Me a River"	Crazy Love		Yes	Yes	Yes
2009	Michael Bublé	"All of Me"	Crazy Love		Yes		
2009	Michael Bublé	"Georgia on My Mind"	Crazy Love		Yes	Yes	
2009	Michael Bublé	"All I Do Is Dream of You"	Crazy Love		Yes	Yes	Yes
2009	Michael Bublé	"Heartache Tonight"	Crazy Love		Yes	Yes	Yes
2009	Michael Bublé	"At This Moment"	Crazy Love		Yes	Yes	Yes
2009	Michael Bublé and Ron Sexsmith	"Whatever It Takes"	Crazy Love		Yes	Yes	Yes
2009	Whitney Houston	"I Didn't Know My Own Strength"	I Look To You		Yes	Yes	Yes
2009	Andrea Bocelli	"White Christmas/Bianco Natale"	My Christmas		Yes	Yes	Yes
2009	Andrea Bocelli	"Angels We Have Heard On High"	My Christmas		Yes	Yes	Yes
2009	Andrea Bocelli	"Santa Claus Is Coming to Town"	My Christmas		Yes	Yes	
2009	Andrea Bocelli	"Adeste Fideles"	My Christmas		Yes	Yes	
2009	Andrea Bocelli	"O Tannenbaum"	My Christmas		Yes	Yes	Yes
2009	Andrea Bocelli	"Silent Night"	My Christmas		Yes	Yes	Yes
2009	Andrea Bocelli	"Cantique De Noel"	My Christmas		Yes	Yes	Yes
2009	Andrea Bocelli	"Caro Gesù Bambino"	My Christmas		Yes	Yes	Yes
2009	Andrea Bocelli and Natalie Cole	"The Christmas Song"	My Christmas		Yes	Yes	Yes
2009	Andrea Bocelli and The Mormon Tabernacle Choir	"The Lord's Prayer"	My Christmas		Yes	Yes	Yes
2009	Andrea Bocelli and Mary J. Blige	"What Child Is This?"	My Christmas		Yes	Yes	Yes
2009	Andrea Bocelli and The Muppets	"Jingle Bells"	My Christmas		Yes	Yes	
2009	Andrea Bocelli and Reba McEntire	"Blue Christmas"	My Christmas		Yes	Yes	Yes
2009	Andrea Bocelli and Katherine Jenkins	"I Believe"	My Christmas		Yes	Yes	Yes
2009	Lindsay Ell	"Good Mother"	Alone	Yes			

10s

Year	Artist	Song	Album	Composer	Producer	Arranger	Keyboards
2010	Charice	"In This Song"	Charice	Yes	Yes	Yes	Yes
2010	Charice	"Note to God"	Charice		Yes	Yes	Yes
2010	Seal	"If I'm Any Closer"	Seal 6: Commitment		Yes	Yes	Yes
2010	Seal	"Weight of My Mistakes"	Seal 6: Commitment		Yes	Yes	Yes
2010	Seal	"Silence"	Seal 6: Commitment		Yes	Yes	Yes
2010	Seal	"Best of Me"	Seal 6: Commitment		Yes	Yes	Yes
2010	Seal	"All for Love"	Seal 6: Commitment		Yes	Yes	Yes
2010	Seal	"I Know What You Did"	Seal 6: Commitment	Yes	Yes	Yes	Yes
2010	Seal	"The Way I Lie"	Seal 6: Commitment		Yes	Yes	Yes
2010	Seal	"Secret"	Seal 6: Commitment		Yes	Yes	Yes
2010	Seal	"You Get Me"	Seal 6: Commitment		Yes	Yes	Yes
2010	Seal	"Letting Go"	Seal 6: Commitment		Yes	Yes	Yes
2010	Seal	"Big Time"	Seal 6: Commitment		Yes	Yes	Yes
2010	Toni Braxton	"Woman"	Pulse		Yes		
2011	Jackie Evancho	"When You Wish Upon a Star"	Dream With Me		Yes	Yes	Yes
2011	Jackie Evancho	"Nella Fantasia"	Dream With Me		Yes	Yes	Yes
2011	Jackie Evancho	"Nessun Dorma"	Dream With Me		Yes	Yes	
2011	Jackie Evancho	"Angel"	Dream With Me		Yes	Yes	Yes
2011	Jackie Evancho	"O mio babbino caro"	Dream With Me		Yes	Yes	Yes
2011	Jackie Evancho	"All I Ask of You"	Dream With Me		Yes	Yes	Yes
2011	Jackie Evancho	"Ombra mai fu"	Dream With Me		Yes	Yes	Yes
2011	Jackie Evancho	"Lovers"	Dream With Me		Yes	Yes	Yes
2011	Jackie Evancho	"Imaginer"	Dream With Me		Yes	Yes	
2011	Jackie Evancho	"The Lord's Prayer"	Dream With Me		Yes	Yes	Yes
2011	Jackie Evancho	"To Believe"	Dream With Me		Yes	Yes	Yes
2011	Jackie Evancho	"Dream With Me"	Dream With Me	Yes	Yes	Yes	Yes
2011	Jackie Evancho and Susan Boyle	"A Mother's Prayer"	Dream With Me		Yes	Yes	Yes
2011	Jackie Evancho and Barbra Streisand	"Somewhere"	Dream With Me		Yes	Yes	Yes
2011	Seal	"Let's Stay Together"	Soul 2		Yes	Yes	Yes
2011	Seal	"Back Stabbers"	Soul 2		Yes	Yes	Yes
2011	Seal	"I'll Be Around"	Soul 2		Yes	Yes	Yes
2011	Seal	"Love Won't Let Me Wait"	Soul 2		Yes	Yes	Yes
2011	Tony Bennett and Jackie Evancho	"When You Wish Upon A Star"	Duets II		Yes	Yes	Yes
2011	Michael Bublé	"It's Beginning to Look a Lot Like Christmas"	Christmas		Yes	Yes	Yes
2011	Michael Bublé	"Santa Claus Is Comin' to Town"	Christmas		Yes	Yes	Yes
2011	Michael Bublé	"A Holly Jolly Christmas"	Christmas		Yes	Yes	Yes
2011	Michael Bublé	"Silent Night"	Christmas		Yes	Yes	Yes
2011	Michael Bublé	"I'll Be Home for Christmas"	Christmas		Yes	Yes	Yes
2011	Michael Bublé	"Ave Maria"	Christmas		Yes	Yes	Yes
2011	Michael Bublé and The Puppini Sisters	"Jingle Bells"	Christmas		Yes	Yes	Yes
2011	Michael Bublé and Shania Twain	"White Christmas"	Christmas		Yes	Yes	Yes
2011	Shania Twain	"Today Is Your Day"	single only		Yes		
2012	Keith Harkin	"The End Of The Innocence"	Keith Harkin		Yes		
2012	Keith Harkin	"Daisy Fields"	Keith Harkin		Yes		
2012	Keith Harkin	"Have I Told You Lately That I Love You"	Keith Harkin		Yes		
2012	Keith Harkin	"Everybody's Talkin'"	Keith Harkin		Yes		
2012	Keith Harkin	"Nothing But You & I"	Keith Harkin		Yes		
2012	Keith Harkin	"Here Comes The Sun"	Keith Harkin		Yes		
2012	Keith Harkin	"Tears Of Hercules"	Keith Harkin		Yes		
2012	Keith Harkin	"Orange Moon"	Keith Harkin		Yes		
2012	Keith Harkin	"Take It Away Boys"	Keith Harkin		Yes		
2012	Keith Harkin	"Don't Forget About Me"	Keith Harkin		Yes		
2012	Keith Harkin	"Rosa"	Keith Harkin		Yes	Yes	Yes
2012	Keith Harkin	"The Heart Of Saturday Night"	Keith Harkin		Yes		
2012	Chris Botti and Andrea Bocelli	"Per Te (For You)"	Impressions	Yes			
2012	Chris Botti and David Foster	"Summertime"	Impressions			Yes	Yes
2012	Chris Botti	"Contigo En La Distancia"	Impressions			Yes	Yes
2012	Celine Dion and Elvis Presley	"If I Can Dream"	The Best of Celine Dion & David Foster		Yes	Yes	
2012	Rod Stewart	"Have Yourself a Merry Little Christmas"	Merry Christmas, Baby		Yes	Yes	Yes
2012	Rod Stewart	"Santa Claus Is Coming to Town"	Merry Christmas, Baby		Yes	Yes	Yes
2012	Rod Stewart	"White Christmas"	Merry Christmas, Baby		Yes	Yes	
2012	Rod Stewart	"Blue Christmas"	Merry Christmas, Baby		Yes	Yes	Yes
2012	Rod Stewart	"When You Wish upon a Star"	Merry Christmas, Baby		Yes	Yes	Yes
2012	Rod Stewart	"Silent Night"	Merry Christmas, Baby		Yes	Yes	Yes
2012	Rod Stewart and Michael Bublé	"Winter Wonderland"	Merry Christmas, Baby		Yes	Yes	Yes
2012	Rod Stewart and CeeLo Green and Trombone Shorty	"Merry Christmas, Baby"	Merry Christmas, Baby		Yes	Yes	Yes
2012	Rod Stewart and Dave Koz	"Let It Snow! Let It Snow! Let It Snow!"	Merry Christmas, Baby		Yes	Yes	Yes
2012	Rod Stewart and Ella Fitzgerald and Chris Botti	"What Are You Doing New Year's Eve?"	Merry Christmas, Baby		Yes	Yes	Yes
2012	Rod Stewart and Trombone Shorty	"Red-Suited Super Man"	Merry Christmas, Baby	Yes	Yes	Yes	
2012	Rod Stewart and Mary J. Blige	"We Three Kings"	Merry Christmas, Baby		Yes	Yes	Yes
2013	Andrea Bocelli	"Perfidia"	Passione		Yes	Yes	Yes
2013	Andrea Bocelli	"Roma Nun Fa' La Stupida Stasera"	Passione		Yes	Yes	Yes
2013	Andrea Bocelli	"Champagne"	Passione		Yes	Yes	Yes
2013	Andrea Bocelli	"Anema e core"	Passione		Yes	Yes	Yes
2013	Andrea Bocelli	"Era già tutto previsto"	Passione		Yes	Yes	Yes
2013	Andrea Bocelli	"Tristeza"	Passione		Yes	Yes	Yes
2013	Andrea Bocelli	"Sara' Settembre (September Morn)"	Passione		Yes	Yes	Yes
2013	Andrea Bocelli	"Love In Portofino"	Passione		Yes	Yes	Yes
2013	Andrea Bocelli	"Garota De Ipanema"	Passione		Yes	Yes	Yes
2013	Andrea Bocelli	"Malafemmena"	Passione		Yes	Yes	Yes
2013	Andrea Bocelli	"Love Me Tender"	Passione		Yes	Yes	Yes
2013	Andrea Bocelli and Jennifer Lopez	"Quizás, Quizás, Quizás"	Passione		Yes	Yes	Yes
2013	Andrea Bocelli and Édith Piaf	"La Vie en rose"	Passione		Yes	Yes	Yes
2013	Andrea Bocelli and Nelly Furtado	"Corcovado - Quiet Nights Of Quiet Stars"	Passione		Yes	Yes	Yes
2013	Mary J. Blige	"Little Drummer Boy"	A Mary Christmas		Yes	Yes	Yes
2013	Mary J. Blige	"Have Yourself a Merry Little Christmas"	A Mary Christmas		Yes	Yes	Yes
2013	Mary J. Blige	"My Favorite Things"	A Mary Christmas		Yes	Yes	Yes
2013	Mary J. Blige	"This Christmas"	A Mary Christmas		Yes	Yes	Yes
2013	Mary J. Blige	"The Christmas Song"	A Mary Christmas		Yes	Yes	Yes
2013	Mary J. Blige	"Rudolph, The Red-Nosed Reindeer"	A Mary Christmas		Yes	Yes	
2013	Mary J. Blige	"Mary, Did You Know"	A Mary Christmas		Yes	Yes	Yes
2013	Mary J. Blige	"Petit Papa Noel"	A Mary Christmas		Yes	Yes	Yes
2013	Mary J. Blige and Barbra Streisand and Chris Botti	"When You Wish Upon a Star"	A Mary Christmas		Yes	Yes	Yes
2013	Mary J. Blige and Jessie J	"Do You Hear What I Hear?"	A Mary Christmas		Yes	Yes	Yes
2013	Mary J. Blige and The Clark Sisters	"The First Noel"	A Mary Christmas		Yes	Yes	
2013	Mary J. Blige and Marc Anthony	"Noche De Paz (Silent Night)"	A Mary Christmas		Yes	Yes	Yes
2013	Natalie Cole and Andrea Bocelli	"Bésame Mucho"	En Español		Yes	Yes	
2013	David Garrett and David Foster	"Chopin - Nocturne"	Music				Yes
2014	Bryan Adams	"Any Time at All"	Tracks Of My Years		Yes	Yes	Yes
2014	Bryan Adams	"She Knows Me"	Tracks Of My Years		Yes	Yes	Yes
2014	Bryan Adams	"I Can't Stop Loving You"	Tracks Of My Years		Yes	Yes	Yes
2014	Bryan Adams	"Lay Lady Lay"	Tracks Of My Years		Yes	Yes	
2014	Bryan Adams	"Down on the Corner"	Tracks Of My Years		Yes	Yes	Yes
2014	Bryan Adams	"Never My Love"	Tracks Of My Years		Yes	Yes	Yes
2014	Bryan Adams	"Sunny"	Tracks Of My Years		Yes	Yes	Yes
2014	Bryan Adams	"The Tracks of My Tears"	Tracks Of My Years		Yes	Yes	Yes
2014	Bryan Adams	"God Only Knows"	Tracks Of My Years		Yes	Yes	Yes
2014	Ruben Studdard	"I Can't Make You Love Me"	Unconditional Love		Yes	Yes	Yes
2014	Ruben Studdard	"Hello Again"	Unconditional Love		Yes	Yes	Yes
2014	Ruben Studdard	"They Long To Be (Close To You)"	Unconditional Love		Yes	Yes	Yes
2014	Ruben Studdard	"Meant to Be"	Unconditional Love	Yes	Yes	Yes	
2014	Mina and Seal	"You Get Me"	Caramella		Yes		
2015	Brenna Whitaker	"Black And Gold"	Brenna Whitaker		Yes	Yes	Yes
2015	Brenna Whitaker	"Misty Blue"	Brenna Whitaker		Yes	Yes	Yes
2015	Brenna Whitaker	"It's A Good Day"	Brenna Whitaker		Yes	Yes	Yes
2015	Brenna Whitaker	"You Don't Own Me"	Brenna Whitaker		Yes	Yes	Yes
2015	Brenna Whitaker	"My Heart Cries For You"	Brenna Whitaker		Yes	Yes	
2015	Brenna Whitaker	"When I'm Gone"	Brenna Whitaker	Yes	Yes	Yes	Yes
2015	Brenna Whitaker	"I Can't Hear A Word You Say"	Brenna Whitaker		Yes	Yes	
2015	Brenna Whitaker	"It's Not Easy Bein' Green"	Brenna Whitaker		Yes	Yes	
2015	Brenna Whitaker	"Anyone Who Had A Heart"	Brenna Whitaker		Yes	Yes	Yes
2015	Brenna Whitaker	"A House Is Not A Home"	Brenna Whitaker		Yes	Yes	Yes
2015	Ne-Yo	"Friend Like Me" (from Aladdin)	We Love Disney		Yes	Yes	Yes
2015	Jessie J	"Part of Your World" (from The Little Mermaid)	We Love Disney		Yes	Yes	
2015	Jason Derulo	"Can You Feel the Love Tonight/Nants Ingonyama" (from The Lion King)	We Love Disney		Yes	Yes	Yes
2015	Gwen Stefani	"Rainbow Connection" (from The Muppet Movie)	We Love Disney		Yes	Yes	Yes
2015	Ariana Grande	"Zero to Hero" (from Hercules)	We Love Disney		Yes	Yes	
2015	Jhené Aiko	"In a World of My Own / Very Good Advice" (from Alice in Wonderland)	We Love Disney		Yes	Yes	
2015	Tori Kelly	"Colors of the Wind" (from Pocahontas)	We Love Disney		Yes	Yes	Yes
2015	Charles Perry	"Ev'rybody Wants to Be a Cat" (from The Aristocats)	We Love Disney		Yes	Yes	Yes
2015	Jessie Ware	"A Dream Is a Wish Your Heart Makes" (from Cinderella )	We Love Disney		Yes	Yes	Yes
2015	Rascal Flatts & Lucy Hale	"Let It Go" (from Frozen)	We Love Disney		Yes	Yes	
2015	We Love Disney Artists	"It's a Small World"	We Love Disney		Yes	Yes	Yes
2015	Andrea Bocelli	"Maria" (from West Side Story)	Cinema		Yes		
2015	Andrea Bocelli	"La chanson de Lara" (from Doctor Zhivago)	Cinema		Yes		Yes
2015	Andrea Bocelli	"Moon River" (from Breakfast at Tiffany's)	Cinema		Yes	Yes	Yes
2015	Andrea Bocelli	"Be My Love" (from The Toast of New Orleans)	Cinema		Yes		
2015	Andrea Bocelli	"The Music of the Night" (from The Phantom of the Opera)	Cinema		Yes		
2015	Andrea Bocelli	"Por una cabeza" (from Scent of a Woman)	Cinema		Yes		Yes
2015	Andrea Bocelli	"Sorridi amore vai" (from Life Is Beautiful)	Cinema		Yes		
2015	Andrea Bocelli	"Mi mancherai" (from Il Postino)	Cinema		Yes		Yes
2015	Andrea Bocelli	"Brucia la Terra" (from The Godfather)	Cinema		Yes	Yes	Yes
2015	Andrea Bocelli	"Nelle tue mani (Now We Are Free)" (from Gladiator)	Cinema		Yes		Yes
2015	Andrea Bocelli and Ariana Grande	"E più ti penso" (from Once Upon a Time in America and Malèna)	Cinema		Yes		Yes
2015	Andrea Bocelli and Veronica Berti	"Cheek to Cheek" (from Top Hat)	Cinema		Yes	Yes	Yes
2015	Diana Krall	"California Dreamin'"	Wallflower		Yes	Yes	Yes
2015	Diana Krall	"Desperado"	Wallflower		Yes	Yes	Yes
2015	Diana Krall	"Superstar"	Wallflower		Yes	Yes	Yes
2015	Diana Krall	"If I Take You Home Tonight"	Wallflower		Yes	Yes	Yes
2015	Diana Krall	"I Can't Tell You Why"	Wallflower		Yes	Yes	
2015	Diana Krall	"Sorry Seems to Be the Hardest Word"	Wallflower		Yes	Yes	Yes
2015	Diana Krall	"Operator (That's Not the Way It Feels)"	Wallflower		Yes	Yes	Yes
2015	Diana Krall	"I'm Not in Love"	Wallflower		Yes	Yes	Yes
2015	Diana Krall	"Don't Dream It's Over"	Wallflower		Yes	Yes	Yes
2015	Diana Krall and Michael Bublé	"Alone Again (Naturally)"	Wallflower		Yes	Yes	Yes
2015	Diana Krall and Blake Mills	"Wallflower"	Wallflower		Yes	Yes	
2015	Diana Krall and Bryan Adams	"Feels Like Home"	Wallflower		Yes	Yes	Yes
2015	Van Ness Wu and Melanie C and Anggun Cipta Sasmi	"Let's Groove"	unreleased			Yes	
2016	Jordan Smith	"Over the Rainbow"	Something Beautiful		Yes	Yes	Yes
2016	Jordan Smith	"You Are So Beautiful"	Something Beautiful		Yes	Yes	Yes
2016	Jordan Smith	"Angel"	Something Beautiful		Yes	Yes	
2016	Jordan Smith	"Amazing Grace"	Something Beautiful		Yes	Yes	Yes
2016	Jordan Smith	"Have Yourself A Merry Little Christmas"	'Tis The Season		Yes	Yes	Yes
2016	Jordan Smith	"It Came Upon A Midnight Clear"	'Tis The Season		Yes	Yes	Yes
2016	Jordan Smith	"My Grown-Up Christmas List"	'Tis The Season	Yes	Yes	Yes	Yes
2016	Jordan Smith	"You’re A Mean One, Mr. Grinch"	'Tis The Season		Yes	Yes	
2016	Jordan Smith	"Silent Night"	'Tis The Season		Yes	Yes	Yes
2016	Jordan Smith	"What Child Is This?"	'Tis The Season		Yes	Yes	Yes
2016	Jordan Smith	"I’ll Be Home For Christmas"	'Tis The Season		Yes	Yes	
2016	Jordan Smith	"Santa Claus Is Coming To Town"	'Tis The Season		Yes	Yes	
2016	Jordan Smith	"Rockin’ Around The Christmas Tree"	'Tis The Season		Yes	Yes	
2016	Jordan Smith	"The Christmas Song"	'Tis The Season		Yes	Yes	Yes
2016	Jordan Smith and The Mormon Tabernacle Choir	"O Holy Night"	'Tis The Season		Yes	Yes	Yes
2016	Jordan Smith and Maria Aleida	"Ave Maria"	'Tis The Season		Yes	Yes	Yes
2016	Yuna	"All I Do"	Chapters	Yes	Yes	Yes	Yes
2017	Carla Bruni	"Enjoy the Silence"	French Touch		Yes	Yes	
2017	Carla Bruni	"Jimmy Jazz"	French Touch		Yes	Yes	
2017	Carla Bruni	"Love Letters"	French Touch		Yes	Yes	Yes
2017	Carla Bruni	"Miss You"	French Touch		Yes	Yes	
2017	Carla Bruni	"The Winner Takes It All"	French Touch		Yes	Yes	Yes
2017	Carla Bruni	"Highway to Hell"	French Touch		Yes	Yes	
2017	Carla Bruni	"Perfect Day"	French Touch		Yes	Yes	
2017	Carla Bruni	"Stand by Your Man"	French Touch		Yes	Yes	
2017	Carla Bruni	"Please Don't Kiss Me"	French Touch		Yes	Yes	
2017	Carla Bruni	"Moon River"	French Touch		Yes	Yes	Yes
2017	Carla Bruni and Willie Nelson	"Crazy"	French Touch		Yes	Yes	Yes
2018	Michael Bublé	"When I Fall in Love"	Love		Yes	Yes	Yes
2018	Michael Bublé	"I Only Have Eyes for You"	Love		Yes	Yes	
2018	Michael Bublé	"Love You Anymore"	Love		Yes	Yes	Yes
2018	Michael Bublé	"My Funny Valentine"	Love		Yes	Yes	Yes
2018	Michael Bublé	"Such a Night"	Love		Yes		
2018	Michael Bublé	"Forever Now"	Love		Yes	Yes	
2018	Michael Bublé	"Unforgettable"	Love		Yes	Yes	
2018	Michael Bublé	"When You're Smiling"	Love		Yes	Yes	
2018	Michael Bublé	"Where or When"	Love		Yes	Yes	Yes
2018	Michael Bublé and Cécile McLorin Salvant	"La Vie en rose"	Love		Yes	Yes	Yes
2018	Michael Bublé and Loren Allred	"Help Me Make It Through the Night"	Love		Yes	Yes	Yes
2018	Jessie J	"Santa Claus Is Comin' to Town"	This Christmas Day		Yes	Yes	
2018	Jessie J	"Silent Night"	This Christmas Day		Yes	Yes	Yes
2018	Disturbed	"Uninvited Guest"	Evolution		Yes	Yes	
2018	Barbra Streisand	"Better Angels"	Walls		Yes	Yes	

20s

Year	Artist	Song	Album	Composer	Producer	Arranger	Keyboards
2022	Bryan Adams	"On A Night Like Tonight"	Pretty Woman - The Musical				Yes

Details unknown

Year	Album	Artist	Producer	Arranger	Keyboards
1971	High Grass	Crosstown Bus		Yes	
1974	The Rocky Horror Show: Original Soundtrack	Various Artists			Yes
1974	Waiting For A Song	Denny Doherty			Yes
1975	Lazy Afternoon	Barbra Streisand			Yes
1975	John R.Cash	Johnny Cash			Yes
1975	Kim Carnes	Kim Carnes			Yes
1975	Cate Bros.	Cate Brothers			Yes
1975	Rude Awakening	Bruce Miller		Yes	Yes
1975	The Hungry Years a.k.a. Overnight Success	Neil Sedaka			Yes
1975	The Dream Weaver	Gary Wright			Yes
1975	In My Own Way	Michael Bruce			Yes
1975	Burnin' Thing	Mac Davis			Yes
1975	I	Guthrie Thomas			Yes
1975	Hard To Be Friends	The Cats			Yes
1975	Living Together	Fire and Rain			Yes
1975	Life Is Short, But It's Wide	Maxine Sellers			Yes
1975	Duce Of Hearts	Chris Ducey			Yes
1975	Paradise / Don't Let It Mess Your Mind	Ted Neeley			Yes
1976	A Night on the Town	Rod Stewart			Yes
1976	Slow Down World	Donovan		Yes	Yes
1976	A Circle Filled With Love	The Sons of Champlin		Yes	Yes
1976	Lisa Hartman	Lisa Hartman			Yes
1976	Time Is On My Side	Tracy Nelson			Yes
1976	Tom Thumb The Dreamer	Michael Dinner			Yes
1976	Pictures and Rhymes	Jim Weatherly			Yes
1976	Motion	Geoff Muldaur			Yes
1976	Classical Country	Snuff Garrett's Texas Opera Company			Yes
1977	Here You Come Again	Dolly Parton			Yes
1977	The Music Man	Paul Anka			Yes
1977	Superman	Barbra Streisand			Yes
1977	The Light Of Smiles	Gary Wright			Yes
1977	Mr. Lucky	Fools Gold		Yes	Yes
1977	Introducing Sparks	Sparks			Yes
1977	Bruce Roberts	Bruce Roberts			Yes
1977	Southern Nights	Glen Campbell			Yes
1977	Together	O.C.Smith			Yes
1977	The Original Disco Duck	Rick Dees & His Cast Of Idiots			Yes
1977	First In Line	Randy Sharp			Yes
1977	Figli Delle Stelle	Alan Sorrenti			Yes
1977	5･4･3･2･1･0	Flying Kitty Band			Yes
1977	Rock'n Rose	Alain Chamfort			Yes
1978	Heartbreaker	Dolly Parton			Yes
1978	The Wiz: Original Soundtrack	Various Artists			Yes
1978	Miss Gladys Knight	Gladys Knight			Yes
1978	Miracles	The Miracles			Yes
1978	At The Third Stroke	Russ Ballard			Yes
1978	Thistles	Bim			Yes
1978	The 1st Cuba Gooding Album	Cuba Gooding			Yes
1978	The Truth About Us	The Hudson Brothers			Yes
1978	Feitiço	Ney Matogrosso			Yes
1978	Your Place Or Mine	The Hues Corporation			Yes
1978	Mannequin	Marc Jordan			Yes
1978	Flower	Flower			Yes
1978	Who Is She...	Madelaine			Yes
1979	Part Of The Game	Pablo Cruise			Yes
1979	Thanks I'll Eat It Here	Lowell George			Yes
1980	He Who Rides the Tiger	Bernie Taupin			Yes
1981	Hot Baby	Ami Ozaki		Yes	Yes
1981	Air Kiss	Ami Ozaki		Yes	Yes
1981	Claudia	Claudia			Yes
1981	U•S•J	Char			Yes
1982	Dreamgirls: Original Broadway Cast Album	Various Artists	Yes		
1982	I'm Your Girl Friend	Dara Sedaka	Yes	Yes	Yes
1982	Dreamwalkin'	Eric Tagg			Yes
1983	Rock Rolls On	Michael Bruce			Yes
1983	Cool Hand	Anne Bertucci			Yes
1984	1100 Bel Air Place	Julio Iglesias			Yes
1984	Once Upon a Christmas	Kenny Rogers and Dolly Parton	Yes	Yes	Yes
1984	Lilás	Djavan	Yes	Yes	Yes
1984	I Won't Break Your Heart	Hiromi Iwasaki			Yes
1994	A Very Reggae Christmas	Kofi	Yes		
1994	Permiso De Volar	Alejandro Lerner			Yes
1997	EVE: Original Soundtrack	David Foster	Yes	Yes	Yes
1998	Civil War: The Nashville Sessions	Various Artists		Yes	Yes
1999	One Shade Of Love	Martin	Yes	Yes	
2001	Celtic Crossroads - The Uncharted Path	Doug Cameron	Yes	Yes	Yes
2001	La Taberna Del Buda	Café Quijano			Yes
2003	Teko's Theme	David Foster and Nita Whitaker	Yes	Yes	Yes
2004	Audrey	Audrey De Montigny	Yes		
2004	¡Qué Grande Es Esto Del Amor!	Café Quijano			Yes
2008	David Cavazos	David Cavazos		Yes	Yes
2013	Cody Karey	Cody Karey	Yes		
2022	Higher	Michael Bublé		Yes	Yes
