= Collection (Lee Ritenour album) =

Compilation album by Lee Ritenour
- Released: 1991
- Recorded: various locations 1979-1991
- Genre: Jazz
- Length: 66:54
- Label: GRP
- Producer: Lee Ritenour; Toshi Endo; David Foster; Dave Grusin; Harvey Mason; Don Murray

Lee Ritenour chronology
| Stolen Moments (1990) | Collection (1991) | Wes Bound (1991) |

Professional ratings
Review scores
| Source | Rating |
|---|---|
| AllMusic | 3/5 stars |

Collection is an album by American guitarist Lee Ritenour released in 1991, recorded for the GRP label. Collection contains a retrospective of Ritenour's 1979-1991 work. The album reached #7 on Billboard's Contemporary Jazz chart.

== Track listing ==
All tracks are written by Lee Ritenour, unless otherwise noted.

| No. | Title | Writer(s) | Original Album | Length |
|---|---|---|---|---|
| 1. | "Early A.M. Attitude" | Dave Grusin | Harlequin with Dave Grusin (1985) | 4:59 |
| 2. | "Rio Funk" | | Rio (1979) | 5:08 |
| 3. | "Night Rhythms" | | Festival (1988) | 4:32 |
| 4. | "White Water" | Russell Ferrante; Jay Beckenstein | Portrait (1987) | 5:02 |
| 5. | "San Ysidro" | Djavan Caetano Viana | Harlequin | 4:59 |
| 6. | "Asa" | | Portrait | 5:22 |
| 7. | "Dolphin Dreams" | | On the Line (1983) | 5:09 |
| 8. | "Is It You?" | Lee Ritenour; Bill Champlin; Eric Tagg | Rit (1981) | 4:25 |
| 9. | "24th Street Blues" | | Stolen Moments (1990) | 5:24 |
| 10. | "Latin Lovers" | Aldir Blanc; João Bosco | Festival | 6:17 |
| 11. | "The Sauce" | Greg Mathieson | Earth Run (1986) | 4:23 |
| 12. | "Malibu" | Lee Ritenour; Phil Perry | Color Rit (1989) | 4:47 |
| 13. | "Waltz for Carmen" | Lee Ritenour; Mitch Holder | Stolen Moments | 6:23 |
| Total length: | | | | 66:54 |

== Personnel ==
- Lee Ritenour – guitars (1, 5, 7), arrangements (1, 5, 7, 11), acoustic guitar (2–4, 10, 12), rhythm arrangements (2, 3, 8, 10, 12), electric guitar (4, 9, 11, 13), acoustic guitar synthesizer (4), lead guitar (6), horn and string arrangements (8), electric classical guitar (11)
- Dave Grusin – acoustic piano (1, 5), keyboards (1–3, 5, 10), arrangements (1, 5), string arrangements (2)
- Randy Goodrum – MIDI piano programming (1, 5)
- Marcus Ryle – additional synthesizer programming (1, 5)
- Robbie Kondor – synthesizer programming (3, 10)
- Russell Ferrante – keyboards (4)
- Barnaby Finch – MIDI piano (6)
- David Boruff – synthesizer programming (6)
- Greg Mathieson – keyboards (7, 11), synth bass (11), arrangements (11)
- David Foster – keyboards (8)
- Richard Tee – keyboards (8)
- Alan Broadbent – acoustic piano (9, 13)
- Casey Young – synthesizer programming (11)
- David Witham – MIDI piano (12)
- Jeff Mironov – rhythm guitar (2)
- Djavan – rhythm guitar (6), vocals (6)
- Joao Bosco – acoustic guitar (10), lead vocals (10)
- Mitch Holder – acoustic guitar (13)
- Jimmy Johnson – bass (1, 5, 12)
- Marcus Miller – bass (2, 3)
- Jimmy Haslip – bass (4)
- Tim Landers – bass (6)
- Nathan East – electric bass (7), synth bass (7)
- Abraham Laboriel – bass (8)
- John Pattitucci – acoustic bass (9, 13)
- Anthony Jackson – 6-string bass (10)
- Carlos Vega – drums (1, 5, 11, 12)
- Don Grusin – electronic drum programming (1, 5)
- Harvey Mason – electronic drum programming (1, 5), drums (7, 9, 13), Linn LM-1 programming (8), percussion (8); rhythm, horn and string arrangements (8)
- Buddy Williams – drums (2)
- Omar Hakim – drums (3, 10)
- Will Kennedy – drums (4)
- Vinnie Colaiuta – drums (6)
- Paulinho da Costa – percussion (1, 3, 5, 6, 10–12)
- Rubens Bassini – percussion (2)
- Carlinhos Brown – pandeiro (3), djembe (10)
- Alex Acuña – percussion (4), drums (8)
- Lenny Castro – percussion (7)
- Larry Williams – horns (2), synthesizers (6, 12), tenor saxophone (6), synthesizer programming (11)
- Ernie Watts – tenor saxophone (3, 9, 13), synthesizer sax (7)
- Gary Grant – horns (2)
- Jerry Hey – horns (2), horn arrangements (2, 6, 8), trumpet (6, 8), synthesizer arrangements (6), string arrangements (8)
- Randy Kerber – horns and strings (10)
- Johnny Mandel – horn and string arrangements (10)
- Bill Champlin – vocals (8)
- Eric Tagg – vocals (8)
- Gracinha Leporace – backing vocals (10)
- Phil Perry – lead vocals (12)

=== Production ===
- Larry Rosen – executive producer
- Dave Grusin – executive producer, producer (1, 5)
- Lee Ritenour – producer
- Toshi Endo – co-producer (2, 7)
- Don Murray – co-producer (3, 4, 6, 10, 12)
- David Foster – producer (8)
- Harvey Mason – producer (8)
- Greg Mathieson – producer (11)
- Joseph Doughney – digital editing, post-production
- Michael Landy – digital editing, post-production
- Ted Jensen – mastering at Stering Sound (New York, NY)
- Michelle Lewis – GRP production coordinator
- Andy Baltimore – creative director
- David Gibb – design
- Scott Johnson – design
- Sonny Mediana – design
- Andy Ruggirello – design
- Dan Serrano – design
- Susan Stilton – logo design
- Chuck Berg – liner notes

Track information and credits adapted the album's liner notes.

== Charts ==
| Chart (1991) | Peak position |
|---|---|
| US Top Contemporary Jazz Albums (Billboard) | 7 |
