= The Captain's Journey =

Studio album by Lee Ritenour
- Released: 1978
- Studios: Sound Labs and Conway (Hollywood, California); Studio 55 (Los Angeles, California); Electric Lady (New York City, New York)
- Genres: Jazz fusion, smooth jazz
- Length: 38:35
- Label: Elektra
- Producers: Lee Ritenour; Dave Grusin

Lee Ritenour chronology
Friendship (1978)	The Captain's Journey (1978)	Rio (1979)

The Captain's Journey is the sixth studio album by guitarist Lee Ritenour, released in 1978 by Elektra Records.

== Critical reception ==
Professional ratings
Review scores
Source	Rating
AllMusic	2.5/5 stars

The Press of Atlantic City noted that "it is Grusin's material that saves the album from sheer boredom."

== Track listing ==
All tracks are written by Lee Ritenour except where noted.

No.	Title	Length
1.	"The Captain's Journey: Part I: The Calm; Part II: The Storm"	8:03
2.	"Morning Glory" (lyrics: Bill Champlin)	5:53
3.	"Sugarloaf Express"	5:06
4.	"Matchmakers"	4:53
5.	"What Do You Want?" (Don Grusin)	5:27
6.	"That's Enough for Me" (lyrics: Patti Austin, music: Dave Grusin)	5:24
7.	"Etude" (Dave Grusin)	3:49
Total length:		38:35

== Personnel ==
- Lee Ritenour – electric guitar (1–6), acoustic 12-string guitar (1, 3, 7), 360 Systems guitar synthesizer (1, 5), rhythm arrangements (1, 3–7), classical guitars (7)
- Dave Grusin – Oberheim Polyphonic Synthesizer (1, 3), Minimoog (1.2, 3, 5), rhythm arrangements (1, 3–7), string arrangements and conductor (1, 2, 4, 6, 7), Fender Rhodes (2, 7), acoustic piano (3, 4, 7), Yamaha electric grand piano (5, 6), percussion (6, 7), flute arrangements and conductor (7)
- Patrice Rushen – Fender Rhodes (1.1), Yamaha electric grand piano (1.1)
- Ian Underwood – Oberheim Polyphonic synthesizer (1.2)
- Ed Walsh – synthesizer programming (1.2, 3)
- David Foster – acoustic piano (2), rhythm arrangements (2), Fender Rhodes (4)
- Don Grusin – acoustic piano (5)
- Jay Graydon – rhythm guitar (2, 4)
- Mitch Holder – rhythm guitar (3, 6)
- Anthony Jackson – bass (1.1)
- Abraham Laboriel – bass
- Steve Gadd – drums (1, 2, 4–7)
- Steve Forman – percussion (1, 3)
- Alex Acuña – percussion (1.2, 3), drums (3)
- Paulinho da Costa – percussion (3, 5, 6)
- Sue Evans – percussion (4–7)
- Steve Thornton – percussion (4)
- Larry Rosen – percussion (7)
- David Nadien – strings (1, 2, 4, 6, 7)
- Ernie Watts – tenor sax solo (4), soprano saxophone (5)
- Ray Beckenstein – flute (7)
- Eddie Daniels – flute (7)
- Dave Valentin – flute (7)
- Bill Champlin – lead vocals (2), vocal arrangements (2)
- Venette Gloud – backing vocals (2)
- Carmen Twillie – backing vocals (2)
- Patti Austin – vocals (6)
- Tom Baylor – vocals (6)

=== Production ===
- Lee Ritenour – producer
- Dave Grusin – producer
- Peter Chaiken – recording
- Don Murray – recording
- Larry Rosen – recording
- Howard Steele – recording
- Tommy Vicari – recording
- Dennis Digher – assistant engineer
- Neil Dorfsman – assistant engineer
- Chris Gordon – assistant engineer
- Linda Tyler – assistant engineer
- Bernie Grundman – original mastering at A&M Studios (Hollywood, California)
- Joe Gastwirt – CD mastering at Ocean View Digital Mastering (Los Angeles, California)
- Bruce Steinberg – album design, photography
- Donalyn Catalano – CD design
