= Harlequin (Dave Grusin and Lee Ritenour album) =

Studio album by Dave Grusin and Lee Ritenour
- Released: 1985
- Recorded: 1985
- Studios: Starlight Studio (Burbank California); Capitol Studios and Sunset Sound (Hollywood, California)
- Genre: Jazz
- Length: 46:38
- Label: GRP
- Producers: Dave Grusin; Lee Ritenour

Dave Grusin chronology
Night-Lines (1984)	Harlequin (1985)	Cinemagic (1987)

Lee Ritenour chronology
Banded Together (1984)	Harlequin (1984)	Earth Run (1986)

Harlequin is a collaborative studio album by American pianist Dave Grusin and American guitarist Lee Ritenour, released in 1985 through GRP Records. The album reached No. 2 on Billboard's Contemporary Jazz chart, and earned a 1986 Grammy Award for Best Arrangement on an Instrumental for "Early A.M. Attitude". Harlequin also earned Grammy nominations for Best Engineered Recording, Best Instrumental Arrangement Accompanying Vocals, and Best Pop Instrumental Performance. In 1988, Perri sisters sampled Grusin's “The Bird” into their track called “The Flight”, from their album “The Flight” under Zebra Records, that song was produced by Michael J. Powell.

== Track listing ==
No.	Title	Length
1.	"Harlequin" (Ivan Lins, Vítor Martins)	4:40
2.	"Early A.M. Attitude" (Dave Grusin)	4:58
3.	"San Ysidro" (Lee Ritenour)	4:57
4.	"Before It's Too Late" (Lins, Martins)	5:16
5.	"Silent Message" (Dave Grusin)	6:07
6.	"Cats of Rio" (Don Grusin)	5:15
7.	"Beyond the Storm" (Lins, Martins)	5:36
8.	"Grid-Lock" (Ritenour)	4:02
9.	"The Bird" (Harvey Mason, Mike Lang)	5:47

== Personnel ==
- Dave Grusin – acoustic piano, keyboards
- Randy Goodrum – MIDI piano programming
- Marcus Ryle – additional synthesizer programming
- Lee Ritenour – guitars
- Jimmy Johnson – bass (1–5, 7, 8)
- Abraham Laboriel – bass (6, 9)
- Don Grusin – electronic drum programming
- Carlos Vega – drums (1–5, 7, 8)
- Harvey Mason – drums (6, 9), electronic drum programming
- Paulinho da Costa – percussion
- Alex Acuña – percussion (1, 7, 9)
- Ivan Lins – vocals (1, 4, 7)
- Carol Rogers – backing vocals (1, 4)
- Marietta Waters – backing vocals (1, 4)
- Regina Werneck – backing vocals (1, 4)

=== Production ===
- Larry Rosen – executive producer
- Dave Grusin – executive producer, producer, arrangements
- Lee Ritenour – producer, arrangements
- Don Murray – recording, mixing
- Terry Bower – additional recording, recording assistant, mix assistant
- Terry Christian – recording assistant, mix assistant
- David Cole – recording assistant, mix assistant
- Josiah Gluck – additional recording
- David Leonard – additional recording
- Randy Goodrum – MIDI piano recording at Randy Goodrum Studio (North Hollywood, California)
- Joe Gastwirt – digital editing at JVC (Hollywood, California)
- Wally Traugott – mastering at Capitol Mastering (Hollywood, California)
- Peter Lopez – production coordinator
- Andy Baltimore – creative direction, album design
- Dario Campanile – cover design, album design
- Dan Serrano – album design
- Ron Slenzak – photography

== Charts ==
Chart (1985)	Peak position
US Jazz Albums (Billboard)	2
