= Color Rit =

Studio album by Lee Ritenour
- Released: 1989
- Recorded: 1989
- Studios: A&M Studios (Hollywood, California) Starlight Studios (Malibu, California) Smoketree Ranch (Chatsworth, California)
- Genre: Jazz
- Length: 43:28
- Label: GRP
- Producer: Lee Ritenour

Lee Ritenour chronology
Festival (1988)	Color Rit (1989)	Stolen Moments (1990)

Professional ratings
Review scores
Source	Rating
AllMusic	3/5 stars

Color Rit is an album by American jazz guitarist Lee Ritenour that was released in 1989 by GRP Records. The album reached No. 4 on the Billboard magazine Contemporary Jazz chart.

== Track listing ==
All tracks are written by Lee Ritenour except where noted.

No.	Title	Writer(s)	Length
1.	"Bahia Funk"		4:50
2.	"É"	Gonzaguinha	4:41
3.	"All The Same Tonight"	Ivan Lins, Vítor Martins, Eric Tagg	4:37
4.	"Mister Reggae"		4:06
5.	"Etude"		3:06
6.	"I Can't Let Go"	The Isley Brothers	4:15
7.	"Color Rit"		4:56
8.	"The Kiss"		3:59
9.	"Malibu"	Ritenour, Phil Perry	4:47
10.	"Tropical Storm"		3:59

== Personnel ==
- Lee Ritenour – rhythm arrangements, acoustic guitar, electric guitars (4, 6, 8)
- Larry Williams – keyboards (1, 4, 5, 7, 8), flute (2), saxophones (4), synthesizers (9)
- David Witham – keyboards (1, 3), keyboard solo (1), MIDI piano (2–4, 9), synthesizers (5, 7, 8), acoustic piano (6)
- Russell Ferrante – keyboards (2), synthesizers (3, 6)
- Oscar Castro-Neves – acoustic rhythm guitar (2)
- Jimmy Johnson – bass (1–10, except 5)
- Anthony Jackson – contrabass guitar (5)
- Carlos Vega – drums (1–9)
- Bob Wilson – drums (10)
- Paulinho da Costa – percussion (1–9)
- Ernie Watts – tenor saxophone (1), alto saxophone (7)
- Jerry Hey – horn and string arrangements, trumpet (2, 4)
- Jota Moraes – rhythm arrangements (2)
- Johnny Mandel – string arrangements (8)
- Gonzaguinha – lead vocals (2)
- Gracinha Leporace – backing vocals (2, 3)
- Kate Markowitz – backing vocals (2, 3)
- Phil Perry – lead vocals (3, 6, 9), backing vocals (3, 9)

=== Production ===
- Dave Grusin – executive producer
- Larry Rosen – executive producer
- Lee Ritenour – producer
- Don Murray – co-producer, engineer, mixing, recording
- Kevin Dixon – mix assistant
- Andrew Madlener – mix assistant
- Tom Banghart – additional mix assistant
- Terry Bower – additional mix assistant
- Zero Nylin – additional mix assistant
- Bob Salcedo – additional mix assistant
- Wally Traugott – mastering at Capitol Studios (Hollywood, California)
- CMS Digital (Pasadena, California) – digital editing location
- Suzanne Sherman – production coordinator
- Andy Baltimore – creative direction, graphic design
- Lee Corey – graphic design
- David Gibb – graphic design
- Andy Ruggirello – graphic design
- Dan Serrano – graphic design
- Vincente Kutka – front cover art
- Susan Silton – title design
- Chris Cuffaro – back cover photography, black and white photography

Track information and credits adapted from Discogs and AllMusic, then verified from the album's liner notes.

== Charts ==
Chart (1990)	Peak position
Billboard Jazz Albums	4
