= Rio (Lee Ritenour album) =

Studio album by Lee Ritenour
- Released: 1979
- Recorded: August – October 1979
- Studios: Sigla (Rio de Janeiro, Brazil); Santa Barbara Sound Design (Santa Barbara, California); Davlen Sound (North Hollywood, California); A&R (New York City, New York)
- Genres: Jazz, jazz fusion
- Length: 40:05
- Labels: JVC, Elektra/Musician, GRP
- Producer: Toshio Endo

Lee Ritenour chronology
Friendship (1978)	Rio (1979)	Feel the Night (1979)

1982 Elektra/Musician cover

Rio is an album by jazz guitarist Lee Ritenour, recorded in New York City, Santa Barbara, and Rio de Janeiro, originally titled Lee Ritenour in Rio. It was released in 1979 in Japan on JVC Records, then in 1982 in the U.S. on Elektra/Musician Records, then on GRP in 1985 with a different album cover and track sequence.

== Critical reception ==
Professional ratings
Review scores
Source	Rating
AllMusic	4/5 stars
The Rolling Stone Album Guide	3/5 stars

The Boston Globe wrote: "The sound is glorious. Each instrument is perfectly defined; the drums are crisp; the bells are like crystal."

== Track listing ==
All titles composed by Lee Ritenour except where noted

1. "Rio Funk" – 5:10
2. "San Juan Sunset" (Eumir Deodato) – 5:37
3. "Rainbow" (Don Grusin) – 5:48
4. "A Little Bit of This and a Little Bit of That" – 5:09
5. "Simplicidad" – 4:58
6. "Ipanema Sol" – 5:28
7. "It Happens Every Day" (Joe Sample) – 5:43

== Personnel ==
Musicians

- Lee Ritenour – acoustic guitar
- Dave Grusin – keyboards (1–2, 4)
- Jeff Mironov – rhythm guitar (1–2, 4)
- Marcus Miller – bass (1–2, 4)
- Buddy Williams – drums (1–2, 4)
- Rubens Bassini – percussion (1–2, 4)
- Don Grusin – keyboards (3, 5–7)
- Oscar Castro-Neves – rhythm guitar (3, 5)
- Luizão Maia – bass (3, 5)
- Paulinho Braga – drums (3, 5)
- Chico Batera – percussion (3, 5)
- Jose Da Silva – percussion (3, 5)
- Armando Marçal – percussion (3, 5)
- Roberto Pinheiro – percussion (3, 5)
- Abraham Laboriel – bass (6–7)
- Alex Acuña – drums (6–7)
- Steve Forman – percussion (6–7)
- Ernie Watts – soprano saxophone (6–7), flute (6–7)

Music arrangements

- Lee Ritenour – rhythm arrangements, arrangements (2)
- Dave Grusin – string arrangements
- Jerry Hey – horn arrangements
- Don Grusin – arrangements (2)

Production

- Toshio Endo – producer
- Lee Ritenour – co-producer
- Don Murray – recording, mixing
- Larry Rosen – recording, mixing
- Ron Coro – art direction
- Denise Minobe – art direction
- Aaron Rapoport – front cover photography
- L. Villoya – back cover photography

== 1985 release listing ==
1. "Rainbow"
2. "San Juan Sunset"
3. "Rio Funk"
4. "It Happens Everyday"
5. "Ipanema Sol"
6. "Simplicidad"
7. "A Little Bit of This and a Little Bit of That"

GRP reissue credits

- Peter Lopez – production coordinator
- Andy Baltimore – creative director
- Reilcichi Nakayama – art design
- Chu Kawahito – photography
- The Mastering Lab and A&M Studios (Hollywood, California) – mastering locations

== Chart performance ==
Year	Chart	Position
1982	Billboard Jazz Albums	11
1982	Billboard Pop Albums	163
