= Earth Run =

Studio album by Lee Ritenour
- Released: April 1986
- Studio: Starlight (Burbank, California)
- Genre: Jazz fusion, smooth jazz
- Length: 44:28
- Label: GRP
- Producer: Lee Ritenour; Greg Mathieson; Dave Grusin; Larry Rosen

Lee Ritenour chronology
Harlequin (1985)	Earth Run (1986)	Portrait (1987)

Earth Run is the fifteenth studio album by jazz guitarist Lee Ritenour, released in April 1986 through GRP Records. The album reached number ten on the Billboard Jazz Albums chart in the United States and received a Grammy Award nomination for Grammy Award for Best Jazz Fusion Performance, Vocal or Instrumental. The title track was also nominated for Best Instrumental Composition.

== Critical reception ==
Professional ratings
Review scores
Source	Rating
AllMusic	2.5/5 stars

Richard S. Ginell at AllMusic called the album "a more interesting record than most of its immediate predecessors" and noted the "peculiarly fuzzy, futuristic sound" of Ritenour's SynthAxe guitar synthesizer (as depicted on the cover art; one of nine different guitars used on the album). He also listed "The Sauce" and the cover of Herbie Hancock's "Butterfly" as highlights.

== Track listing ==
No.	Title	Writer(s)	Length
1.	"Soaring"	Lee Ritenour	5:38
2.	"Earth Run"	Ritenour, Dave Grusin	4:39
3.	"If I'm Dreamin' (Don't Wake Me)"	Ritenour, Martin Page, Maurice White	5:12
4.	"Watercolors"	Don Grusin	5:14
5.	"The Sauce"	Greg Mathieson	4:22
6.	"Butterfly"	Herbie Hancock	5:11
7.	"Hero" (CD edition bonus track)	Ritenour, Grusin	3:52
8.	"Sanctuary"	Ritenour	4:46
9.	"Water from the Moon"	Ritenour	5:33
Total length:			44:28

== Personnel ==
Musicians

- Lee Ritenour – acoustic guitar (1), electric guitars (1, 3, 5–7), guitar melody and solo (1, 2, 4, 8), SynthAxe (1–4, 6, 8), SynthAxe with Oberheim and Yamaha synthesizers (1, 2, 4, 8), electric classical guitar (2, 4–6, 8, 9)
- Dave Grusin – keyboards (1, 2, 4, 6, 9), synth bass (3), acoustic piano (8)
- Marcus Ryle – SynthAxe programming (1, 2), synthesizer programming (7)
- Larry Williams – synthesizers (1), SynthAxe programming (1, 2), horns (1), synthesizer programming (3, 5)
- David Foster – keyboards (3), synth bass (3)
- Don Grusin – synthesizers (4), keyboards (7), synthesizer programming (7)
- Greg Mathieson – keyboards (5), synth bass (5)
- Casey Young – synthesizer programming (5)
- Jimmy Johnson – bass (1, 4, 7, 9)
- Abraham Laboriel – bass (2, 6)
- Carlos Vega – drums (1–3, 5–7, 9)
- Harvey Mason – drums (8)
- Paulinho da Costa – percussion (2–9)
- Ernie Watts – tenor saxophone (1, 4)
- Jerry Hey – horns (1)
- Tom Scott – Lyricon (9)
- Phil Perry – lead vocals (3)
- Maurice White – vocals (3)
- Tommy Funderburk – vocals (3)

Music arrangements

- Lee Ritenour – arrangements (1–3, 5–9)
- Dave Grusin – arrangements (2, 4, 7)
- David Foster – arrangements (3)
- Greg Mathieson – arrangements (5)

Production

- Dave Grusin – executive producer
- Larry Rosen – executive producer
- Lee Ritenour – producer, additional recording
- Greg Mathieson – producer (5)
- Don Murray – recording, mixing, digital editing
- Terry Bowen – second engineer, additional recording
- CMS Digital (Pasadena, California) – editing location
- Wally Traugott – mastering at Capitol Studios (Hollywood, California)
- Andy Baltimore – creative direction, album design
- David Gibb – album design
- Dan Serrano – album design
- Dario Campanile – front cover oil painting
- Victoria Pearson – photography

== Charts ==
Chart (1986)	Peak position
Billboard Jazz Albums	10
