= Friendship (Lee Ritenour album) =

Studio album by Lee Ritenour
- Released: December 13, 1978
- Recorded: May 1978
- Studios: Filmays/Heider Studio (Hollywood, California)
- Genre: Jazz
- Length: 38:58
- Label: Jasrac
- Producer: Toshi Endo

Lee Ritenour chronology
Sugar Loaf Express (1977)	Friendship (1978)	The Captain's Journey (1978)

Professional ratings
Review scores
Source	Rating
Allmusic	3/5 stars

Friendship is a studio album by Lee Ritenour released in 1978. This album was his third out of fourth to be recorded direct to a master disc, with each side of the LP one continuous performance.

== Track listing ==
1. "Sea Dance" (Don Grusin) - 6:12
2. "Crystal Morning" (Lee Ritenour) - 6:46
3. "Samurai Night Fever" (Dave Grusin) - 6:59
4. "Life is the Song We Sing" (Ernie Watts) - 6:17
5. "Woody Creek" (Dave Grusin) - 5:55
6. "It's a Natural Thing" (Watts) - 6:21

== Personnel ==
Musicians

- Lee Ritenour – acoustic guitars, electric guitars
- Dave Grusin – acoustic piano, electric piano
- Don Grusin – electric piano
- Abraham Laboriel – electric bass
- Steve Gadd – drums
- Steve Forman – percussion
- Ernie Watts – soprano saxophone, tenor saxophone

Production

- Toshi Endo – producer
- Phil Schier – recording
- Stan Ricker – mastering
