= Feel the Night =

Studio album by Lee Ritenour
- Released: 1979
- Recorded: 1979
- Studios: Davlen Sound (North Hollywood, California); Producers Workshop (Hollywood, California)
- Genre: Jazz
- Length: 37:19
- Label: Elektra
- Producer: Lee Ritenour

Lee Ritenour chronology
Rio (1979)	Feel the Night (1979)	Friendship (1979)

Feel the Night is an album by American guitarist Lee Ritenour, released in 1979. It was produced by Ritenour.

== Critical reception ==
Professional ratings
Review scores
Source	Rating
AllMusic	2/5 stars

The Globe and Mail wrote that "the popular distaste for session men and a tendency for Ritenour's albums to occasionally lapse into a type of fiery Muzak (his cover of Leo Sayer's 'You Make Me Feel Like Dancing' is a perfect case in point) have tended to keep his albums little known." The Age noted that "much of the album is polished funk."

== Track listing ==
All songs composed by Lee Ritenour, except where noted.

1. "Feel the Night" - 5:32
2. "Market Place" - 5:22
3. "Wicked Wine" - 7:03
4. "French Roast" - 5:06
5. "You Make Me Feel Like Dancing" (Leo Sayer, Vini Poncia) - 4:16
6. "Midnight Lady" - 5:57
7. "Uh Oh!" - 4:03

== Personnel ==
Musicians

- Lee Ritenour – electric guitars, 360 Systems guitar synthesizer (1, 4), acoustic guitar (3), classical guitar (6)
- Michael Boddicker – synthesizers (1, 3–4), synthesizer programming (2)
- David Foster – Fender Rhodes (1), clavinet (1), acoustic piano (2, 5), Yamaha grand piano (3)
- Don Grusin – Fender Rhodes (2–7), clavinet (2), synthesizer intro (2), synthesizers (4), Mexican whistle (7)
- Joe Sample – acoustic piano (4, 7)
- Dave Grusin – acoustic piano (6), Yamaha grand piano (6)
- Ian Underwood – synthesizers (4)
- Steve Lukather – rhythm guitars (3, 5)
- Abraham Laboriel – bass
- Steve Gadd – drums
- Alex Acuña – congas (2, 4), percussion (2), timbales (4), vocal effects (7)
- Steve Forman – percussion (2, 6–7), tambourine (3), castanets (4)
- Ernie Watts – tenor saxophone (1, 7), soprano saxophone (6)
- Larry Williams – flute, piccolo flute, tenor saxophone
- Lew McCreary – bass trombone, trombone
- Bill Reichenbach Jr. – trombone
- Chuck Findley – trumpet, flugelhorn
- Gary Grant – trumpet, flugelhorn
- Jerry Hey – trumpet, flugelhorn
- Patti Austin – lead vocals (5)
- Tom Bahler – vocals (5)

Music arrangements

- Lee Ritenour – arrangements (1–4, 6)
- Don Grusin – arrangements (2, 7)
- Jerry Hey – horn arrangements
- David Foster – additional arrangements
- Steve Gadd – additional arrangements
- Abraham Laboriel – additional arrangements

Production

- Lee Ritenour – producer, mixing
- Don Grusin – associate producer, mixing
- Don Murray – engineer, mixing
- Jeff Borgeson – second engineer
- Chris Desmond – second engineer
- Patrick Von Wiegandt – second engineer
- Bernie Grundman – mastering at A&M Studios (Hollywood, California)
- Ron Coro – art direction
- Kathy Morphesis – design
- Ethan Russell – cover photography
- Debbie Leavitt – inner sleeve photography

== Chart performance ==
Year	Chart	Position
1979	Billboard Jazz Albums	12
1979	Billboard Pop Albums	136
1979	CashBox Jazz Albums	11
1979	CashBox Pop Albums	129
1979	Record World Jazz Albums	10
