= First Course =

Studio album by Lee Ritenour
- Released: 1976
- Recorded: October 3 – 15, 1975
- Studio: The Sound Labs, Hollywood, California
- Genre: Crossover jazz, smooth jazz
- Length: 41:15
- Label: Epic (1976), Columbia (1990)
- Producer: Skip Drinkwater

Lee Ritenour chronology
First Course (1976)	Gentle Thoughts (1977)

Professional ratings
Review scores
Source	Rating
Allmusic	3/5 stars

First Course is the debut album by jazz guitarist Lee Ritenour. The album was released on LP by Epic Records in 1976 and on CD by Columbia Records in 1990.

== Reception ==
First Course was made when Ritenour was considered the best session musician in Los Angeles next to guitarist Larry Carlton. He recorded the album with peers from Dante's and the Baked Potato club in Studio City, California. AllMusic called the album an "artifact of the early L.A. jazz/funk sound".

Ritenour worried about the album. "I was still thinking as a studio musician, and I was very worried about having my own identity on the guitar, because up until that time my job as a studio musician had been to be a 'chameleon'...it wasn't until several years later that I felt more comfortable with who I was stylistically."

Financial problems plagued the album because the "sound perplexed studio executives," who were looking for the next Bitches Brew or Return to Forever. This was melodic rhythm and blues-based jazz that fell just outside the boundaries of "Fusion" and didn't find a home until newly formatted radio stations began to popularize two emerging genres in the mid to late 80's - The genre broadly known as Smooth Jazz, and also "New Age" music, between which there was considerable overlap.

== Track listing ==
All tracks are written by Lee Ritenour except where noted.

No.	Title	Writer(s)	Length
1.	"Little Bit of This and a Little Bit of That"		6:16
2.	"Sweet Syncopation"		4:47
3.	"Theme from Three Days of the Condor"	Dave Grusin	4:08
4.	"Fatback"		4:18
5.	"Memories Past"		1:51
6.	"Caterpillar"	Dave Grusin	4:21
7.	"Canticle for the Universe"	Jerry Peters	6:12
8.	"Wild Rice"		5:32
9.	"Ohla Maria (Amparo)"	Antônio Carlos Jobim	3:50

== Personnel ==
- Lee Ritenour – electric guitars (1–4, 6, 8), classical guitars (5, 9)
- Dave Grusin – Fender Rhodes (1–3, 6–9), synthesizers (2, 3, 6, 7, 9), organ (4), horn arrangements (4, 6), clavinet (8), acoustic piano (9)
- Michael Omartian – clavinet (1), horn arrangements (1)
- Larry Nash – clavinet (2, 4, 6), acoustic piano (4)
- Ian Underwood – synthesizer programming (2, 3, 6, 7, 9)
- Jerry Peters – clavinet (3), acoustic piano (7), synthesizers (7)
- Patrice Rushen – clavinet (8)
- Bill Dickinson – bass (1, 8)
- Louis Johnson – bass (2, 6)
- Chuck Rainey – bass (3, 4, 7)
- Harvey Mason – drums (1–3, 6–8), percussion (2, 3)
- Ed Greene – drums (4)
- Jerry Steinholtz – percussion (3, 7, 8), congas (7, 8)
- Tom Scott – tenor saxophone (1, 2, 4, 6, 8), tenor sax solo (1, 8), horn arrangements (2, 8), lyricon (solo: 4, 8)
- Ernie Watts – tenor saxophone (1)
- Jerome Richardson – baritone saxophone (1, 2, 4, 6, 8)
- Frank Rosolino – trombone (1, 2, 4, 6, 8)
- Chuck Findley – trumpet (1, 2, 4, 6, 8)

=== Production ===
- Jerry Schoenbaum – executive producer
- Skip Drinkwater – producer
- Lee Ritenour – associate producer
- Al Schmitt – engineer
- Linda Tyler – assistant engineer
- Doug Sax – mastering at The Mastering Lab (Hollywood, California)
- Sam Emerson – cover photography
- Fred Valentine – sleeve photography
- Ron Coro – art direction
- Mick Haggerty – design
- Tommy Steele – design

1990 Reissue/Remastered credits

- Nedra Neal – digital producer
- Vic Anesini – remastering at CBS Studios (New York City, New York)
- Chuck Berg – liner notes
