= Lee Ritenour =

American jazz guitarist (born 1952)

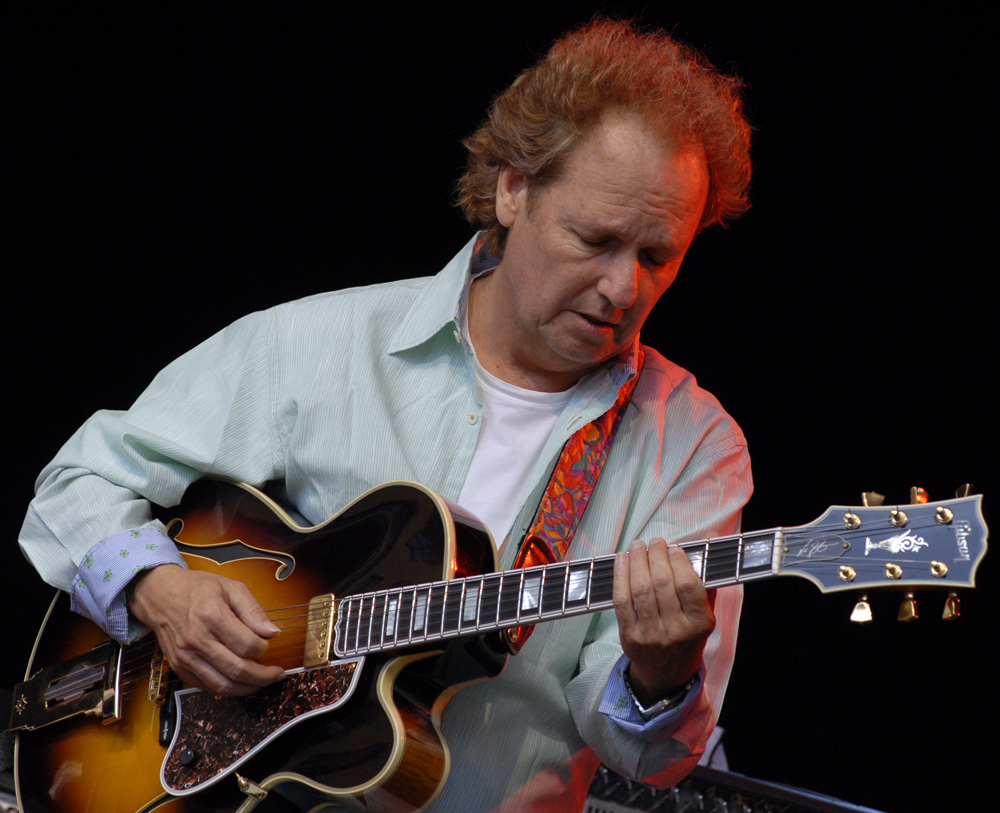
- Ritenour at the Stockholm Jazz Festival, 2009

Background information
- Born: Lee Mack Ritenour; January 11, 1952 (age 74); Los Angeles, California, U.S.
- Genres: Jazz; jazz fusion; crossover jazz; smooth jazz
- Occupations: Musician; composer; producer
- Instrument: Guitar
- Years active: 1968–present
- Labels: Epic; Elektra; GRP; PolyGram; Decca; Peak; Concord; Discovery
- Website: leeritenour.com

Lee Mack Ritenour (/ˈrɪtnaʊər/ RIT-now-ər; born January 11, 1952) is an American jazz and jazz fusion guitarist who has been active since the late 1960s.

== Biography ==
Ritenour was born on January 11, 1952, in Los Angeles, California. At the age of eight he started playing guitar and four years later decided on a career in music. When he was 16 he played on his first recording session with the Mamas & the Papas. He developed a love for jazz and was influenced by guitarist Wes Montgomery. At the age of 17 he worked with Lena Horne and Tony Bennett. He studied classical guitar at the University of Southern California. In the mid-to-late 1970s, Ritenour purchased a 1958 Fender Stratocaster that became one of his primary recording guitars. Between the early 1980s and 1987, it was modified with a 3-ply pickguard, Alembic Strat-o-blaster preamp, an added string tree, a Floyd Rose tremolo with locking nut, and EMG S pickups.

== 1976–1988 ==
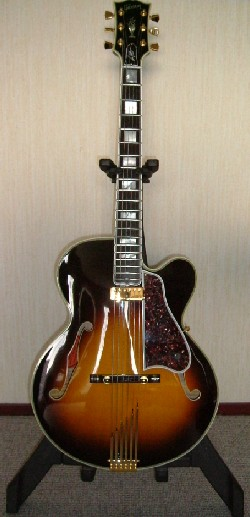
The Lee Ritenour Gibson L5 Signature archtop guitar

Ritenour's solo career began with the album First Course (1976), followed by Captain Fingers (1977), The Captain's Journey (1978).

In 1977, producer Quincy Jones called Ritenour in to perform the iconic, spiraling, triple guitar solo on the Brothers Johnson's smash hit, "Strawberry Letter 23" from their album Right On Time.

In 1979, he "was brought in to beef up" one of Pink Floyd's The Wall's guitar parts, "Run Like Hell". He played "uncredited rhythm guitar" on "One of My Turns". As the 1980s began, Ritenour began to add stronger elements of pop to his music, beginning with Rit (1981). Rit became his only release to chart in Australia, peaking at number 98. "Is It You" with vocals by Eric Tagg reached No. 15 on the Billboard pop chart and No. 27 on the Soul chart. The track peaked at number fifteen on Hot Adult Contemporary chart. He continued with the pop-oriented music for Rit/2 (1982) and Banded Together (1984), while releasing a Direct-Disk instrumental album in 1983 called On the Line. He also provided rhythm guitar on Tom Browne's album Funkin' for Jamaica. He recorded Harlequin (1985) with Dave Grusin and vocals by Ivan Lins. His next album, Earth Run, was nominated for a Grammy Award for Best Jazz Fusion Performance. The album's title track was also Grammy nominated in the category of Best Instrumental Composition. Portrait (GRP, 1987) included guest performances by the Yellowjackets, Djavan, and Kenny G.

In 1988, his Brazilian influence came to the forefront on Festival, an album featuring his work on nylon-string guitar. He changed direction with his straight-ahead jazz album Stolen Moments which he recorded with saxophonist Ernie Watts, pianist Alan Broadbent, bassist John Patitucci, and drummer Harvey Mason. During the same year, he composed the theme song for the Canadian TV series Ramona.

== 1990–present ==
In 1991, Ritenour and keyboardist Bob James formed the group Fourplay. He left the group in 1997 and was replaced by Larry Carlton. He released the career retrospective Overtime in 2005. Smoke n' Mirrors came out the next year with the debut of his thirteen-year-old son, Wesley, on drums.

Celebrating his fifty years as a guitarist in 2010, Ritenour released 6 String Theory, a title that refers to six musical areas covered by the use of guitar.

Ritenour has been a judge for the Independent Music Awards.

In 2018, Ritenour lost his Malibu home and personal recording studio in the Woolsey Fire in California.

== Lead vocalists ==
Lee Ritenour's first few solo albums consisted entirely of instrumentals. Beginning with Captain Fingers (1977), Ritenour used vocalists on many of his songs:

- Djavan
- Bill Champlin
- Eric Tagg
- Patti Austin
- Ivan Lins
- Phil Perry
- João Bosco
- Kate Markowitz
- Maxi Priest
- Lisa Fischer
- Michael McDonald

== Awards ==
=== Grammy Awards ===
Ritenour has received one Grammy award out of sixteen nominations.

Year	Category	Nominated work	Result
1978	Grammy Award for Best Instrumental Composition	"The Captain's Journey"	Nominated
1981	Grammy Award for Best Pop Instrumental Performance	RIT	Nominated
1985	Grammy Award for Best Arrangement on an Instrumental	"Early A.M. Attitude"	Won
1985	Grammy Award for Best Pop Instrumental Performance (Orchestra, Group or Soloist)	Harlequin	Nominated
1985	Grammy Award for Best Instrumental Arrangement Accompanying Vocal(s)	"Harlequin"	Nominated
1986	Grammy Award for Best Jazz Fusion Performance, Vocal or Instrumental	Earth Run	Nominated
1986	Grammy Award for Best Instrumental Composition	"Earth Run"	Nominated
1990	Grammy Award for Best Jazz Fusion Performance	Stolen Moments	Nominated
1993	Grammy Award for Best Contemporary Jazz Performance (Instrumental)	Between the Sheets	Nominated
1993	Grammy Award for Best Jazz Instrumental Solo	"4 on 6"	Nominated
1993	Grammy Award for Best Jazz Instrumental Performance, Individual or Group	Wes Bound	Nominated
1994	Grammy Award for Best Instrumental Arrangement with Accompanying Vocals	"Ability to Swing"	Nominated
1995	Grammy Award for Best Contemporary Jazz Performance	Elixir	Nominated
1995	Grammy Award for Best Contemporary Jazz Performance	Larry and Lee	Nominated
1997	Grammy Award for Best Contemporary Jazz Performance	Alive in L.A.	Nominated
1997	Grammy Award for Best Classical Crossover Album	Two Worlds	Nominated

- Album of the Year, Jazziz magazine (2010) - 6 String Theory.
- Best International Instrumentalist, Echo Jazz Award (2011)

== Discography ==
=== Albums ===
Title	Peak chart positions		Label	Year released
Title	US	US Jazz	Label	Year released
First Course	—	—	Epic	1976
Captain Fingers	178	—	Epic	1977
Gentle Thoughts	—	—	JVC	1977
Sugar Loaf Express	—	—	JVC	1977
Friendship	—	—	JVC	1978
The Captain's Journey	78	—	Elektra	1978
Rio	163	—	JVC	1979
Feel the Night	136	—	Elektra	1979
Rit	26	—	Elektra	1981
Rit/2	99	—	Elektra	1982
On the Line	—	—	Elektra Musician	1983
Banded Together	145	—	Elektra	1984
Harlequin, with Dave Grusin	192	—	GRP	1985
Earth Run	—	—	GRP	1986
Portrait	—	—	GRP	1987
Festival	156	—	GRP	1988
Color Rit	—	—	GRP	1989
Stolen Moments	—	—	GRP	1990
Collection	—	—	GRP	1991
Wes Bound	—	19	GRP	1993
Larry & Lee, with Larry Carlton	—	4	GRP	1995
Alive in L.A.	—	18	GRP	1997
This Is Love	—	4	I.E. Music	1998
Two Worlds, with Dave Grusin	—	—	Decca	2000
Rit's House	—	5	Verve	2002
World of Brazil	—	—	GRP	2003
Overtime	—	24	Peak	2005
Smoke 'n' Mirrors	—	10	Peak	2006
Amparo, with Dave Grusin	—	—	Decca	2008
6 String Theory	—	—	Concord	2010
Rhythm Sessions	—	3	Concord	2012
A Twist of Rit	—	3	Concord	2015
Dreamcatcher	—	—	The Players Club	2020
Brasil	—	—	Candid	2024

=== Charted singles ===
Date	Title	Position	Chart (US)
1981	"Countdown Captain Fingers"	43	Dance
1981	"Is It You"	15	Hot 100
1982	"Cross My Heart"	69	Hot 100
1993	"Waiting in Vain" (ft. Maxi Priest)	54	R&B
2007	"Smoke 'n' Mirrors"	27	Smooth Jazz
2007	"Forget Me Nots"	14	Smooth Jazz
2010	"Shape of My Heart" (Lee Ritenour, Steve Lukather & Andy McKee)	19	Smooth Jazz
2010	"Put the Top Down" (Dave Koz ft. Lee Ritenour)	1	Smooth Jazz
2012	"Roadtrip" (Michael Lington ft. Lee Ritenour)	3	Smooth Jazz
2013	"The Village"	3	Smooth Jazz
2013	"L.A. by Bike"	15	Smooth Jazz
2015	"A Little Bit of This and a Little Bit of That"	5	Smooth Jazz

=== As a member ===
Friendship
With Abraham Laboriel, Alex Acuña, Don Grusin, Ernie Watts and Steve Forman

- Friendship (Elektra, 1979)

L.A. Workshop

- Norwegian Wood (This Bird Has Flown) (Denon, 1988)
- Norwegian Wood, Vol. 2 (Denon, 1994)

Fourplay

- Fourplay (Warner Bros., 1991)
- Between the Sheets (Warner Bros., 1993)
- Elixir (Warner Bros., 1995)
- Best of Fourplay (Warner Bros., 1997)

GRP All-Star Big Band

- GRP All-Star Big Band (GRP, 1992)

=== Other credits ===
- 1977 "Strawberry Letter 23" from the album Right On Time by Brothers Johnson
- 1987 Joyride - track 6 "Midi Citi" - (En Pointe)
- 1985 American Flyers (Original Motion Picture Soundtrack) with Greg Mathieson - GRP

=== As sideman ===
With Alessi Brothers

- Driftin' (A&M, 1977)
- Words & Music (A&M, 1978)

With Patti Austin

- Love Is Gonna Getcha (GRP, 1990)
- That Secret Place (GRP, 1994)

With Carole Bayer Sager

- Carole Bayer Sager (Elektra, 1977)
- ...Too (Elektra, 1978)
- Sometimes Late at Night (Boardwalk, 1981)

With George Benson

- Give Me the Night (Warner Bros., 1980)
- Songs and Stories (Concord, 2009)

With The Brothers Johnson

- Look Out for #1 (A&M, 1976)
- Right on Time (A&M, 1977)

With Natalie Cole

- Thankful (Capitol, 1977)
- Stardust (Elektra, 1996)

With Judy Collins

- Hard Times for Lovers (Elektra, 1979)
- Home Again (Elektra, 1984)

With Brass Fever

- Brass Fever (Impulse!, 1975)
- Time Is Running Out (Impulse!, 1976)

With Aretha Franklin

- You (Atlantic, 1975)
- Sweet Passion (Atlantic, 1977)

With Art Garfunkel

- Breakaway (Columbia, 1975)
- Fate for Breakfast (Columbia, 1979)

With Margie Joseph

- Hear the Words, Feel the Feeling (Cotillion, 1976)
- Feeling My Way (Atlantic, 1978)

With Bill LaBounty

- Promised Love (Curb, 1975)
- This Night Won't Last Forever (Warner Bros., 1978)

With Melissa Manchester

- Don't Cry Out Loud (Arista, 1978)
- Mathematics (MCA, 1985)

With Letta Mbulu

- There's Music in the Air (A&M, 1976)
- Letta (A&M, 1978)

With Alphonse Mouzon

- 1974: Mind Transplant (Blue Note, 1975)
- 1975: The Man Incognito (Blue Note, 1976)

With Leo Sayer

- Endless Flight (Chrysalis, 1976)
- Thunder in My Heart (Chrysalis, 1977)

With Neil Sedaka

- All You Need Is the Music (Elektra, 1978)
- In the Pocket (Elektra, 1980)

With Carly Simon

- Playing Possum (Elektra, 1975)
- Torch (Warner Bros., 1981)

With Barbra Streisand

- Lazy Afternoon (Columbia, 1975)
- Songbird (Columbia, 1978)
- Guilty (Columbia, 1980) – rec. 1979–1980

With others

- Herb Alpert, Herb Alpert / Hugh Masekela (Horizon, 1978)
- Paul Anka, The Painter (United Artists, 1976)
- Stephen Bishop, Careless (ABC, 1976)
- Simone Bittencourt de Oliveira, Corpo e Alma (CBS, 1982)
- Lisa Hartman Black, Lisa Hartman (Kirshner, 1976)
- Bobby Bland, Reflections in Blue (ABC, 1977)
- Bloodstone, Don't Stop (Motown, 1978)
- Debby Boone, Debby Boone (Capitol, 1979)
- Glen Campbell, Basic (Capitol, 1978)
- Captain & Tennille, Make Your Move (Casablanca, 1979)
- The Carpenters, Passage (A&M, 1977)
- Keith Carradine, I'm Easy (Asylum, 1976)
- Casiopea, 4x4 (Alfa, 1982)
- David Castle, Castle in the Sky (Parachute, 1977)
- Cher, I'd Rather Believe in You (Warner Bros., 1976)
- Sparks, Introducing Sparks (Columbia, 1977)
- Paulinho da Costa, Agora (Pablo, 1977)
- England Dan & John Ford Coley, Dr. Heckle and Mr. Jive (Big Tree, 1979)
- John Denver, I Want to Live (RCA, 1977)
- Diana DeGarmo, Blue Skies (RCA, 2004)
- Neil Diamond, Heartlight (Columbia, 1982)
- Will Downing, Sensual Journey (Verve, 2002)
- Sheena Easton, A Private Heaven (EMI, 1984)
- Yvonne Elliman, Yvonne (RSO, 1979)
- Joe Farrell, Night Dancing (Warner Bros, 1978)
- Roberta Flack, I'm the One (Atlantic, 1982)
- Pink Floyd, The Wall (EMI, 1979)
- Four Tops, Night Lights Harmony (ABC, 1975)
- Ted Gärdestad, Blue Virgin Isles (Polar, 1978)
- Dizzy Gillespie, Free Ride (Pablo, 1977)
- Cyndi Grecco, Making Our Dreams Come True (Private Stock Records, 1976)
- Lani Hall, Sweet Bird (A&M, 1976)
- John Handy, Carnival (Impulse, 1977)
- Eddie Henderson, Comin' Through (Capitol, 1977)
- Joe Henderson, Black Miracle (Milestone, 1976)
- Marcia Hines, Ooh Child (Miracle Records, 1979)
- Al Jarreau, All Fly Home (Warner Bros., 1978)
- Al Johnson, Back for More (Columbia, 1980)
- Quincy Jones, Roots (A&M, 1977)
- Karimata, Jezz (Aquarius, 1991) – on "Rainy Days and You" only
- B. B. King, King Size (ABC, 1977)
- Ben E. King, Let Me Live in Your Life (Atlantic, 1978)
- Carole King, Speeding Time (Atlantic, 1983)
- Peggy Lee, Let's Love (Atlantic, 1974)
- Kenny Loggins, Celebrate Me Home (Columbia, 1977) – rec. 1975–1976
- Marilyn McCoo & Billy Davis Jr., Marilyn & Billy (Columbia, 1978)
- Mary MacGregor, Mary MacGregor (RSO, 1980)
- Johnny Mathis and Deniece Williams, That's What Friends Are For (Columbia, 1979)
- Barry Manilow, Even Now (Arista, 1978)
- Lonette McKee, Words and Music (Warner Bros., 1978)
- Bette Midler, Broken Blossom (Atlantic, 1977)
- Walter Murphy, Phantom of the Opera (Private Stock, 1978)
- Anne Murray, Together (Capitol, 1975)
- Oliver Nelson, Skull Session (Flying Dutchman, 1975)
- David "Fathead" Newman, Keep the Dream Alive (Prestige, 1978)
- Olivia Newton-John, Soul Kiss (MCA, 1985)
- Wayne Newton, Tomorrow (Chelsea Records, 1976)
- Kenny Nolan, A Song Between Us (Polydor, 1978)
- Michael Omartian, Adam Again (Myrrh, 1977)
- Freda Payne, Hot (Capitol, 1979)
- June Pointer, Baby Sister (Planet, 1983)
- The Pointer Sisters, So Excited! (Planet, 1982)
- Michel Polnareff, Michel Polnareff (Atlantic, 1975)
- Minnie Riperton, Love Lives Forever (Capitol, 1980)
- Sonny Rollins, The Way I Feel (Milestone, 1977)
- Brenda Russell, Between the Sun and the Moon (Dome, 2004)
- Evie Sands, Suspended Animation (RCA Victor, 1979)
- Lalo Schifrin, Rollercoaster (MCA, 1977) – soundtrack
- Diane Schuur, Schuur Thing (GRP, 1985)
- Seals and Crofts, Get Closer (Warner Bros., 1976)
- Raul Seixas, O Dia em que a Terra Parou (WEA, 1977)
- Nancy Shanks, Nancy Shanx (United Artists, 1977)
- Frank Sinatra, L.A. Is My Lady (Qwest, 1984)
- Steely Dan, Aja (ABC Records, 1977)
- Suzanne Stevens, Crystal Carriage (Capitol, 1977)
- Livingston Taylor, Three Way Mirror (Epic, 1978)
- Naoko Terai, Live (Videoarts Music, 2001)
- Stanley Turrentine, Everybody Come On Out (Fantasy, 1976)
- Frankie Valli, Valli (Private Stock, 1976)
- Sarah Vaughan, Songs of the Beatles (Atlantic, 1981)
- Grover Washington Jr., The Best Is Yet to Come (Elektra, 1982)
- The Whispers, Open Up Your Love (Soul Train, 1977)
- Lenny Williams, Sparks of Love (ABC, 1978)
- Syreeta Wright, Syreeta (Tamla, 1980)
