= Sugar Loaf Express =

Studio album by Lee Ritenour
- Released: 1977
- Studio: Kendun Recorders (Burbank, California)
- Genre: Jazz
- Label: JVC
- Producer: Toshi Endo

Lee Ritenour chronology
Captain Fingers (1977)	Sugar Loaf Express (1977)	Friendship (1978)

Sugar Loaf Express is a direct to disc studio album by jazz guitarist Lee Ritenour that was released in 1977.

== Track listing ==
1. "Sugar Loaf Express" (Lee Ritenour) - 6:14
2. "Morning Glory" (Ritenour) - 6:25
3. "That's the Way of the World" (Charles Stepney, Maurice White, Verdine White) - 5:31
4. "Slippin' in the Back Door" (Dave Grusin, Harvey Mason, Louis Johnson) - 5:19
5. "Tomorrow" (George Johnson, L. Johnson) - 7:05
6. "Lady Soul" (David Matthews) - 5:08

== Musicians ==
- Lee Ritenour – guitars
- Eric Gale – guitars
- Patrice Rushen – acoustic piano, Fender Rhodes
- Abraham Laboriel – bass guitar
- Harvey Mason – drums
- Steve Forman – percussion

=== Production ===
- Toshi Endo – producer
- Lee Ritenour – associate producer
- Phil Schier – engineer
- Terry Moore – assistant engineer
- Gil Weber – assistant engineer
- John Golden – mastering
- Jo Hansch – mastering
- Tom Nishida – sound director
- Kintaro Arai – album artist
