= Brasileiro =

Studio album by Sérgio Mendes
- Released: 17 June 1992
- Recorded: April–October 1991
- Studio: Polygram Studios (Rio De Janeiro); Som Livre Studios (Rio De Janeiro); Castle Oaks Studio (Los Angeles)
- Genre: Samba; batucada; bossa nova; latin pop
- Length: 52:40
- Label: Elektra
- Producer: Sérgio Mendes

Sérgio Mendes chronology
Arara (1989)	Brasileiro (1992)	Oceano (1996)

Professional ratings
Review scores
Source	Rating
AllMusic	4.5/5 stars

Brasileiro (Note: Brazilian Portuguese pronunciation: [bɾaziˈlejɾu], lit. 'Brazilian') is a 1992 album by Sérgio Mendes and other artists including Carlinhos Brown which won the 1993 Grammy Award for Best World Music Album. It marked Mendes's return to Elektra Records since 1979's Magic Lady with Brasil '88. The album included Magalenha, a batucada style song by Brazilian musician Carlinhos Brown.

== Track listing ==
1. "Fanfarra" (Carlinhos Brown)– 4:03
2. "Magalenha" (Carlinhos Brown)– 3:39
3. "Indiado" (Carlinhos Brown)– 4:17
4. "What Is This?" (Carmen Alice)– 4:46
5. "Lua Soberana" (Vítor Martins, Ivan Lins)– 4:13
6. "Sambadouro" (Vítor Martins, Ivan Lins)– 3:51
7. "Senhoras Do Amazonas" (Antonio Carlos Belchior, João Bosco)– 4:41
8. "Kalimba" (Vítor Martins, Ivan Lins)– 4:19
9. "Barabare" (Paulinho Camafeu, Edmundo Caruso, Carlinhos Brown)– 3:24
10. "Esconjuros" (Aldir Blanc, Carlos "Guinga" Escobar)– 3:40
11. "Pipoca" (Hermeto Pascoal)– 3:10
12. "Magano" (Carlinhos Brown)– 4:36
13. "Chorado" (Aldir Blanc, Carlos "Guinga" Escobar)– 3:24
14. "Fanfarra" (Despedida) (Carlinhos Brown)– 0:29

== Personnel ==
Musicians and Arrangements

- Sérgio Mendes – arrangements (1–10, 12–14), keyboards (3–13), synthesizers (3–5, 7–10, 12, 13), percussion (6, 9, 12)
- Alfredo Moura – keyboards (3, 9, 12), synthesizers (3, 9, 12), synth horns (3, 12), arrangements (3, 9, 12)
- Eric Persing – keyboard and synthesizer programming (3–5, 8, 9, 12, 13), synth horn programming (3, 12), keyboard programming (6), arrangements (4), keyboards (13), synthesizers (13)
- Robbie Buchanan – keyboards (5, 8), synthesizers (5, 8), synthesizer effects (7)
- Russell Ferrante – keyboards (10), synthesizers (10)
- Hermeto Pascoal – keyboards (11), arrangements (11)
- Jovino Santos Neto – keyboards (11)
- Alceu do Cavaco – cavaquinho (1)
- Paul Jackson Jr. – guitars (3, 5, 6, 8, 9)
- Cláudio Jorge – acoustic guitar (6)
- João Bosco – acoustic guitar (7)
- Guinga (Carlos Althier de Souza Lemos Escobar) – acoustic guitar (10, 13)
- Jimmy Johnson – bass (3, 9, 10)
- Nathan East – bass (5, 6, 8)
- Arthur Maia – bass (7)
- Itibere Zwarg – bass (11)
- Jeff Porcaro – drums (3, 5, 8, 9), percussion (7)
- Mike Shapiro – drums (6), percussion (10, 11)
- Carlos Bala – drums (7)
- Marcio Bahia – drums (11)
- 100 "All-Star" percussionists from LIESA – percussion (1, 14)
- Carlinhos Brown – percussion (2–4, 10, 12), arrangements (2, 3, 12)
- Vai Quem Vem – percussion (2, 4, 9, 12)
- Luis Conte – percussion (5–8, 11)
- Beloba (Carlos da Silva Pinto) – percussion (6)
- Sebastião Neto – percussion (9, 12)
- Meia Noite (Nailton Bispo dos Santos) – percussion (10)
- Fabio Pascoal – percussion (11)
- Pernambuco (Antonio Luis de Santana) – percussion (11)
- Jerry Moore – tenor saxophone (3)
- Steve Tavaglione – flutes (10), oboes (10), alto saxophone (8, 12), tenor saxophone (12), soprano saxophone (5)
- Carlos Malta – flute (11), saxophones (11)
- Moogie Canazio – arrangements (1, 4, 14)
- Bruce Swedien – arrangements (4)

Vocalists

- Sérgio Mendes – vocals (1), backing vocals (2–4, 6, 11, 12)
- Francisca Maria Monjardim – vocals (1), backing vocals (2, 12)
- Leila Monjardim – vocals (1), backing vocals (2, 12)
- Sebastião Neto – vocals (1), backing vocals (2, 3, 12)
- Lourenco Olegario – vocals (1), backing vocals (2, 3, 12)
- Karla Preito – vocals (1), backing vocals (2, 12)
- Jurema Silva – vocals (1), backing vocals (2, 12)
- Jussara Silva – vocals (1), backing vocals (2, 12)
- Leo Silva – vocals (1), backing vocals (2, 3, 12)
- Robson Silva – vocals (1), backing vocals (2, 3, 12)
- Carlinhos Brown – lead vocals (2, 3, 9, 12), backing vocals (3)
- Gracinha Leporace – lead vocals (3, 5, 7–10), backing vocals (3–6, 8), vocals (6, 11)
- Val Quem Vem – backing vocals (4)
- Carmen Alice (Vai Quem Vem) – lead vocals (4)
- Kleber Jorge – backing vocals (4, 6)
- Kevyn Lettau – backing vocals (4–6, 8), vocals (6, 11), lead vocals (8)
- Vivian Manso – backing vocals (4–6, 8)
- Alfredo Moura – backing vocals (4, 6)
- Carol Rogers – backing vocals (4, 6), vocals (6)
- Mike Shapiro – backing vocals (4, 6)
- Carolina Saboia – backing vocals (5, 8)
- Joe Pizzulo – backing vocals (6), vocals (11)
- João Bosco – lead vocals (7)
- Cláudio Nucci – lead vocals (13)

=== Production ===
- Sérgio Mendes – producer
- Moogie Canazio – engineer, mixing (1–3, 5, 8–14)
- Bruce Swedien – mixing (4, 6, 7)
- Michael Aarvold – assistant engineer
- Elaine Anderson – assistant engineer
- Ivan Carvalho – assistant engineer
- Lee Kaiser – assistant engineer
- Luis Quine – assistant engineer
- Paul Scriver – assistant engineer
- Bernie Grundman – mastering at Bernie Grundman Mastering (Hollywood, California)
- David Bither – art direction
- John Heiden – art direction, design
- Heitor dos Prazeres – cover artwork
- George Holz – back cover photography
- Sonia Ives – booklet photography
- Chris McGowan – liner notes
