= Festival (Lee Ritenour album) =

Studio album by Lee Ritenour
- Released: 1988
- Recorded: May 16–20, 1988
- Studio: The Power Station (New York City, New York) Starlight Studios (Malibu, California)
- Genre: Jazz fusion, smooth jazz
- Length: 43:20
- Language: English, Portuguese
- Label: GRP
- Producer: Lee Ritenour

Lee Ritenour chronology
Portrait (1987)	Festival (1988)	Color Rit (1989)

Professional ratings
Review scores
Source	Rating
AllMusic	4/5 stars

Festival is an album by American jazz guitarist Lee Ritenour that was released in 1988 by GRP Records. The album is a collaboration between musicians from New York City, Los Angeles, and Brazil. Festival reached No. 3 on the Billboard Contemporary Jazz chart.

== Track listing ==
1. "Night Rhythms" (Ritenour) – 4:32
2. "Latin Lovers" (Aldir Blanc, Joao Bosco) – 6:17
3. "Humana" (Ivan Lins, Vítor Martins) – 4:39
4. "Rio Sol" (Tim Landers) – 5:24
5. "Waiting for You" (Ritenour) – 2:23
6. "Odile, Odila" (Joao Bosco, Martinho da Vila) – 4:58
7. "Linda – Voce E Linda" (Caetano Veloso) – 5:28
8. "New York/Brazil" (Ritenour) – 4:22
9. "The Inner Look" (Bob James) – 5:17

== Personnel ==
Musicians and vocalists

- Lee Ritenour – acoustic guitar (1, 2, 4, 6, 7, 9), acoustic guitar synthesizer (3, 5, 6, 8)
- Robbie Kondor – synthesizer programming
- Dave Grusin – keyboards (1, 2, 6, 7)
- Bob James – keyboards (3, 4, 8, 9), keyboard solos (9)
- Joao Bosco – acoustic guitar (2, 6), lead vocals (2, 6)
- Marcus Miller – bass (1, 4, 6, 9), bass solo (4)
- Anthony Jackson – 6-string bass (2), bass (3, 7, 8)
- Omar Hakim – drums (1–4, 6–9)
- Paulinho da Costa – percussion (1, 3, 4, 6), bells (7), bongos (7, 8)
- Carlinhos Brown – pandeiro (1), djembe (2, 6), cabasa (7), percussion (8, 9)
- Ernie Watts – tenor saxophone (1, 4), alto saxophone (3)
- Randy Kerber – horns and strings (2, 7)
- Larry Williams – saxophones (3, 4, 8), flute (3, 4, 8), strings (3, 4, 8)
- Jerry Hey – trumpet (3, 4, 8), flugelhorn (3, 4, 8), strings (3, 4, 8)
- Gracinha Leporace – backing vocals (2, 6)
- Caetano Veloso – lead vocals (7)

Music arrangements

- Lee Ritenour – rhythm arrangements
- Johnny Mandel – horn and string arrangements (2, 7)
- Jerry Hey – horn and string arrangements (3, 4, 8)
- Dave Grusin – arrangements (6)

=== Production ===
- Dave Grusin – executive producer
- Larry Rosen – executive producer
- Lee Ritenour – producer, liner notes
- Don Murray – producer, engineer, digital recording, digital mixing
- Kevin Dixon – second engineer
- Peter Doell – second engineer
- Arnold Madlener – second engineer
- Gary Solomon – assistant engineer
- Larry Walsh – digital editing
- Wally Traugott – digital mastering at Capitol Studios (Hollywood, California)
- Zero Nylin – production assistant
- Suzanne Sherman – production coordinator
- Antonio Peticov – front cover artwork
- Andy Baltimore – creative direction, graphic design
- David Gibb – graphic design
- Dave Kunze – graphic design
- Ivan Salgano – graphic design
- Dan Serrano – graphic design
- Chris Cuffaro – black and white photography, back cover photography
- Judy Schiller – black and white photography
- Shankman/De Blasio – management

== Charts ==
Chart (1988)	Peak position
Billboard Jazz Albums	3
