= Captain Fingers =

Studio album by Lee Ritenour
- Released: 1977
- Studios: Kendun Recorders (Burbank, California); Sound Labs and United Western Recorders (Hollywood, California)
- Genre: Jazz fusion
- Length: 40:53
- Label: Epic
- Producers: Lee Ritenour; Skip Drinkwater; Jerry Schoenbaum

Lee Ritenour chronology
Gentle Thoughts (1977)	Captain Fingers (1977)	Sugar Loaf Express (1977)

Professional ratings
Review scores
Source	Rating
AllMusic	2/5 stars

Captain Fingers is the third studio album by guitarist Lee Ritenour, released in 1977 by Epic Records.

== Track listing ==
No.	Title	Writer(s)	Length
1.	"Captain Fingers"	Lee Ritenour	7:06
2.	"Dolphin Dreams"	Ritenour	7:05
3.	"Fly by Night"	Dave Grusin	5:03
4.	"Margarita"	Ritenour	5:11
5.	"Isn't She Lovely"	Stevie Wonder	4:34
6.	"Space Glide"	Mitch Holder, Eddie Arkin	5:10
7.	"Sun Song"	Grusin	6:44
Total length:			40:53

== Personnel ==
- Lee Ritenour – electric guitars, 360 Systems Polyphonic guitar synthesizer (1, 2, 4, 6), electric 12-string guitar (2), acoustic guitar (2), classical guitar (7)
- Dave Grusin – Oberheim Polyphonic Synthesizer (1, 3), electric piano (2, 3, 7), clavinet (3), Minimoog (3), arrangements and conductor (3, 7)
- Dawilli Gonga – electric piano (1, 4)
- Patrice Rushen – electric piano (1)
- Ian Underwood – acoustic piano (1), Oberheim Polyphonic synthesizer (1, 2, 4), synthesizer programming (3)
- David Foster – electric piano (5, 6)
- Jay Graydon – rhythm guitar (1)
- Ray Parker Jr. – rhythm guitar (5, 6)
- Mitch Holder – rhythm guitar (6)
- Dennis Budimir – rhythm guitar (7)
- Anthony Jackson – bass (1–3)
- Alphonso Johnson – bass (1, 4)
- Mike Porcaro – bass (5)
- Charles Meeks – bass (6)
- Bill Dickinson – bass (7)
- Harvey Mason – drums (1–4, 7), percussion (2, 3, 6, 7)
- Jeff Porcaro – drums (5, 6)
- Steve Forman – percussion (2, 5, 7)
- Victor Feldman – congas (3, 6)
- Steve Mason – percussion (4, 6)
- Ernie Watts – soprano saxophone (3), tenor saxophone (6)
- Ray Cramer – cello solo (7)
- Michel Colombier – string arrangements and conductor (2)
- Bill Champlin – vocals (5)

== Production ==
- Jerry Schoenbaum – executive producer
- Skip Drinkwater – producer
- Lee Ritenour – associate producer
- John Mills – engineer, remixing
- Don Murray – engineer, remixing
- Tommy Vicari – engineer, remixing
- Linda Tyler – assistant engineer
- Danny Vicari – assistant engineer
- Bernie Grundman – mastering at A&M Studios (Hollywood, California)
- Joe Gastwirt – remastering
- Bruce Steinberg – art direction, design, cover photography
- Bob Wirtz – sleeve photography
- Stuart Nicholson – liner notes

== Charts ==
Year	Chart	Position
1977	Billboard 200	178
1977	Billboard Jazz Albums	31
