= Friendship (jazz fusion band) =

Jazz fusion supergroup formed in 1979

- Friendship, as they appeared on the back cover of their self-titled album, 1979. From left: Alex Acuña, Ernie Watts, Don Grusin, Abraham Laboriel, Steve Foreman and Lee Ritenour

Background information
- Origin: California, United States
- Years active: 1978 - 1979
- Past members: Alex Acuña; Steve Foreman; Don Grusin; Abraham Laboriel; Lee Ritenour; Ernie Watts

Friendship was a short-lived jazz fusion supergroup formed in 1979.

The band, featuring guitarist Lee Ritenour, keyboardist Don Grusin, bassist Abraham Laboriel, drunmer Alex Acuña, saxophonist Ernie Watts, and percussionist Steve Foreman, released their first and only album, Friendship, in late 1979.

== Discography ==
- 1979: Friendshp (Elektra)
