= Gentle Thoughts =

Studio album by Lee Ritenour
- Released: 1977
- Studio: Warner Bros. Recording Studio (Hollywood, California)
- Genre: Jazz
- Label: JVC
- Producer: Mah Young

Lee Ritenour chronology
First Course (1976)	Gentle Thoughts (1977)	Captain Fingers (1977)

Professional ratings
Review scores
Source	Rating
Allmusic	3/5 stars

Gentle Thoughts is the second solo album by Lee Ritenour, and was released as a Direct-to-disc recording. It features Ernie Watts, Dave Grusin, Patrice Rushen, Anthony Jackson, Harvey Mason and Steve Forman.

== Track listing ==
=== Side one ===
1. "Captain Caribe/Getaway" – 9:57
2. "Chanson" (Dave Grusin) – 3:55
3. "Meiso" (Harvey Mason Sr.) – 5:18

=== Side two ===
1. "Captain Fingers" – 5:36
2. "Feel Like Makin' Love" (Gene McDaniels) – 4:48
3. "Gentle Thoughts" (Herbie Hancock, Melvin "Wah Wah" Ragin) – 8:41

== Personnel ==
- Lee Ritenour – electric guitars
- Dave Grusin – Steinway grand piano (1–3), Fender Rhodes (1–3)
- Patrice Rushen – Steinway grand piano (4–6), Fender Rhodes (4–6)
- Anthony Jackson – bass guitar
- Harvey Mason – drums
- Steve Forman – percussion
- Ernie Watts – saxophones, flute

=== Production ===
- Mah Young – producer
- Lee Ritenour – associate producer
- Phil Scheir – engineer
- Bob Hata – chief mastering
- Ken Deane – mastering
- Rudy Hill – mastering
- Tom Nishida – sound director
- Kintaro Arai – album concept, jacket design
- Yoshi Ohara – photography
- Jeffrey Weber – liner notes
