= Carol Rogers =

Carol(e) Ro(d)gers may refer to:

- Carol Rogers (musician) in Omaha Black Music Hall of Fame
- Carole Rodgers, character in Ann Carver's Profession
