= Wes Bound =

Studio album by Lee Ritenour
- Released: 1993
- Recorded: September – October 1992
- Studio: Starlight Studio (Malibu, California); Sunset Sound and Capitol Studios (Hollywood, California); The Enterprise (Burbank, California)
- Genre: Jazz
- Length: 53:31
- Label: GRP
- Producer: Lee Ritenour

Lee Ritenour chronology
Collection (1991)	Wes Bound (1993)	Larry and Lee (1995)

Wes Bound is an album by American jazz guitarist Lee Ritenour that was released in 1993 by GRP Records. The album comprises a mix of cover versions of original songs by famed jazz electric guitarist Wes Montgomery and Lee Ritenour originals in similar style, with a stellar cast of supporting musicians and studio technicians. Some years after its original release, it was reissued (in limited numbers) with the benefits of 20 bit digital remastering, which many consider transformed it from merely good to a truly great album. 'Wes Bound' received a Grammy Award nomination for Best Jazz Instrumental Performance, Individual or Group and reached No. 1 on the Billboard magazine Contemporary Jazz chart.

== Track listing ==
No.	Title	Writer(s)	Length
1.	"Wes Bound"	Ritenour	5:52
2.	"Boss City"	Wes Montgomery	4:46
3.	"4 on 6"	Wes Montgomery	6:05
4.	"A Little Bumpin'"	Ritenour	4:27
5.	"Waiting in Vain" (with Maxi Priest)	Bob Marley	5:09
6.	"Goin' on to Detroit"	Wes Montgomery	4:34
7.	"A New Day"	Ritenour	5:28
8.	"Ocean Avenue"	Ritenour	4:14
9.	"Road Song"	Wes Montgomery	4:45
10.	"West Coast Blues"	Wes Montgomery	4:30
11.	"N.Y. Time" (bonus track on international edition)	Ritenour	3:16

== Personnel ==
- Lee Ritenour – guitars, electronic percussion (1), arrangements (1, 3, 4, 6–11), rhythm arrangements (5)
- Bob James – keyboards (1, 4, 7, 9, 10), acoustic piano (1, 4, 7, 9, 10)
- David Witham – Hammond B3 organ (2), organ (5)
- Ronnie Foster – Hammond B3 organ (3)
- John Beasley – keyboards (6, 8, 11)
- Alan Broadbent – acoustic piano (6, 11), acoustic piano solo (8)
- Melvin Lee Davis – bass (1, 2, 4, 7, 9, 10)
- John Patitucci – bass (6, 11), acoustic bass (8)
- Harvey Mason – drums (1, 3, 4, 6–10), electronic percussion (1), percussion (2, 8, 10)
- Gary Novak – drums (2)
- Aaron Smith – drum programming (5), rhythm arrangements (5)
- Steve Gadd – drums (11)
- Cassio Duarte – percussion (4–9)
- Mitch Holder – arrangements (2)
- Maxi Priest – lead vocals (5)
- Kate Markowitz – backing vocals (5)
- Phil Perry – backing vocals (5)
- Carmen Twillie – backing vocals (5)

Horns and Flutes

- Jerry Hey – horn arrangements (1–5, 7, 9, 10), flute arrangements (1, 4, 7, 9, 10)
- Alan Broadbent – flute arrangements (6)
- Gary Herbig, Dan Higgins, Kim Hutchcroft and Steve Kujala – alto flute, flute
- Dan Higgins – alto saxophone, tenor saxophone, bass clarinet
- Bill Reichenbach Jr. – bass trombone, trombone
- Gary Grant and Jerry Hey – trumpet, flugelhorn

Strings

- Jerry Hey – arrangements (1, 4, 5, 7, 9, 10)
- Alan Broadbent – arrangements (6)
- Murray Adler – concertmaster
- Jodi Burnett, Paula Hochhalter, Raphael Kramer and Fred Seykora – cello
- Steve Gordon, Carol Mukogawa, Simon Oswall and Harry Shirinian – viola
- Murray Adler, Israel Baker, Robert Brosseau, Bonnie Douglas, Juliann French, James Getzoff, Clayton Haslop, Eun Sun Lee, Gordon Marron, Paul Shure, Dorothy Wade and John Wittenberg – violin

=== Production ===
- Dave Grusin – executive producer
- Larry Rosen – executive producer
- Lee Ritenour – producer, additional engineer
- Don Murray – recording, mixing
- Geoff Gillette – additional engineer
- Mike Kloster – second engineer, technical assistant
- Pamela Meadows – executive technical assistant
- Kevin Dixon – additional technical assistant
- Paul May – additional technical assistant
- Robert Vosgien – digital editing at CMS Digital (Pasadena, CA)
- Wally Traugott – mastering at Capitol Studios
- Joseph Doughney, Michael Landy and Adam Zelinka – post-production at The Review Room (New York, NY)
- Michael Pollard – production coordinator
- Doreen Kalcich – production coordination assistant
- Andy Baltimore – creative direction
- Margo Chase – album design
- John Casado – photography

== Charts ==
Chart (1993)	Peak position
Billboard Jazz Albums	1
