= Koinonia (band) =

American Christian jazz band

- 1986 album cover, Frontline

Background information
- Genres: Jazz fusion, jazz-funk, contemporary Christian music
- Years active: 1980–1991
- Past members: Alex Acuña; Abraham Laboriel; Justo Almario; John Phillips; Lou Pardini; Hadley Hockensmith; Dean Parks; Harlan Rogers; Bill Maxwell

Koinonia was a Christian band who perform jazz-funk music.

Though less known in the United States, Koinonia established themselves as a huge sensation in Scandinavia and Western Europe, performing to sell-out crowds from 1982 to 1991 in Norway, Denmark, the Netherlands, Sweden, Finland, Germany, Switzerland and France. Their Latin-infused rhythms and upbeat melodies gave them a distinct and cultured sound. Taken from a Greek word used in the Bible to mean “intimate fellowship”, Koinonia was notably one of the first Christian, though primarily instrumental, jazz bands.

== Original members ==
The original founding members of the band in 1980 were: bassist Abraham Laboriel, Weather Report veteran Alex Acuña on drums and percussion, wind player John Phillips, noted session-guitarist Dean Parks, and three members of Andraé Crouch's band, drummer/percussionist Bill Maxwell, guitarist Hadley Hockensmith, and Harlan Rogers on keyboards. In 1981 the saxophone/clarinet and flute virtuoso Justo Almario replaced John Phillips. Dean Parks also left at that time, because he preferred not to travel. Chester Thompson joined one tour in Europe in 1987, replacing Alex Acuña, but Thompson was never an official member of the band. In 1988, Lou Pardini joined the band on keyboards and vocals. Koinonia disbanded in 1991.

== After Koinonia ==
Each member has gone on to be successful individual and/or studio and session musicians working with many giants of the music industry. Hockensmith has been Neil Diamond’s guitarist for 25 years. Parks, best known for his contributions with Steely Dan and Michael Jackson, is still one of the top studio guitarists in Los Angeles. Acuña is one of the major LA studio film percussionists and tours with his own band. Rogers was part of Ricky Skaggs's band for six years. Lou Pardini has recorded several of his own albums, composing a Grammy-award winning song for Smokey Robinson; he joined the band Chicago in 2009. John Phillips has been out of contact.

As of 2014 Abraham Laboriel, Justo Almario, Bill Maxwell, with the addition of long-time arranger/composer/sessionman, Greg Mathieson, make up the jazz-fusion quartet known as Open Hands, based in Los Angeles.

== Discography ==
Koinonia's albums include:

- 1973: Sonlight (band's self-titled debut before changing name to Koinonia)
- 1982: More than a Feelin'
- 1984: Celebration (Live)
- 1986: Frontline
- 1989: Koinonia
- 1989: Compact Favorites (collection)
- 1992: Pilgrim’s Progression – Best of Koinonia (compilation)
- 2005: Celebrate in Gothenburg (DVD of live concert in 1983)
- 2010: All The Best (compilation of 4 CDs and 2 DVDs)
