= Portrait (Lee Ritenour album) =

Studio album by Lee Ritenour
- Released: 1987
- Recorded: 1987
- Studio: Sunset Sound (Hollywood, CA) Starlight Sound (Burbank, CA) CMS Digital (Pasadena, California)
- Genre: Jazz fusion, smooth jazz
- Length: 45:00
- Language: English, Portuguese
- Label: GRP
- Producer: Lee Ritenour

Lee Ritenour chronology
Earth Run (1986)	Portrait (1987)	Festival (1988)

Portrait is the sixteenth studio album by American jazz guitarist Lee Ritenour, released in 1987 through GRP Records. The album reached No. 7 on the Billboard magazine Contemporary Jazz chart.

== Track listing ==
No.	Title	Writer(s)	Length
1.	"Asa"	Djavan	5:21
2.	"Turn the Heat Up"	Kelly McNulty, Ritenour, Eric Tagg	4:00
3.	"Windmill"	Ritenour, Harvey Mason	4:20
4.	"White Water"	Russell Ferrante	5:04
5.	"Portrait"	Ritenour, Harvey Mason	4:28
6.	"G-Rit"	Ritenour, Kenny G	3:30
7.	"Shades in the Shade"	Ritenour, Tim Landers	4:32
8.	"Children's Games"	Antônio Carlos Jobim	4:20
9.	"Runaway"	Ritenour	4:40
10.	"Route 17"	Richard Bauerle, Russell Ferrante, Jimmy Haslip	4:35

== Personnel ==
- Lee Ritenour – lead guitar (1), electric guitar (2–7), acoustic guitar (3–5, 7, 9), SynthAxe (3, 7, 9), acoustic guitar synthesizer (4, 8, 9)
- Barnaby Finch – MIDI piano (1), keyboards (7)
- Larry Williams – synthesizers (1, 2, 8), tenor saxophone (1, 5), synthesizer programming (2, 3, 5, 9), synth horns (5)
- David Boruff – synthesizer programming (1, 7)
- Greg Phillinganes – keyboards (2, 5, 6)
- Russell Ferrante – keyboards (4, 8–10)
- Djavan – rhythm guitar (1), vocals (1)
- Paul Jackson Jr. – guitars (2), rhythm guitar (3, 5, 6)
- Tim Landers – bass (1, 7)
- Nathan East – bass (2, 3, 5, 6)
- Jimmy Haslip – bass (4, 8–10)
- Vinnie Colaiuta – drums (1–3, 7)
- Will Kennedy – drums (4, 8–10)
- Harvey Mason – drums (5, 6), percussion (5, 6)
- Paulinho da Costa – percussion (1–3, 7)
- Alex Acuña – percussion (4, 10)
- Kenny G – tenor saxophone (6)
- Mark Russo – alto saxophone (9)
- Jerry Hey – trumpet (1, 5), horn and synthesizer arrangements (1, 5)
- Phil Perry – vocals (2), vocal fills (6)
- Eric Tagg – vocals (2)
- Kevyn Lettau – backing vocals (3)

=== Production ===
- Dave Grusin – executive producer
- Larry Rosen – executive producer
- Lee Ritenour – producer, arrangements, additional recording
- Don Murray – co-producer, recording, mixing, liner notes
- Terry Bowen – recording assistant
- Jimmy Preziosi – recording assistant
- Wally Traugott – mastering at Capitol Studios (Hollywood, California)
- Andy Baltimore – creative direction, album design
- David Gibb – album design
- Dave Kunze – album design
- Ivan Salgado – album design
- Dan Serrano – album design
- Glen Wexler – front and back cover photography
- Janet Van Ham – inner sleeve photography

== Charts ==
Chart (1987)	Peak position
Billboard Jazz Albums	7
