= Gypsies (album) =

Studio album by Lalo Schifrin
- Released: 1978
- Recorded: March 27–31, 1978; Studio City, California
- Genre: Jazz, jazz funk
- Length: 40:39
- Label: Tabu; JZ 35436
- Producer: Lalo Schifrin

Lalo Schifrin chronology
Rollercoaster (1977)	Gypsies (1978)	Nunzio (1978)

Gypsies is an album by Argentine composer, pianist and conductor Lalo Schifrin, recorded in 1978 and released on the Tabu label.

== Critical reception ==
Professional ratings
Review scores
Source	Rating
AllMusic	3/5 stars

Newsday called the music "glossy stuff that sounds like a soundtrack in search of a film." The Courier News deemed it "jazz funk fusion."

== Track listing ==
All compositions by Lalo Schifrin

1. "To Cast a Spell" - 5:40
2. "King of Hearts" - 5:14
3. "Moonlight Gypsies" - 4:57
4. "Fortune Tellers" - 4:40
5. "Gauchos" - 5:34
6. "Pampas" - 5:32
7. "Prophecy of Love" - 3:39
8. "Ring Around the Moon" - 5:23

== Personnel ==
- Lalo Schifrin - piano, keyboards, synthesizer, arranger, conductor
- Oscar Brashear, Bobby Bryant - trumpet
- Charles Loper, Lew McCreary - trombone
- Anthony Ortega, Ernie Watts, Don Menza - woodwinds
- Mike Melvoin - keyboards
- Ian Underwood - synthesizer
- Dean Parks - guitar
- Abraham Laboriel - electric bass
- Jim Keltner - drums
- Emil Richards, Paulinho Da Costa - percussion
