= Is It You (Lee Ritenour song) =

Single by Lee Ritenour

from the album Rit
- B-side: "Countdown (Captain Fingers)"
- Released: April 1981
- Genre: Jazz fusion, jazz, adult contemporary
- Label: Elektra
- Songwriters: Lee Ritenour, Eric Tagg, Bill Champlin
- Producers: Lee Ritenour, Harvey Mason, David Foster

Lee Ritenour singles chronology
"Countdown Captain Fingers" (1981)	"Is It You" (1981)	"Cross My Heart" (1982)

Audio
- "Is It You?" on YouTube

"Is It You" is a song by Lee Ritenour from his 1981 LP Rit. Co-written by Ritenour, Bill Champlin, and Eric Tagg who sings lead, it reached number 15 on both the U.S. Billboard Hot 100 and Adult Contemporary charts. It was also a Top 40 hit in Canada. The music video was featured on MTV's first day of broadcast.

== Charts ==
Chart (1981)	Peak position
Canadian RPM Top Singles	35
US Billboard Hot 100	15
US Billboard Adult Contemporary	15
US Billboard Hot Soul Singles	27
US Cash Box Top 100	17

== Cover versions ==
- Thierry Condor covered the song on his 2013 album Stuff Like That.
