= Friendship (Friendship album) =

1979 studio album by Friendship

Studio album by Friendship
- Released: 1979
- Studios: Dawnbreaker Studios, San Fernando, California
- Genre: Jazz fusion
- Length: 38:05
- Labels: Elektra; Asylum Records
- Producers: Lee Ritenour; Don Grusin

Lee Ritenour chronology
Feel the Night (1979)	Friendship (1979)	Rit (1981)

Friendship is the only studio album by the American jazz fusion band Friendship, released in 1979 by Elektra Records. It is best known for its track, "Let's Not Talk About It", written by Don Grusin and Lee Ritenour, which baseline functioned as the inspiration for the underground theme in the 1985 Nintendo game, Super Mario Bros. The other band members were Abraham Laboriel (bass), Alex Acuña (drums), Ernie Watts (saxophones, piccolo), and Steve Foreman (percussion).

== Track listing ==
Side one
No.	Title	Writer(s)	Length
1.	"Bullet Train"	Ernie Watts; Lee Ritenour	5:23
2.	"Tighten Up"	Watts	5:10
3.	"The Situation"	Don Grusin; Ritenour	4:30
4.	"Let's Not Talk About It"	Grusin; Ritenour	4:53

Side two
No.	Title	Writer(s)	Length
1.	"Here Today Hear Tomorrow"	Abraham Laboriel	5:20
2.	"Waterwings"	Grusin	6:53
3.	"The Real Thing"	Grusin	5:56

== Personnel ==
Personnel taken from Friendship liner notes.

Friendship

- Alex Acuña - drums
- Ernie Watts - saxophones, piccolo
- Don Grusin - keyboards
- Abraham Laboriel - bass
- Steve Foreman - percussion
- Lee Ritenour - acoustic guitars, electric guitars

Production

- Don Murray - sound engineering
- Matthew Hyde - additional engineering
- Debbie Thompson - secondary engineering
- Daniel Protheroe - secondary engineering
- Mike Reese - mastering
- Aaron Rapoport - photography
- Ron Coro - art direction
- Kathy Morphesis - art direction
