= Rollercoaster (soundtrack) =

Soundtrack album by Lalo Schifrin
- Released: 1977
- Recorded: April 20, 1977; Hollywood, California
- Genre: Film score
- Length: 39:15
- Label: MCA; MCA 2284
- Producer: Sonny Burke

Lalo Schifrin chronology
Voyage of the Damned (1977)	Rollercoaster (1977)	Gypsies (1978)

Rollercoaster is a soundtrack album to the motion picture of the same name by Argentine composer, pianist and conductor Lalo Schifrin recorded in 1977 and released on the MCA label.

== Reception ==
The Allmusic review states "Since much of Rollercoaster took place at amusement parks, the soundtrack required a complex mix of conventional thriller music and believable source music for the parks' attractions. Thankfully, composer Lalo Schifrin served up a score that managed to deliver on both counts... Fans of Schifrin's funkier work à la Enter the Dragon will also be pleased with the title cut, a barnstorming funk instrumental that layers wild flute and guitar solos over a rumbling bassline. All in all, Rollercoaster lacks the cohesiveness of the best soundtrack albums, but it is a solid showcase for Lalo Schifrin's multifaceted musical skills and is guaranteed to please his fans".

Professional ratings
Review scores
Source	Rating
Allmusic	3/5 stars

== Track listing ==
All compositions by Lalo Schifrin

1. "Prologue, Montage" - 5:28
2. "Magic Carousel" - 2:44
3. "Portrait of Harry" - 2:36
4. "Movement from String Quartette (Young Man's Theme)" - 2:33
5. "Penny Arcade" - 2:25
6. "Cotton Candy" - 2:34
7. "One Track Mind" - 2:17
8. "Merry-Go-Round" - 2:36
9. "Calliope of Death" - 2:06
10. "Rollercoaster" - 4:00
11. "Children's Ride" - 1:52
12. "Another Side of Harry" - 2:25
13. "Apple Turnover" - 3:53
14. "Magic Carousel - End Title" - 1:46

== Personnel ==
- Lalo Schifrin - arranger, conductor
- Clark Spangler, Ralph Grierson, Bill Mays - keyboards
- Dennis Budimer, Lee Ritenour - guitar
- Anthony Jackson - bass
- James Gadson - drums
- The Hollywood Studio Symphony - orchestra
- Sandy DeCrescent - orchestra manager
