= Stolen Moments (Lee Ritenour album) =

Studio album by Lee Ritenour
- Released: 1990
- Recorded: 1990
- Genre: Jazz
- Length: 46:06
- Label: GRP
- Producer: Lee Ritenour

Lee Ritenour chronology
Color Rit (1989)	Stolen Moments (1990)	Collection (1991)

Professional ratings
Review scores
Source	Rating
AllMusic	4/5 stars

Stolen Moments is an album by American guitarist Lee Ritenour released in 1990, recorded for the GRP label. The album reached #3 on Billboard's Jazz chart.

== Track listing ==
1. "Uptown" (Lee Ritenour) - 6:40
2. "Stolen Moments" (Oliver Nelson) - 6:36
3. "24th Street Blues" (Lee Ritenour) - 5:23
4. "Haunted Heart" (Arthur Schwartz, Howard Dietz) - 4:53
5. "Waltz for Carmen" (Lee Ritenour, Mitch Holder) - 6:23
6. "St. Bart's" (Lee Ritenour) - 4:06
7. "Blue in Green" (Miles Davis) - 8:00
8. "Sometime Ago" (Sergio Mihanovich) - 4:05

== Personnel ==
Musicians

- Lee Ritenour – Gibson L5 electric guitar
- John Pattitucci – acoustic bass
- Harvey Mason – drums
- Ernie Watts – tenor saxophone (1–3, 5–8)
- Mitch Holder – acoustic guitar (5–6)
- Alan Broadbent – acoustic piano, Roland Fender Rhodes (6)

Production

- Dave Grusin – GRP executive producer
- Larry Rosen – GRP executive producer
- Hiroshi Aono – JVC executive producer
- Takashi Misu – JVC executive producer
- Lee Ritenour – producer, arrangements
- Don Murray – engineer, mixing
- Mike Kloster – recording assistant
- Robert Vosgien – digital editing at CMS Digital (Pasadena, California)
- Wally Traugott – mastering at Capitol Studios (Hollywood, California)
- Andy Baltimore – creative direction
- David Gibb – graphic design
- Jacki McCarthy – graphic design
- Andy Ruggirello – graphic design
- Dan Serrano – graphic design
- Susan Silton – cover design
- Hiedo Oida – all photography
- Max Fields – wardrobe
- Leonard Feather – liner notes

== Charts ==
Chart (2016)	Peak position
US Traditional Jazz Albums (Billboard)	3
