= Justo Almario =

Colombian musician

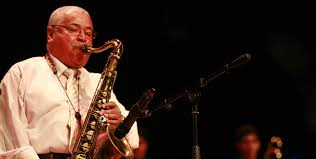
Justo Almario

Justo Pastor Almario Gómez (born 18 February 1949) is a Colombian-American flutist, saxophonist and Latin jazz group leader. He was among several Colombian musicians recruited by Mongo Santamaria for his band in the 1970s, notably on the album, Afro–Indio (1975). He is based in Los Angeles.

== Background ==
Born in Sincelejo and raised in Medellín, Almario comes from a family musical tradition, dedicated since childhood to playing woodwind instruments.

He started playing his father's drums, the conga drums. Many musicians came in and out of his home at a young age. Constantly surrounded by the sound of different instruments, he started to learn himself. At the age of four years old, he received two instruments: a piccolo and a short clarinet, in the key of E flat, so his fingers would reach. Since then, he always had a dream of being a musician.

Justo Almario grew up during the glory days of Colombian music, with the big bands led by Lucho Bermúdez. Almario is related to Lucho Bermúdez (not by blood, but still family). When his mother heard that he really liked music she sent him to study with one of the family friends (that) already lived in Barranquilla, and that friend was the uncle of Lucho Bermúdez.

He studied at the prestigious Berklee College of Music in Boston, Massachusetts. When he was finishing his college education, Almario received a call from Mongo Santamaría to come and join his band. Mongo Santamaría was living in New York at that time. In Boston, they had a very important jazz club called the Jazz Workshop. And they would bring bands, all the famous bands, Miles Davis, Thelonious Monk, the Jazz Messengers, Mongo Santamaría and his band, to play at the Jazz Workshop, and they would stay there for a whole week, Tuesday to Sundays. He received a call from Santamaria, who sought an alto saxophone for the Jazz Workshop Boston "presentaciónen 71".

After touring with Mongo Santamaría as musical director, Almario came to Los Angeles to record and tour with Roy Ayers's ubiquity. Since then, his saxophone, flute, and clarinet performances have appeared on hundreds of recordings by artists that include the Commodores, Freddie Hubbard, Jennifer Lopez, the Winans, Patrice Rushen, Luis Miguel, Charles Mingus, Chaka Khan, and Cachao and on the scores of films like Dirty Dancing, Happy Feet, Rio, and Sideways.

Moreover, Almario accompanied Jon Lucien, Frank Foster, Freddie Hubbard and Willie Bobo. He also played in the group Koinonia with guests including Machito, Tito Puente, Cal Tjader and Poncho Sánchez.

== Discography ==
- 1981 Interlude (Uno Melodic)
- 1985 Forever Friends (Meadowlark)
- 1987 Plumbline (Meadowlark)
- 1989 Family Time (MCA)
- 1990 Heritage (Bluemoon)
- 1995 Count Me In (Integrity)
- 1995 Justo Almario & Abraham Laboriel (Integrity)
- 2004 Love Thy Neighbor (Echo Music)

=== with Koinonia (band) ===
- 1982 More than a Feelin' (Sparrow)
- 1984 Celebration (Live) (Breaker)
- 1986 Frontline (Sparrow)
- 1989 Koinonia (Royal)

=== with Marcos Ariel ===
- 1990 Rhapsody in Rio (Nova)
- 1998 Soul Song (Tonga)

=== with Alex Acuña ===
- 1998 Tolú: Rumbero's Poetry (Tonga)
- 2002 Tolú: Bongó De Van Gogh (Tonga)
