= O Dia em que a Terra Parou =

Studio album by Raul Seixas
- Released: 1977
- Genre: Rock
- Length: 34:40
- Label: WEA
- Producer: Marco Mazzola

Raul Seixas chronology
| Raul Rock Seixas (1977) | O Dia em que a Terra Parou (1977) | Mata Virgem (1978) |

O Dia em que a Terra Parou (transl. The Day the Earth Stood Still) is the fifth solo studio album by the Brazilian musician Raul Seixas. It was released in 1977 by the newly founded record label WEA. The song 'Que luz é essa' became popular on TikTok along with the caption "me as a baby".

== Track listing ==
All tracks are written by Cláudio Roberto and Raul Seixas.

| No. | Title | English title | Length |
|---|---|---|---|
| 1. | "Tapanacara" (featuring Banda Black Rio) | Slapintheface | 3:08 |
| 2. | "Maluco Beleza" | Cool Crazy | 3:25 |
| 3. | "O Dia em que a Terra Parou" | The Day the Earth Stood Still | 4:25 |
| 4. | "No Fundo do Quintal da Escola" | In the School's Backyard | 3:00 |
| 5. | "Eu Quero Mesmo" | I Really Wanna | 2:38 |
| 6. | "Sapato 36" | Size 4 Shoe | 2:38 |
| 7. | "Você" | You | 3:11 |
| 8. | "Sim" | Yes | 3:28 |
| 9. | "Que Luz É Essa?" (featuring Gilberto Gil) | What Is This Light? | 2:46 |
| 10. | "De Cabeça pra Baixo" | Upside Down | 2:36 |
