= Carol Rogers (singer) =

- Origin: Omaha, Nebraska, U.S.
- Occupation: Singer
- Years active: 1974–present

Carol Jean Rogers is an American singer and vocal coach. She is famous for her work with Brazilian artists such as Sergio Mendes, Gilberto Gil, and Jorge Ben Jor. A longtime collaborator of Mendes, she has performed with him for several decades, including on Brasileiro, which won the 1993 Grammy Award for Best World Music Album. She also leads her own band, Mama O.

== Biography ==
Rogers was raised in Omaha, Nebraska in a musical family who often hosted parties with live music at their home. She graduated from Omaha Central High School and attended the University of Nebraska–Lincoln, but would later begin to focus on her musical career. She began performing on Omaha's first Black-owned radio station, KOWH. She would go on to audition for Stevie Wonder in California, but was rejected. She later moved back to Omaha, but moved back again to California to audition for who she initially thought was Trini Lopez, but later discovered to be Mendes.

She moved to and lived in Brazil while she performed with various artists. Rogers provided the vocals to various albums of Mendes, including Brasil '88 and Brasileiro, which won the 1993 Grammy for Best World Music Album. She also wrote the lyrics to and helped compose a number of songs on Gilberto Gil's 1979 album Nightingale, including Ella and Alapalá - The Myth Of Shango. The latter incorporates Afro-Brazilian and Afro-Bahian themes.

Rogers has also collaborated with Yasuko Agawa on her 1988 album Ouro de Manaus. She later collaborated with Monica Dominique, culminating in their 1997 album So Nice. She later toured extensively with Mendes around the world and performed for various artists, including Wonder, John Travolta, and Bruce Springsteen. She has also provided vocals for the soundtrack in movies such as Antitrust and Bossa Nova, as well as for the 2001 Teen Choice Awards and the educational game Wally's World.

Rogers performs with her own group, Mama O. She also provides vocal coaching and courses for students in various countries, having also recorded, with Warner Brothers, the instructional video Blues Vocals. She trained with Sandy & Junior on singing in English.

She moved back to Omaha in 2013 to provide care for her mother, pianist and singer Jeanne Rogers.

Rogers is an inductee to the Omaha Black Music Hall of Fame.

== Discography ==
- Carol Rogers Sings Everything (1974)
- So Nice (1997)
