= Vítor Martins =

Brazilian songwriter

Vítor Martins (born October 22, 1944) is a Brazilian songwriter, known for several hits in Brazil and internationally. Most of these were composed with Ivan Lins (born 1945), with whom Martins began working in the early 1970s. Together, they founded the national record company Velas in 1991.

== Compositions ==
These compositions are with Ivan Lins unless noted. Some of these have English translations, and been recorded and published with various artists internationally.

- Abre alas
- Açucena
- Água doce
- Ai, ai, ai, ai, ai
- Amar assim
- Andorinhas
- Anjo de mim
- Aos nossos filhos (alone)
- Arlequim desconhecido
- Atrevida (alone)
- Bandeira do Divino
- Barco fantasma
- Bilhete
- Cartomante
- Choro das águas
- Clareou (with Ivan Lins and Aldir Blanc)
- Começar de novo
- Daquilo que eu sei
- De Nosso Amor Tão Sincero (alone)
- Depende de Nós
- Desesperar, jamais
- 16 de novembro
- Dinorah, Dinorah
- Formigueiro (with Ivan Lins, and Tim Maia)
- Novo tempo
- O Assalto (alone)
- Sede dos marujos
- Setembro with Lins and Gilson Peranzzetta
- Velas içadas
- Vitoriosa
