= Eric Tagg =

American musician (born 1953)

- Born: January 9, 1953 (age 73); Lincoln, Illinois, U.S.
- Origin: Los Angeles, California, U.S.
- Genres: R&B; pop-rock; soul; soft rock; smooth jazz
- Occupations: Singer-songwriter, musician
- Instruments: Vocals, bass guitar, keyboards, dulcimer, flute
- Years active: 1971 – present
- Labels: Elektra, EMI

Eric Tagg (born January 9, 1953) is an American singer, songwriter and musician. He was previously a member of Dutch music groups Beehive and Rainbow Train. He is also notable for being the songwriter, bassist and vocalist in guitarist Lee Ritenour’s band. He is the younger brother of musician Larry Tagg.

== Discography ==
=== Studio albums ===
Year	Album	Label
1975	Smilin' Memories	EMI
1977	Rendez Vous	Poker
1982	Dreamwalkin'	Pony Canyon
1987	Turn The Heat Up	Portrait
1997	Through My Eyes	ID Net
2010	Time For a Miracle	Sympathetic Music
2018	Tagg/McNulty Live	Sympathetic Music

=== Singles ===
- 1975 - "A Fantasy"
- 1977 - "Fancy Meeting You"
- 1982 - "Keep It Alive" / "Tied Up"
- 1981 - "Is It You"
- 1981 - "Mr. Briefcase"
- 1982 - "No One There"
- 1986 - "Woman I Love"
- 1984 - "Round The Corner"
- 1987 - "Turn The Heat Up"
- 1989 - "We're At The Crossroads"
- 1997 - "Never Too Far"
- 2007 - "My Little Ones"
- 2010 - "Another Waste of Time"

=== Appears on ===
Year	Album	Artist	Label
1978	Medusa	Medusa	Columbia
1981	Rit	Lee Ritenour	Elektra
1982	Rit/2	Lee Ritenour	Elektra
1983	Painted Woman	Masaki Matsubara	Canyon
1984	Banded Together	Lee Ritenour	Elektra
1987	Portrait	Lee Ritenour	Elektra
