= Don Grusin =

American jazz musician and record producer

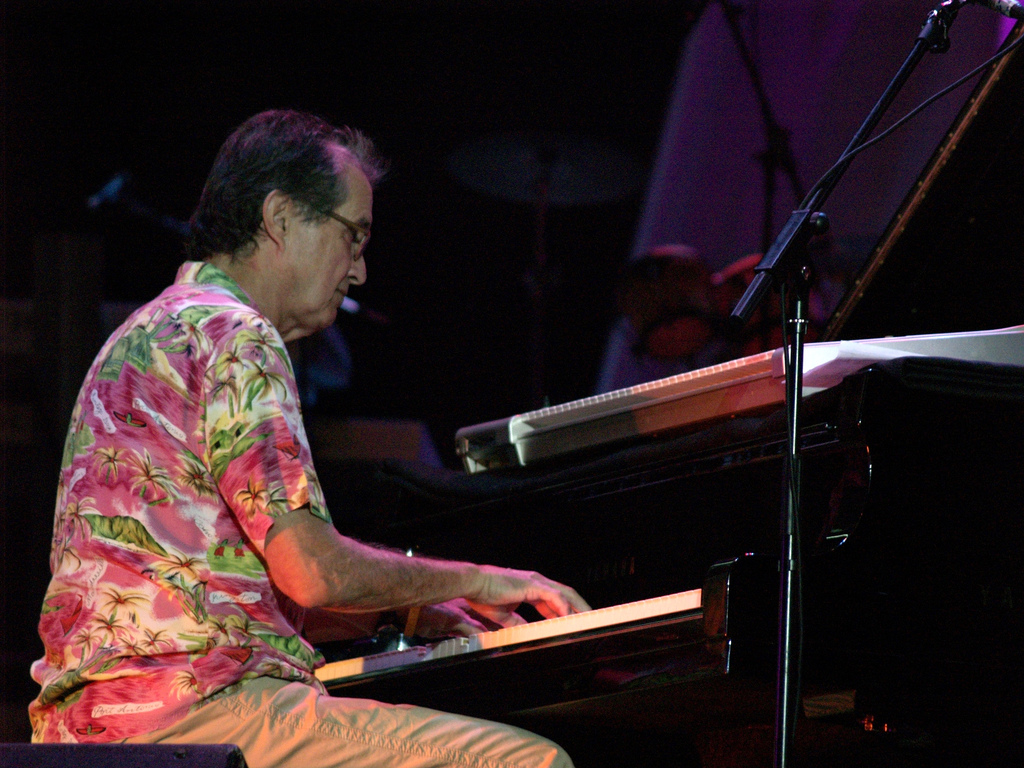
- Photo by Ryan San
- Born: Donald Henri Grusin; April 22, 1941 (age 85); Littleton, Colorado, U.S.
- Relatives: Dave Grusin
- Musical career
- Genres: Jazz, Latin jazz, pop
- Occupations: Musician, composer
- Instrument: Keyboards
- Years active: 1975–present
- Labels: JVC, GRP
- Website: www.dongrusin.com

Donald Henri Grusin (born April 22, 1941) is an American jazz keyboardist, composer, and record producer. He is the younger brother of Dave Grusin.

== Career ==
Don Grusin grew up in Littleton, Colorado. His father, a native of Latvia, was a classical violinist. His brother, Dave Grusin, is a pianist, record producer, and co-founder of GRP Records.

Grusin graduated from the University of Colorado Boulder with a bachelor's degree in sociology and a master's degree in economics. In the early 1970s, he was an economics professor in Guadalajara, Mexico. Soon after, he taught economics at Foothill College in California.

Grusin performed in Bogotá, Colombia, as a member of Azteca, a Latin jazz fusion band led by Pete Escovedo that included Escovedo's daughter, drummer Sheila E. The trip sparked a lifelong interest in Latin music. In 1975, Quincy Jones invited him to tour with his band, and Grusin was persuaded to leave teaching for a career in music. He worked as a studio musician on albums by Randy Crawford, Billy Eckstine, Joe Pass, and the Pointer Sisters. He formed the fusion group Friendship with Lee Ritenour, Ernie Watts, and Alex Acuña and recorded one album, then released solo albums in 1981 and 1983. In 1985, he produced the album Musician for Ernie Watts, and it won a Grammy Award. Grusin's live album The Hang (Sovereign Artists, 2004) received a Grammy Award nomination, and he won Grammy Awards for his work on two albums by the Paul Winter Consort. He won an Echo Award for the album Quality Time, recorded with Peter Fessler.

As a record producer or keyboardist, Grusin has worked with Gerald Albright, Patti Austin, David Benoit, Larry Carlton, Oscar Castro-Neves, Dori Caymmi, Gilberto Gil, Jim Hall, Sérgio Mendes, Airto Moreira, Milton Nascimento, Flora Purim, Nelson Rangell, Brenda Russell, Zoot Sims, Leon Ware, and Sadao Watanabe.

== Discography ==
=== As leader ===
- 10k–LA (JVC, 1981)
- Don Grusin (JVC, 1983)
- Sticks and Stones (GRP, 1988)
- Raven (GRP, 1990)
- Zephyr (GRP, 1991)
- No Borders (GRP, 1992)
- Native Land (GRP, 1993)
- Banana Fish (GRP, 1994)
- Laguna Cove (Don Grusin Music, 1998)
- Traveling Fancy (Floreria/Nippon Crown, 2004)
- The Hang (Sovereign, 2004)
- Better Than Christmas with Natali Rene (Nati, 2004)
- Old Friends and Relatives (Video Arts Music, 2005)
- Geography with Bill Sharpe (JVC, 2006)
- Piano in Venice (JVC, 2008)
- One Night Only with Dave Grusin (CARE Music Group, 2011)
- Trans Atlántica with Bill Sharpe (Universal Music of Japan, 2012)
- Quality Time with Peter Fessler (CARE, 2013)
- Out of Thin Air (Octave Records, 2020)
- Old Times (2025)

=== As sideman ===
With Ernie Watts

- Musician (Qwest, 1985)
- Sanctuary (Qwest, 1986)

With Oscar Castro-Neves

- Maracuja (JVC, 1989)
- Tropical Heart (JVC, 1993)
- All One (Mack Avenue, 2006)

With Dori Caymmi

- Dori Caymmi (Elektra, 1988)
- Brazilian Serenata (Qwest, 1991)
- Kicking Cans (Qwest, 1993)

With Ricardo Silveira

- Sky Light (Verve, 1989)
- Amazon Secrets (Verve, 1990)

With Sadao Watanabe

- Maisha (Elektra, 1985)
- Sweet Deal (Elektra, 1991)

With Eric Marienthal

- Round Trip (GRP, 1989)
- Easy Street (Verve/Polygram, 1997)

With Tom Browne

- Browne Sugar (Arista/GRP, 1985)
- Funkin' for Jamaica (Phantom Sound & Vision, 2002)

With Lorraine Feather

- The Body Remembers (Bean Bag, 1997)
- Cafe Society (Sanctuary, 2003)

With Shakatak

- Full Circle (Inside Out Music, 1994)
- Across the World (Secret, 2011)

With others

- I Never Was a Cowboy, Kenji Omura and Kazumi Watanabe (Alfa, 1978)
- Momento Brasileiro, Billy Eckstine (Som Livre, 1979)
- Friendship (Elektra, 1979)
- Feel the Night, Lee Ritenour (Elektra, 1979)
- Nightingale, Gilberto Gil (WEA International, 1979)
- Whistling Midgets, Dan Dean and Tom Collier (Inner City, 1981)
- 4x4, Casiopea (1982)
- Champion, Tom Jans (Pony Canyon, 1982)
- Maybe, Yasuko Agawa (JVC, 1983)
- Two Eyes, Brenda Russell (Warner Bros., 1983)
- TV, Mari Nakamoto (JVC, 1984)
- Whitestone, Joe Pass (Pablo, 1985)
- Yauaretê, Milton Nascimento (Columbia, 1987)
- Vício, Simone (Columbia Brasil, 1987)
- Wait for Me, Kate Markowitz and Christine Trulio (Pony Canyon, 1989)
- Urban Daydreams, David Benoit (GRP, 1989)
- Love Is Gonna Getcha, Patti Austin (GRP, 1990)
- Dear Friends, Abraham Laboriel (Mesa/Bluemoon, 1993)
- Forbidden Fruit, Marion Meadows (Novus, 1994)
- Moments, Hiroko Kokubu (JVC, 1995)
- Ratamacue, Harvey Mason (Atlantic, 1996)
- Here in My Heart, Kenny Rankin (Private Music, 1997)
- State of the Heart, Bill Sharpe (Instinct, 1998)
- Tocando Tierra, Frank Quintero (Latin World Entertainment Group, 1999)
- Princess T, Naoko Terai (Video Arts Music, 2000)
- Speak No Evil, Flora Purim (Narada, 2003)
- 30 Miles, Natali Rene (Nati, 2006)
