= Abraham Laboriel =

Mexican-American bassist (born 1947)

Abraham Laboriel Sr.
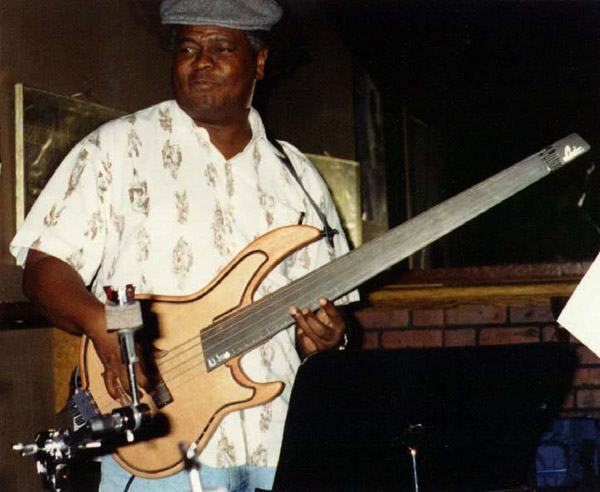
- Laboriel performing in 1994

Background information
- Born: Abraham Laboriel López; July 17, 1947 (age 79); Mexico City, Mexico
- Occupation: Musician
- Instrument: Bass guitar

Abraham Laboriel López (born July 17, 1947) is a Mexican bassist who has played on over 4,000 recordings and soundtracks. Guitar Player magazine called him "the most widely used session bassist of our time". Laboriel is the father of drummer Abe Laboriel Jr. and of producer, songwriter, and film composer Mateo Laboriel.

== Early life, family and education ==
Laboriel was born in Mexico City. His brother was Mexican rock singer Johnny Laboriel, and his sister is Mexican singer, film and television actress Ella Laboriel. Their parents were Garifuna immigrants from Honduras. The family was devoutly Catholic. His father Juan José Laboriel started as a cab driver, but in the 1920s became an integral part of the entertainment business in Mexico as a founding member workers' associations for actors and other professionals.

Abraham received classical training as a guitarist, but he switched to bass guitar while studying at the Berklee College of Music, graduating in 1972. During this time, he learned the importance of versatility as a musician.

== Career ==
Henry Mancini encouraged Laboriel to move to Los Angeles, California, to pursue a recording career, which he did in 1976. He struggled to find work for two years, before finding his first gig on a road tour with Olivia Newton-John. After a consequent European tour with Al Jarreau, Laboriel settled into a full-time studio career in Los Angeles.

Laboriel has also worked with Alan Silvestri, Alvaro Lopez and Res-Q Band, Alvin Slaughter, Andraé Crouch, Andy Pratt, Andy Summers, Barbra Streisand, Billy Cobham, Chris Isaak, Christopher Cross, Crystal Lewis, Dave Grusin, DeBarge, Djavan, Dolly Parton, Don Felder, Don Moen, Donald Fagen, Dori Caymmi, Elton John, Engelbert Humperdinck, Freddie Hubbard, George Benson, Hanson, Herb Alpert, Herbie Hancock, Johnny Hallyday, Keith Green, Kelly Willard, Lalo Schifrin, Larry Carlton, Lee Ritenour, Leo Sayer, Lisa Loeb, Luis Miguel, Madonna, Michael Jackson, Nathan Davis, Paul Jackson Jr., Paul Simon, Phil Driscoll, Quincy Jones, Randy Crawford, Ray Charles, Ron Kenoly, Russ Taff, Stevie Wonder, Jimmy Smith, Umberto Tozzi and Yumi Matsutoya.

Laboriel was a founding member of the bands Friendship and Koinonia. With the latter, he recorded four albums.

In addition, he has recorded several solo albums on which he recruited a cast of musicians that included Alex Acuña, Al Jarreau, Jim Keltner, Phillip Bailey, Ron Kenoly, and others. His son Abe Laboriel Jr., longtime drummer for Sir Paul McCartney, has played on some of the recordings.

Laboriel is member of the band Open Hands with Justo Almario, Greg Mathieson, and Bill Maxwell.

== Honors and awards ==
In 2005, Abraham was awarded an Honorary Doctorate of Music by the Berklee College of Music, his alma mater.

He is ranked No. 42 on Bass Player magazine's list of "The 100 Greatest Bass Players of All Time".

== Discography (partial) ==
- 1993 Dear Friends
- 1994 Guidum
- 1995 Justo Almario & Abraham Laboriel
- 2001 Laboriel Mathieson
- 2005 Live in Switzerland

=== with Friendship ===
With Lee Ritenour, Alex Acuña, Don Grusin, Ernie Watts and Steve Forman

- 1979Friendship (Elektra)

=== with Koinonia (band) ===
- 1983 More Than a Feelin'
- 1984 Celebration
- 1986 Frontline
- 1989 Koinonia

=== As sideman ===
with Justo Almario

- 1987 Plumbline (Meadowlark/Sparrow)
- 1995 Count Me In

with George Benson

- 1980 Give Me the Night (Warner Bros.)
- 1988 Twice the Love (Warner Bros.)
- 1993 Love Remembers (Warner Bros.)

with George Cables

- Shared Secrets (MuseFX, 2001)

with Larry Carlton

- 1983 Friends (Warner Bros.)
- 1986 Alone / But Never Alone (MCA)

with Andraé Crouch

- 1979 I'll Be Thinking Of You (Light Records)
- 1981 Don't Give Up (Warner Bros.)
- 1994 Mercy (Qwest)
- 2006 Mighty Wind

with Phil Driscoll

- 1987 Make Us One (Compose)
- 1992 The Picture Changes (Mighty Horn)
- 1994 Selah I
- 1996 Selah II
- 1997 Live with Friends
- 1997 Live Praise and Worship
- 1999 The Quiet (Mighty Horn)
- 2000 Plugged In (Mighty Horn)

with Michael Giacchino

- 2004 The Incredibles (Walt Disney)
- 2007 Ratatouille (Walt Disney)
- 2015 Inside Out (Walt Disney)
- 2016 Zootopia (Walt Disney)
- 2018 Incredibles 2 (Walt Disney)

with Dave Grusin

- 1982 Tootsie (Warner Bros.)
- 1985 Harlequin (GRP)
- 1985 GRP Live in Session (GRP)
- 1987 Cinemagic (GRP)

with Al Jarreau

- 1977 Look to the Rainbow (Warner Bros.)
- 1980 This Time (Warner Bros.)
- 1981 Breakin' Away (Warner Bros.)
- 1983 Jarreau (Warner Bros.)
- 1988 Heart's Horizon (Reprise)

with Ron Kenoly

- 1991 Jesus Is Alive (Integrity)
- 1992 Lift Him Up (Integrity)
- 1994 God Is Able (Integrity)
- 1995 Sing Out With One Voice (Integrity)
- 1996 Welcome Home (Integrity)
- 1998 Majesty (Integrity)
- 1999 We Offer Praises (Integrity)

with Henry Mancini

- 1975 Symphonic Soul (RCA)
- 1976 The Cop Show Themes (RCA)

with Don Moen

- 1990 Eternal God (Integrity)
- 1992 Worship with Don Moen (Integrity)
- 1994 Trust in the Lord (Integrity)
- 1995 Rivers of Joy (Integrity)
- 1997 Let Your Glory Fall (Integrity)
- 1998 God Is Good (Integrity)
- 2000 The Mercy Seat (Integrity)
- 2000 Heal Our Land (Integrity)

with Al Jarreau and George Benson

- 2006 Givin' It Up (Concord Records)

with Lee Ritenour

- 1978 The Captain's Journey (Elektra)
- 1979 Feel the Night (Elektra)
- 1981 RIT (Elektra/Asylum)
- 1986 Earth Run (GRP Records)

with others

- 1973 Gary Burton, The New Quartet (ECM)
- 1976 Nathan Davis, If (Tomorrow International)
- 1977 Leo Sayer, Thunder in My Heart (Chrysalis Records)
- 1977 Jimmy Smith, Sit on it (Mercury)
- 1977 David "Fathead" Newman, Concrete Jungle (Prestige)
- 1978 Keith Green, No Compromise
- 1978 Kelly Willard, Blame It On The One I Love (Maranatha!)
- 1978 Lalo Schifrin, Gypsies (Tabu)
- 1978 Second Chapter of Acts, Mansion Builder (Sparrow)
- 1978 Stan Getz, Children of the World (Columbia)
- 1978 Stephen Bishop, Bish
- 1979 Marlena Shaw, Acting Up (Columbia Records, 1979)
- 1979 Peter Allen, I Could Have Been a Sailor
- 1979 Dolly Parton, Great Balls of Fire
- 1979 Herb Alpert, Rise (A&M)
- 1979 Randy Crawford, Raw Silk
- 1979 Marc Jordan, Blue Desert (Warner Bros.)
- 1979 Leonard Cohen, Recent Songs (Columbia Records)
- 1979 Joe Sample, Carmel (ABC)
- 1979 Paul Clark, Aim for the Heart (Myrrh)
- 1979 Billy Preston and Syreeta Wright, Music from the Motion Picture 'Fast Break' (Motown)
- 1979 Jennifer Warnes, Shot Through the Heart (Arista Records)
- 1980 Dolly Parton, 9 to 5 and Odd Jobs (RCA)
- 1980 Minnie Riperton, Love Lives Forever (Capitol Records)
- 1980 Barry Manilow, Barry (Arista Records)
- 1980 Randy Crawford, Now We May Begin (Warner Bros. Records)
- 1981 Quincy Jones, The Dude (A&M)
- 1981 The Manhattan Transfer, Mecca for Moderns (Atlantic)
- 1981 Brenda Russell, Love Life
- 1981 Aretha Franklin, Love All the Hurt Away (Arista Records)
- 1981 Chaka Khan, What Cha' Gonna Do for Me (Warner Bros. Records)
- 1981 Randy Crawford, Secret Combination (Warner Bros. Records)
- 1981 Kenny Rogers, Share Your Love (Liberty)
- 1981 Billy Preston, The Way I Am (Motown)
- 1982 Herbie Hancock, Lite Me Up (CBS)
- 1982 Maria Muldaur, There Is a Love (Myrrh Records)
- 1982 Randy Crawford, Windsong (Warner Bros. Records)
- 1982 Melissa Manchester, Hey Ricky (Arista Records)
- 1982 Donald Fagen, The Nightfly (Warner Bros. Records)
- 1982 Jeffrey Osborne, Jeffrey Osborne (A&M Records)
- 1982 Dionne Warwick, Friends in Love (Arista Records)
- 1982 Leo Sayer, World Radio (Chrysalis Records)
- 1982 Kenny Loggins, High Adventure (Columbia Records)
- 1982 Dolly Parton, Heartbreak Express (RCA Records)
- 1983 Peabo Bryson and Roberta Flack, Born to Love (Capitol Records)
- 1983 Randy Crawford, Nightline (Warner Bros. Records)
- 1983 Maria Muldaur, Sweet and Slow
- 1983 Dionne Warwick, How Many Times Can We Say Goodbye (Arista Records)
- 1983 Christopher Cross, Another Page (Warner Bros. Records)
- 1983 Melissa Manchester, Emergency (Arista Records)
- 1983 Teena Marie, Robbery
- 1983 Lionel Richie, Can't Slow Down (Motown)
- 1983 Jeffrey Osborne, Stay With Me Tonight (A&M Records)
- 1984 Barbra Streisand, Emotion (Columbia Records)
- 1984 Jeffrey Osborne, Don't Stop (A&M Records)
- 1984 Philip Bailey, The Wonders of His Love (Myrrh Records)
- 1984 Sheena Easton, A Private Heaven (EMI)
- 1985 DeBarge, Rhythm of the Night (Gordy)
- 1985 Diane Schuur, Schuur Thing (GPR)
- 1985 Patti Austin, Gettin' Away with Murder (Qwest Records)
- 1985 Olivia Newton-John, Soul Kiss (MCA Records)
- 1985 Jennifer Holliday, Say You Love Me
- 1985 Stephanie Mills, Stephanie Mills (MCA Records)
- 1985 Stephen Bishop, Sleeping with Girls (Big Pink)
- 1986 José Feliciano, Te Amaré (RCA International)
- 1986 Kenny Rogers, They Don't Make Them Like They Used To (MCA Records)
- 1986 Teena Marie, Emerald City
- 1987 David Benoit, Freedom at Midnight (GRP)
- 1987 Joan Baez, Recently (Gold Castle)
- 1987 Robbie Robertson, Robbie Robertson
- 1987 Dolly Parton, Rainbow
- 1987 Natalie Cole, Everlasting (EMI)
- 1988 Olivia Newton-John, The Rumour (MCA Records)
- 1988 Jeffrey Osborne, One Love: One Dream (MCA Records)
- 1989 Greg Mathieson For My Friends
- 1989 Joan Baez, Speaking of Dreams (Gold Castle)
- 1990 Twila Paris, Cry for the Desert (EMI CMG)
- 1990 John Denver, Earth Songs
- 1990 Teddy Pendergrass, Truly Blessed
- 1990 Randy Rothwell, Worship The King (Integrity)
- 1990 Michael McDonald, Take It to Heart (Reprise Records)
- 1991 Bob Fitts, The Highest Place (Integrity)
- 1991 Graham Kendrick, Crown Him (Integrity)
- 1991 Lenny LeBlanc, Pure Heart (Integrity)
- 1991 Marty Nystrom, Come To The Table (Integrity)
- 1991 Paul Wilbur, Up To Zion (Integrity)
- 1991 Curtis Stigers, Curtis Stigers
- 1991 Michael Jackson, Dangerous (Epic)
- 1991 Desmond Child, Discipline
- 1992 Bob Kauflin, Chosen Treasure (Integrity)
- 1992 Mark Conner, All Nations Worship (Integrity)
- 1992 Rich Gomez, Almighty (Integrity)
- 1992 Rusty Nelson, Take the City (Integrity)
- 1992 Chaka Khan, The Woman I Am (Warner Bros. Records)
- 1992 Michel Jonasz, Où est la source (Warner Bros. Records)
- 1993 Helen Baylor, Start All Over
- 1993 Lionel Peterson, Rejoice Africa (Integrity)
- 1993 Randy Rothwell, Be Magnified (Integrity)
- 1993 Brenda Russell, Soul Talkin' (EMI)
- 1993 Tom Inglis, We Are One (Integrity)
- 1993 Notenstock, Live in Vienne 1993 (Lazer Production)
- 1993 Randy Crawford, Don't Say It's Over
- 1993 Barbra Streisand, Back to Broadway (Columbia Records)
- 1994 Rick & Cathy Riso, As for My House (Integrity)
- 1994 Joe Cocker, Have a Little Faith (Capitol Records)
- 1995 Jennifer Rush, Out of My Hands (EMI)
- 1995 Bette Midler, Bette of Roses (Atlantic Records)
- 1996 Ricardo Arjona, Si El Norte Fuera El Sur
- 1996 Alvin Slaughter, God Can! (Integrity)
- 1997 Lou Pardini, Night to Remember
- 1997 Angelica, Angelica
- 1999 Clint Black, D'lectrified
- 2000 Paul Simon, You're the One (Warner Bros.)
- 2000 Bette Midler, Bette
- 2000 k.d. lang, Invincible Summer (Warner Bros. Records)
- 2001 Jennifer Warnes, The Well (Music Force)
- 2001 Alan Silvestri, The Mexican (Decca)
- 2002 3Prime, 3Prime (Fuzzy Music)
- 2002 LeAnn Rimes, Twisted Angel (Curb Records)
- 2003 Diane Schuur, Midnight (Concord Records)
- 2004 Don Grusin, The Hang
- 2004 Clint Black, Spend My Time
- 2004 Clint Black, Christmas with You
- 2004 Michael McDonald, Motown Two
- 2005 Rob Thomas, ...Something More
- 2006 Paul Simon, Surprise (Warner Bros. Records)
- 2007 Clint Black, The Love Songs
- 2007 Alison Krauss, A Hundred Miles or More: A Collection (Rounder)
- 2008 Chris Boardman, Midtown Moves (Ambient Entertainment)
- 2008 Karen Blixt, Mad Hope (HiFli)
- 2009 Tom Brooks, Hymns of Peace (Worship Alliance/3:16 Media)
- 2009 Patrizio Buanne, Patrizio (Warner Bros. Records)
- 2013 Christophe Beck, Frozen (Walt Disney)
- 2014 Ziggy Marley, Fly Rasta (Tuff Gong Worldwide)
- 2015 Melissa Manchester, You Gotta Love the Life (L. L. C.)
- 2016 Ziggy Marley, Ziggy Marley (Tuff Gong Worldwide)
- 2018 Jennifer Warnes, Another Time, Another Place (BMG)
- 2019 Don Felder, American Rock 'n' Roll
