= Ernie Watts =

American jazz and R&B saxophonist (born 1945)

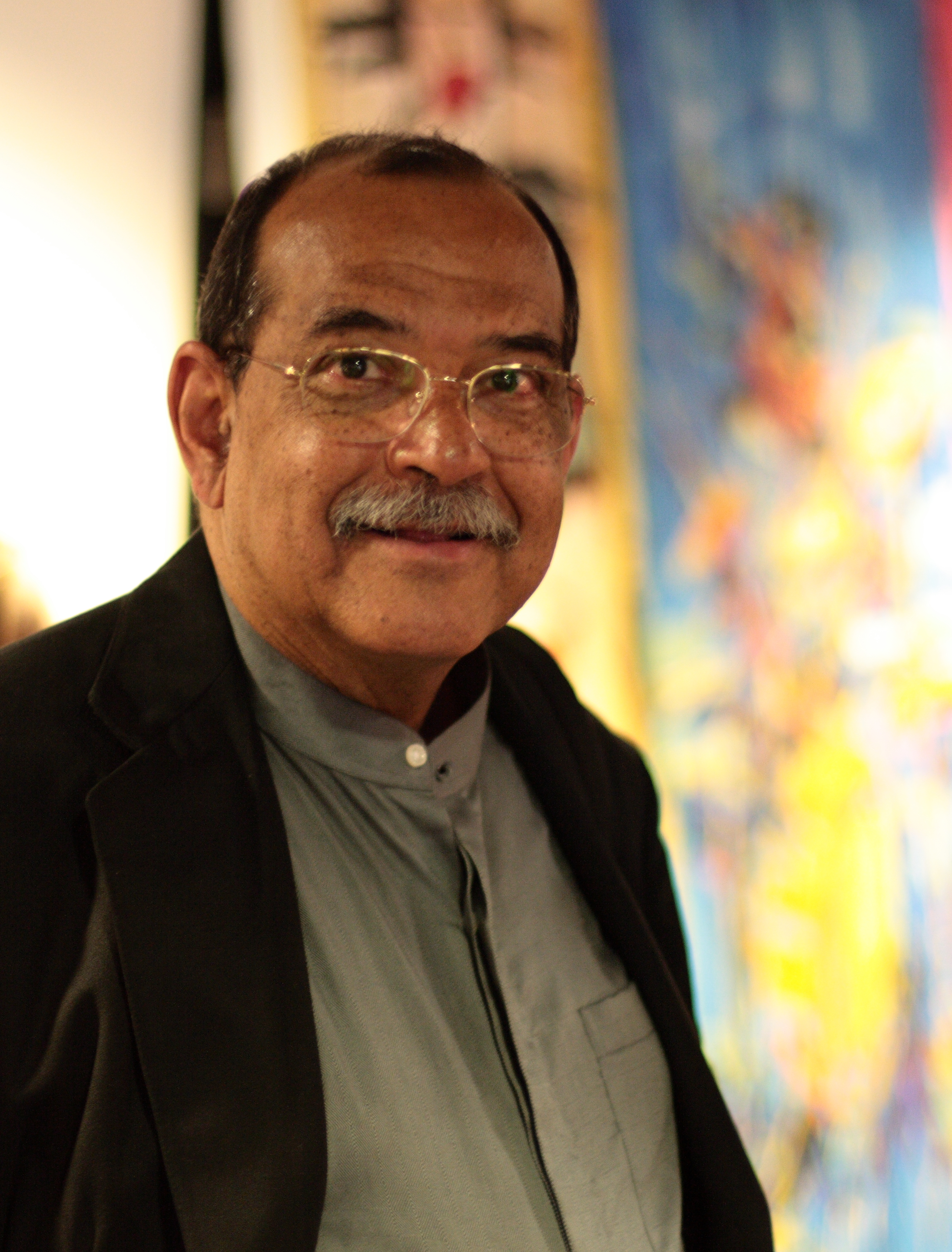
- Watts in 2008

Background information
- Born: Ernest James Watts; October 23, 1945 (age 80); Norfolk, Virginia, U.S.
- Genres: Jazz; R&B
- Occupation: Musician
- Instruments: Saxophone; clarinet; flute
- Years active: 1960s–present
- Labels: Motown; Tamla; Atlantic; Warner Bros.; A&M; CBS; Qwest
- Formerly of: Buddy Rich band; The Tonight Show Band; Charlie Haden Quartet West
- Website: erniewatts.com

Ernest James Watts (born October 23, 1945) is an American jazz and R&B saxophonist who plays soprano, alto, and tenor saxophones. He has worked with Charlie Haden's band Quartet West and toured with the Rolling Stones. On Frank Zappa's album The Grand Wazoo, he played the "Mystery Horn", a straight-necked C melody saxophone. Watts also played the saxophone riff on "The One You Love" from Glenn Frey's album No Fun Aloud.

== Biography ==
Watts was born in Norfolk, Virginia, and began playing saxophone at age 13. After a brief period at West Chester University, he attended the Berklee College of Music on a DownBeat magazine scholarship. He toured with Buddy Rich in the late 1960s, occupying one of the alto saxophone chairs, and visited Africa on a U.S. State Department tour with Oliver Nelson's group.

Watts played alto saxophone with The Tonight Show Band under Doc Severinsen for 20 years and was a member of Barry White's Love Unlimited Orchestra. He was a featured soloist on many of Marvin Gaye's Motown albums during the 1970s, as well as on many other pop and R&B sessions during his 25 years as a studio musician in Los Angeles. He has won two Grammy Awards as an instrumentalist. In 1978, Watts provided the saxophone solo for Andrew Gold's hit single Never Let Her Slip Away.

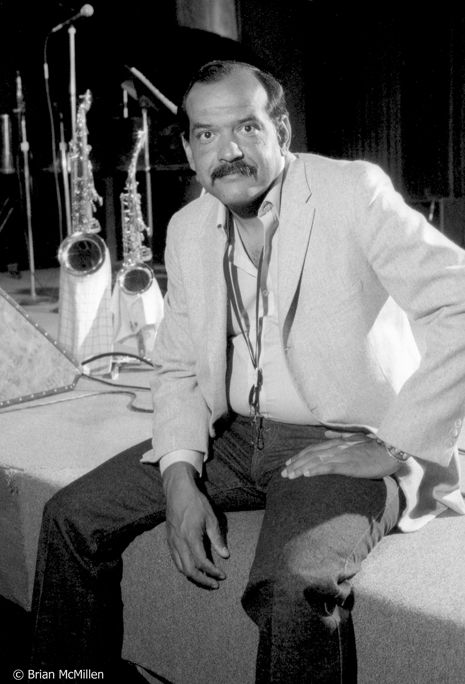
Watts with With Charlie Haden's Quartet West, Great American Music Hall, 1987

Watts was added to the lineup of backing musicians on the fifth show of the Rolling Stones American Tour 1981 and was with them through the end of the tour. Throughout the tour, Watts's influence on the Stones' live performance grew significantly, with the Stones jamming longer and longer over tracks such as "Just My Imagination", "Beast of Burden" and "Waiting on a Friend". Watts can be heard soloing on two tracks on Still Life, the live album recorded during the tour.

In the mid-1980s, Watts decided to rededicate himself to jazz. He recorded and toured with German guitarist and composer Torsten de Winkel, drummer Steve Smith, and keyboardist Tom Coster. He was invited to join Charlie Haden's Quartet West; the two met backstage one night after Haden heard Watts play "Nightbird" by Michel Colombier.

Watts also played on soundtracks for the movies Grease and The Color Purple and on the theme song for the TV show Night Court. In 1982, his version of "Chariots of Fire" was featured in the Season 4 episode of WKRP in Cincinnati ("The Creation of Venus"). He was featured on one of Windows XP's sample tracks, "Highway Blues" by New Stories.

In 1986, Watts visited South America with the Pat Metheny Special Quartet, alongside Charlie Haden and Paul Wertico, playing at Shams in Buenos Aires, Argentina.

In 2008, his album Analog Man won the Independent Music Award for Best Jazz Album. He played on Kurt Elling's album Dedicated to You: Kurt Elling Sings the Music of Coltrane and Hartman, which won the Grammy Award for Best Jazz Vocal Album in 2011.

== Discography ==
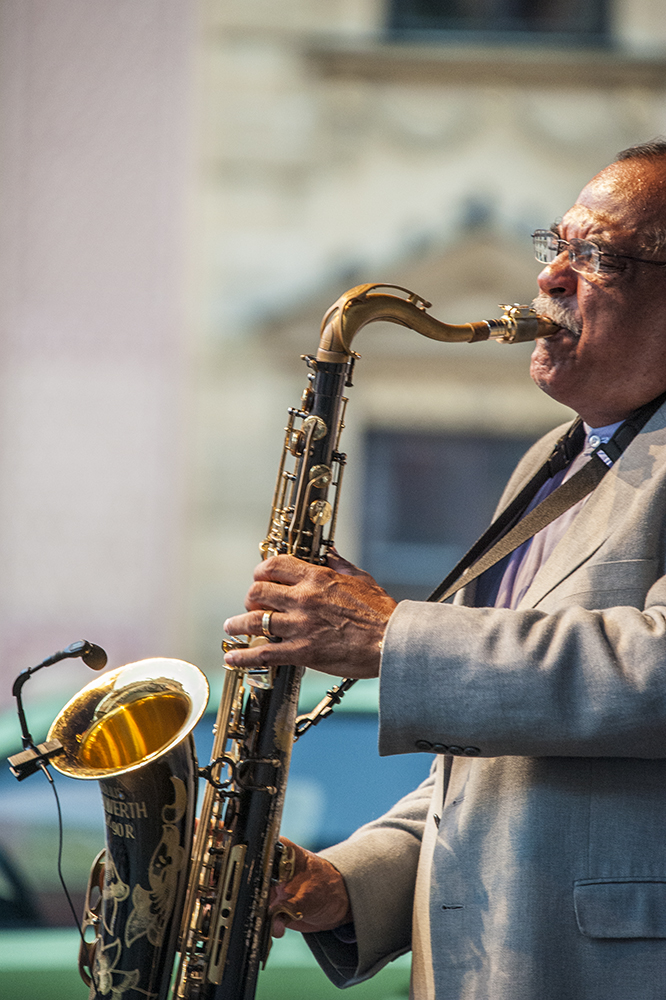
Watts at the Old Town Market Square in Warsaw, Poland, August 2012

=== As leader ===
- Planet Love (Pacific Jazz, 1969)
- The Wonder Bag (Vault, 1972)
- Look in Your Heart (Elektra, 1980)
- Chariots of Fire (Qwest, 1982)
- Musician (Qwest, 1985)
- Sanctuary (Qwest, 1986)
- The Ernie Watts Quartet (JVC, 1987 [1991])
- Afoxe with Gilberto Gil (CTI, 1991)
- Reaching Up (JVC, 1994)
- Unity (JVC, 1995)
- Long Road Home (JVC, 1996)
- Classic Moods (JVC, 1998)
- Reflections with Ron Feuer (Flying Dolphin, 2000)
- Alive (Flying Dolphin, 2004)
- Spirit Song (Flying Dolphin, 2005)
- Analog Man (Flying Dolphin, 2006)
- To The Point (Flying Dolphin, 2007)
- Four Plus Four (Flying Dolphin, 2009)
- Oasis (Flying Dolphin, 2011)
- A Simple Truth (Flying Dolphin, 2014)
- Wheel of Time (Flying Dolphin, 2016)
- Home Light (Flying Dolphin, 2018)

With Karma

- Celebration (Horizon/A&M, 1976)
- For Everybody (Horizon/A&M, 1977)

=== As a member ===
Friendship
(With Abraham Laboriel, Alex Acuña, Don Grusin, Lee Ritenour and Steve Forman)

- Friendship (Elektra, 1979)

The GRP All-Star Big Band

- GRP All-Star Big Band (GRP, 1992)
- Dave Grusin Presents the GRP All-Star Big Band Live!, (GRP, 1993)
- All Blues, (GRP, 1995)

The Super Black Blues Band
(With T-Bone Walker, Otis Spann and Joe Turner)

- Super Black Blues (BluesTime, 1969)

Sergio Mendes
Also, he played saxophone in album Confetti (1983) during track 5.

=== As sideman ===
With Billy Alessi and Bobby Alessi

- Words and Music (A&M, 1979)
- Long Time Friends (Qwest, 1982)

With Paul Anka

- The Music Man (United Artists, 1977)
- Walk a Fine Line (CBS, 1983)

With Patti Austin

- Patti Austin (Qwest, 1984)
- The Real Me (Qwest, 1988)
- Love Is Gonna Getcha (GRP, 1990)

With Donald Byrd

- Caricatures (Blue Note, 1976)
- Donald Byrd and 125th Street, N.Y.C. (Elektra, 1979)

With Christopher Cross

- Another Page (Warner Bros., 1983)
- Arthur's Theme (Best That You Can Do) (Arthur - The Album. Warner Bros., 1981)

With Marvin Gaye

- Let's Get It On (Tamla, 1973)
- I Want You (Tamla, 1976)

With Charlie Haden

- Quartet West (Verve, 1987)
- The Private Collection (Naim, 2000) – rec. 1987–88
- In Angel City (Verve, 1988)
- The Montreal Tapes: Liberation Music Orchestra (Verve, 1999) – rec. 1989
- Haunted Heart (Verve, 1992)
- Always Say Goodbye (Verve, 1994)
- Now Is the Hour (Verve, 1996)
- The Art of the Song (Verve, 1999)
- Sophisticated Ladies (EmArcy, 2010)

With Gene Harris

- Alley Cats (Concord, 1999)

With Bobby Hutcherson

- Head On (Blue Note, 1971)
- Linger Lane (Blue Note, 1975)
- Montara (Blue Note, 1975)

With Quincy Jones

- Roots (A&M, 1977)
- The Dude (A&M, 1981)

With Carole King

- Music (Ode, 1971)
- Rhymes & Reasons (Ode, 1972)
- Fantasy (Ode, 1973)
- Wrap Around Joy (Ode, 1974)
- Simple Things (Capitol, 1977)
- Welcome Home (Capitol, 1978)

With Teena Marie

- Wild and Peaceful (Gordy, 1979)
- Roobery (Epic, 1983)
- Starchild (Epic, 1984)

With Lee Ritenour

- Captain Fingers 1977
- Stolen Moments (GRP, 1989)
- Festival (Lee Ritenour album) 1988

With Boz Scaggs

- Slow Dancer (Columbia, 1974)
- Down Two Then Left (Columbia, 1977)

With Lalo Schifrin

- Gypsies (Tabu, 1978)
- No One Home (Tabu, 1979)

With Frankie Valli

- Valli (Private Stock, 1976)
- Frankie Valli... Is the Word (Warner Bros., 1978)

With Deniece Williams

- This Is Niecy (Columbia, 1976)
- I'm So Proud (Columbia, 1983)

With Gerald Wilson

- Eternal Equinox (Pacific Jazz, 1969)
- Lomelin (Discovery, 1981)
- Jessica (Trend, 1982)
- Calafia (Trend, 1985)

With Bill Withers

- Making Music (Columbia, 1975)
- Watching You, Watching Me (Columbia, 1985)

With Betty Wright

- Betty Wright (Epic, 1981)
- Wright Back At You (Epic, 1983)

With others

- Gene Ammons, Free Again (Prestige, 1971)
- David Axelrod, Earth Rot (Capitol, 1970)
- Willie Bobo, Tomorrow Is Here (1977)
- Brass Fever, Time Is Running Out (Impulse!, 1976)
- Peabo Bryson and Natalie Cole, We're the Best of Friends (Capitol, 1979)
- Kenny Burrell, Both Feet on the Ground (Fantasy, 1973)
- Cher, Take Me Home (Casablanca, 1979)
- Paul Clark, Aim for the Heart (Seed Records, 1980)
- Stanley Clarke, Time Exposure (CBS, 1984)
- Joe Cocker, Have a Little Faith (550 Music, 1994)
- Natalie Cole, Don't Look Back (Capitol, 1980)
- Himiko Kikuchi, ‘’Don’t Be Stupid’’ (Teichiku Records Co., Ltd., 1980)
- Randy Crawford, Secret Combination (Warner Bros., 1981)
- Dion DiMucci, Streetheart (Warner Bros., 1976)
- Kurt Elling, Dedicated to You: Kurt Elling Sings the Music of Coltrane and Hartman (Concord, 2009)
- Aretha Franklin, You (Atlantic, 1975)
- Michael Franks, Burchfield Nines (Warner Bros., 1978)
- Glenn Frey, No Fun Aloud (Asylum, 1982)
- Gamalon, Project: Activation Earth (Amherst,1989)
- Gloria Gaynor, Stories (Polydor, 1980)
- Dizzy Gillespie, Free Ride (Pablo, 1977)
- Benny Golson, Killer Joe (Columbia, 1977)
- Jennifer Holliday, Get Close to My Love (Geffen, 1987)
- Milt Jackson, Memphis Jackson (Impulse!, 1969)
- J. J. Johnson, Concepts in Blue (Pablo Today, 1981)
- Rickie Lee Jones, Rickie Lee Jones (Warner Bros., 1979)
- Charles Kynard, Charles Kynard (Mainstream, 1971)
- Cheryl Lynn, Cheryl Lynn (Columbia, 1978)
- Eric Martin, Eric Martin (Capitol, 1985)
- John Mayall, Moving On (Polydor, 1973)
- Paul McCartney, Pipes of Peace (Parlophone, 1983)
- Carmen McRae, Can't Hide Love (Blue Note, 1976)
- Jim Messina, One More Mile (Warner Bros., 1983)
- Blue Mitchell, Vital Blue (Mainstream, 1971)
- Maria Muldaur, Southern Winds (Warner Bros., 1978)
- Rob Mullins, Tokyo Nights (Nova, 1990)
- Aaron Neville, The Grand Tour (A&M, 1993)
- New Stories, Speakin' Out (Origin, 1999)
- Randy Newman, Trouble in Paradise (Reprise, 1983)
- Jeffrey Osborne, Jeffrey Osborne (A&M, 1982)
- Jean-Luc Ponty, King Kong: Jean-Luc Ponty Plays the Music of Frank Zappa (World Pacific/Liberty,1970)
- Bonnie Raitt, Takin' My Time (Warner Bros., 1973)
- Willis Alan Ramsey, Willis Alan Ramsey (Shelter, 1972)
- Helen Reddy, Reddy (Capitol, 1979)
- Rolling Stones, Still Life (Rolling Stones, 1982)
- Rufus and Chaka Khan, Stompin' at the Savoy – Live (Warner Bros., 1983)
- Moacir Santos, Carnival of the Spirits (Blue Note, 1975)
- Bob Seger, Like a Rock (Capitol, 1986)
- Bud Shank, Windmills of Your Mind (Pacific Jazz, 1969)
- Steely Dan, Countdown to Ecstasy (ABC, 1973)
- Barbra Streisand, Songbird (Columbia, 1978)
- Donna Summer, Donna Summer (Geffen, 1982)
- England Dan & John Ford Coley, Dr. Heckle and Mr. Jive (Big Tree, 1979)
- Gábor Szabó, Faces (Mercury, 1977)
- Mariya Takeuchi, Variety (Moon, 1984)
- James Taylor, In the Pocket (Rhino, 1976)
- Gino Vannelli, Brother to Brother (A&M, 1978)
- Sarah Vaughan, Brazilian Romance (CBS, 1987)
- Dionne Warwick, Love at First Sight (Warner Bros., 1977)
- Torsten de Winkel and Hellmut Hattler, Mastertouch (EMI, 1985)
