= Roxy Theatre (West Hollywood, California) =

Nightclub

- The Roxy
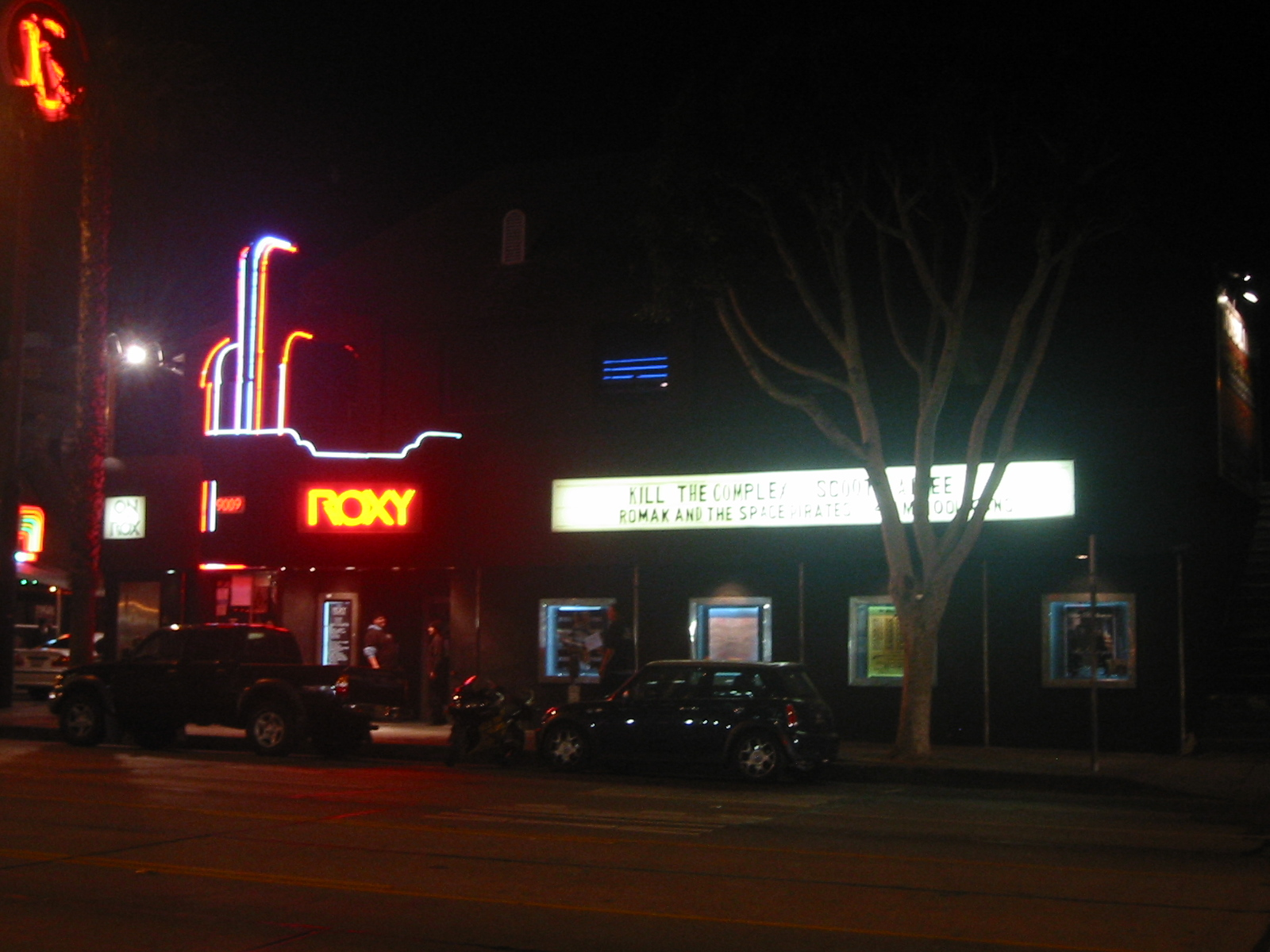
- The Roxy Theatre on the Sunset Strip
- Interactive map of Roxy Theatre
- Address: 9009 W Sunset Blvd
- Location: West Hollywood, California 90069
- Coordinates: 34.090765°N 118.388029°W
- Owner: Lou Adler and Nic Adler
- Capacity: 500
- Type: Nightclub
- Event: Rock

Construction
- Opened: September 20, 1973

Website
- theroxy.com

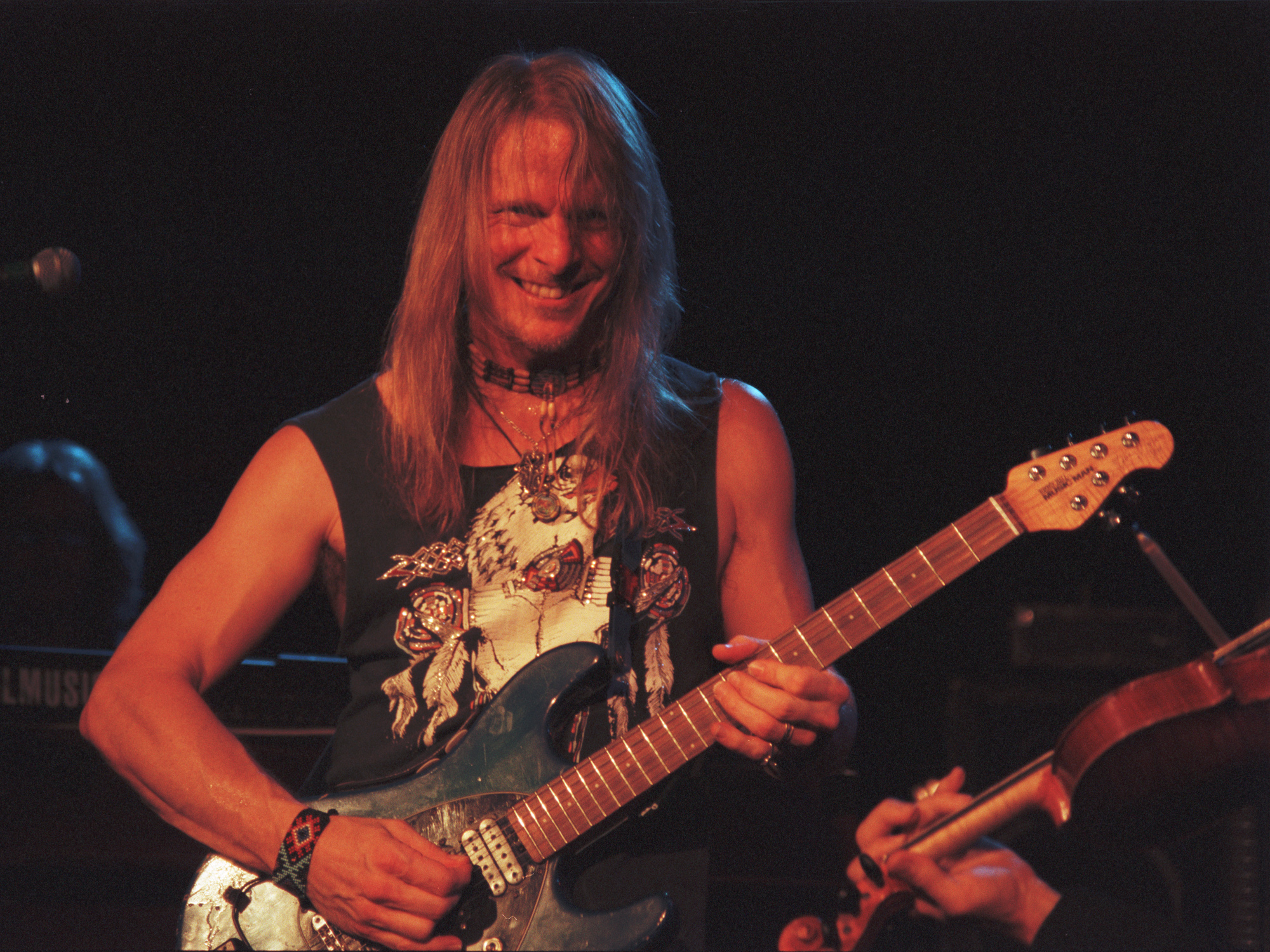
Steve Morse live with the Dixie Dregs at the Roxy, August 1999

The Roxy Theatre (often just the Roxy) is a nightclub on the Sunset Strip in West Hollywood, California, owned by Lou Adler and his son, Nic.

== History ==
Prior to 1969, the Roxy Theatre was the Largo, an upscale burlesque club.

The Roxy was opened on September 20, 1973, by Elmer Valentine and Lou Adler, along with original partners David Geffen, Elliot Roberts and Peter Asher. (Adler was also responsible for bringing the stage play The Rocky Horror Show to the United States, and it opened its first American run at The Roxy Theatre in 1974, before it was made into the movie The Rocky Horror Picture Show the next year.)

Neil Young and the Santa Monica Flyers (billed as Crazy Horse, a related ensemble) played the Roxy for the first three days it was open. Only three months later, the Genesis lineup with Peter Gabriel played several consecutive days at the Roxy, a run that some band members and many fans consider to be amongst their finest performances (due in part, to the intimate atmosphere and good acoustics of the venue).

Paul Reubens, then a struggling comedian, introduced his Pee-wee Herman character in a revue here in 1981 that included such aspiring comics as Phil Hartman and Elayne Boosler.

Tom Eyen's hit comedy Women Behind Bars enjoyed a long extended run with such stars as Lu Leonard, Adrienne Barbeau, Sally Kellerman, and Linda Blair, and was the site of the first AIDS benefit held in Los Angeles on July 27, 1983.

In January 2014, Goldenvoice became the exclusive promoter for The Roxy and ushered in a new era by bringing in big-name acts such as U2 and Foo Fighters.

== Recordings and notable performances ==
Flyer for the Gorilla Biscuits, Excel, Ignite and Cosmic Joke concert from May 2026 (shown below), photo taken nearby the Westchester/Veterans station in Inglewood

- Neil Young recorded the live album Roxy: Tonight's The Night Live on September 20–22, 1973. The album was released in April 2018.
- Nine songs from Bruce Springsteen & the E Street Band's Live/1975-85 album were recorded at the Roxy from shows on October 18-19, 1975 and July 7, 1978. The 1978 show was also broadcast on local radio station KMET and released as a live album in July 2018. One of the nights done in 1975 was released in December 2018.
- Frank Zappa & The Mothers of Invention recorded most of their Roxy and Elsewhere (1974) album during December 1973. Since 1974, various albums have included material from those shows. In 2015, a live concert video was released showing those performances. The entire series of performances (all four public shows from December 9–10, 1973) was released as a 7-CD box set in February 2018.
- Richard Pryor recorded Bicentennial Nigger in July 1976.
- Bob Marley & The Wailers recorded Live at the Roxy (released in 2008) on May 26, 1976.
- Bob Marley & The Wailers played here on November 27, 1979 as part of their Survival Tour.
- The Roxy is featured prominently in Cheech & Chong's 1978 film Up in Smoke where they perform their song "Earache My Eye" at the Rock Fight of the Century, a battle of the bands.
- Van Morrison recorded a radio show in November 1978 that was released as a promo LP Live at the Roxy.
- Warren Zevon's live album, Stand in the Fire, was recorded during five shows he played at The Roxy in April 1980. He also recorded another album, Live at The Roxy, in April 1978, and this was released in 2020.
- The Tragically Hip recorded Live at the Roxy in 1991.
- Jazz group The Crusaders recorded the live album Scratch at the Roxy in 1974.
- The Ramones played their first California concert at the Roxy on August 11, 1976. The concert scenes for their 1979 movie Rock 'n' Roll High School were filmed at the Roxy in December 1978.
- George Benson's Platinum live album Weekend in L.A. (1978) was culled from a three-night engagement at The Roxy from September 30 – October 2, 1977.
- John Mayall's November 24, 1976 concert at the Roxy was released in 1977 as "Lots of People".
- The live album Welcome to the Club by the Ian Hunter Band, featuring Mick Ronson, was recorded at the Roxy during seven shows over a week in November 1979 and released the following year.
- English prog rock band Gentle Giant played their last gig here on June 16, 1980. The soundboard recording was later released as the live album The Last Steps.
- English prog rock band Genesis played six shows in three days on December 17-19, 1973 as part of their Selling England by the Pound tour. They also played here on May 25, 1980 as part of their Duke tour.
- Musician Stevie Wonder played a concert at the Roxy featuring the first ever live performances of his hits "Lately" and "Master Blaster (Jammin')".
- Tom Browne presents his album Love Approach with the hit "Funkin' for Jamaica" feat. Toni Smith, in August 1980.
- The Crusaders present their new LP with "Street Life" feat. Randy Crawford, in August 1980.
- Chaka Khan presents "What cha gonna do for me" with Steve Ferrone and Brecker Bros. on June 7, 1981
- Billy & The Beaters' 1981 debut album (including singles "I Can Take Care of Myself" and "At This Moment") was recorded live at the Roxy January 15–17, 1981.
- In 1984, Ratt recorded the video for their hit single "Back for More" from the album Out of the Cellar at The Roxy.
- Guns N' Roses recorded Live at the Roxy in 1986. Razor Fury had a show in 1987.
- Jane's Addiction recorded the basic tracks for their 1987 self-titled debut album, at The Roxy in January, 1987. While the album was finished in studio, the band hoped tracking the basics live would better help capture the energy and essence of the band.
- Japanese rock band Show-Ya recorded a live video clip for their song "We'll Still Be Hangin' On" at the Roxy. The concert took place on April 27 1988. As a side note, members of the band Vixen can be seen in the video watching them play.
- The Too Hot For Snakes album by Carla Olson and Mick Taylor was recorded on March 4, 1990.
- Agent Orange's live album Real Live Sound was recorded here on July 21, 1990.
- System of a Down made their first performance here on May 28, 1995, due to their manager and bassist Shavo Odadjian persisting.
- NOFX's live album I Heard They Suck Live!! was recorded at the Roxy on January 8–9, 1995.
- Michel Polnareff's live album Live at the Roxy was recorded in 1995 and released in 1996.
- Social Distortion released a live album, entitled Live at the Roxy on June 30, 1998, that was recorded on April 7–9, 1998.
- Gustavo Cerati as part of the album presentation tour: Bocanada in December 2000.
- The CD/DVD album Collision Course by Linkin Park and Jay-Z, comes with a DVD that contains behind the scene footage and the second take of all the Collision Course's songs at the Roxy Theatre on July 18, 2004.
- Adele performed at the theatre during her debut concert tour called "An Evening with Adele" on 21 May 2008.
- Sum 41 shot the video for their song "Screaming Bloody Murder" at the Roxy on April 3, 2011.
- Fuse TV taped the live performance of Red Hot Chili Peppers for Fuse Presents: Red Hot Chili Peppers Live from the Roxy on August 22, 2011.
- Korn shot the performance part of the video for their song "Narcissistic Cannibal" at the Roxy on September 27, 2011.
- Escape the Fate released a DVD, Escape the Fate: Live from the Roxy from their free show there on January 6, 2013. It was included in their Deluxe version of the album Ungrateful.
- 7horse held their record release party for their latest album “The Last Resort” on November 4, 2022. Guests included Nick Maybury and Cherie Currie, as well as burlesque dancers, magician and other assorted characters.
- Al Stewart recorded the live section of his album Live/Indian Summer from 28-30 April 1981 and released in October 1981.
- Trevor Rabin recorded his live album, Live in LA at the Roxy in 1989, later released in 2003
- Justin Bieber performed here on March 26, 2026.
- Gorilla Biscuits, Excel, Ignite and Cosmic Joke performed here on May 25, 2026.

== See also ==
- Rainbow Bar and Grill
- Whisky a Go Go
- Sunset Strip
- Troubadour
- The Viper Room
