= Thighs High (Grip Your Hips and Move) =

Single by Tom Browne

from the album Magic
- B-side: "Dreams of Lovin' You" (7"); "Funkin' for Jamaica (N.Y.)" (12")
- Released: 1980
- Recorded: 1980
- Genre: Funk, Boogie
- Length: 4:34
- Label: Arista
- Songwriter(s): Tom Browne, Toni Smith
- Producer(s): Dave Grusin; Larry Rosen

"Thighs High (Grip Your Hips and Move)" is a 1980 single by jazz trumpeter, Tom Browne. The single is from his third solo album, Magic. The vocals for the single were provided by Toni Smith, who also helped compose the song. The song hit #4 on Billboard's Hot Soul Singles chart. On the US dance chart, "Thighs High" peaked at #25.

In 1995, French pianist Alex Bugnon covered the song from his album "Tales from the Bright Side."

The song was sampled by rapper Coolio on his 1995 song "1, 2, 3, 4 (Sumpin' New)".

In 1981 the British group the Evasions released a hit song titled "Wikka Wrap". Though the song is a parody of UK broadcaster Alan Whicker, it samples "Thighs High", along with "Funkin' for Jamaica (N.Y.)" (also by Browne).
