= Two Worlds =

Two Worlds may refer to:

== Film and television ==
- Two Worlds (1922 film), a German silent film directed by Richard Löwenbein
- Two Worlds (1930 British film), a film directed by E.A. Dupont
- Two Worlds (1930 German film), a German-language version of the British film, also directed by Dupont
- Two Worlds (1940 film), a German film directed by Gustaf Gründgens
- Two Worlds (2007 film), a French film directed by Daniel Cohen
- Two Worlds (2019 film), a Burmese family drama film
- Two Worlds (TV series), a Thai TV series
- "Two Worlds" (Tenkai Knights), the pilot episode of the anime series Tenkai Knights

== Music ==
- Two Worlds (ATB album), 2000
- Two Worlds (Lee Ritenour and Dave Grusin album), 2000
- Two Worlds, an album by the Aschere Project featuring Dave Davies, 2010
- Two Worlds, an album by Tigers Jaw, 2010
- "Two Worlds" (song), by Phil Collins, 2000
- "Two Worlds", a song by Disturbed from Ten Thousand Fists, 2005

== Other media ==
- Two Worlds (video game), a 2007 role-playing video game
  - Two Worlds II, a 2010 sequel
- Two Worlds (drama), an 1882 play in verse by Apollon Maykov
- Two Worlds (radio serial), a 1952 Australian radio drama by Vance Palmer

== See also ==
- Dui Prithibi (disambiguation)
