= Collection (Dave Grusin album) =

Compilation album by Dave Grusin
- Released: 1989
- Recorded: 1976–1989
- Studio: Various
- Genre: Jazz
- Length: 57:59
- Label: GRP
- Producer: Dave Grusin, Larry Rosen

Dave Grusin chronology
Sticks and Stones (1988)	Collection (1989)	The Fabulous Baker Boys (1989)

Collection is an album by American pianist Dave Grusin released in 1989, recorded for the GRP label. Collection is a retrospective of Grusin's work from 1976–1989 . The album reached No. 3 on Billboard's Contemporary Jazz chart.

== Track listing ==
All tracks composed by Dave Grusin; except where indicated

1. "She Could Be Mine" (Don Grusin) – 5:15
2. "Thankful 'n' Thoughtful" (Sylvester Stewart) – 4:10
3. "River Song" (Dave Grusin, Don Grusin) – 5:10
4. "Playera" (Enrique Granados, Carlos Molina) – 8:44
5. "An Actor's Life" from the movie Tootsie – 5:07
6. "St. Elsewhere" theme from the TV show St. Elsewhere – 4:13
7. "Serengeti Walk" (Dave Grusin, Harvey Mason, Louis Johnson) – 6:16
8. "Early A.M. Attitude" – 4:58
9. "Bossa Baroque" – 4:17
10. "Lupita" – 1:08
11. "On Golden Pond" main theme from the movie On Golden Pond – 3:35
12. "Mountain Dance" – 6:14

== Personnel ==
- Dave Grusin – Fender Rhodes electric piano, piano, synthesizers, percussion, conductor
- Don Grusin – synthesizers
- David Sanborn – saxophone
- Grover Washington, Jr. – saxophone on "Playera"
- Ernie Watts – saxophone on "An Actor's Life"
- Lee Ritenour – guitar
- Eric Gale – guitar on "Serengeti Walk"
- Carlos Ruiz – guitar
- Marcus Miller – bass
- Abraham Laboriel – bass
- Jimmy Johnson – bass on "Early A.M. Attitude"
- Steve Gadd – drums
- Harvey Mason – drums
- Rubens Bassini – percussion
- Paulinho Da Costa – percussion on "Early A.M. Attitude"
- Carlos Vega – drums on "Early A.M. Attitude"

== Charts ==
Chart (1989)	Peak position
US Billboard Jazz Albums	3
