= Amparo (album) =

Studio album by Lee Ritenour and Dave Grusin
- Released: May 17, 2008
- Recorded: 2007–2008
- Genre: Jazz, classical, international
- Length: 55:15
- Label: Capitol

Amparo is a classical album by jazz musicians and composers Lee Ritenour and Dave Grusin. Musical guests include Joshua Bell, Chris Botti, Renée Fleming, and James Taylor. This is Ritenour and Grusin's second classical album together, their first one being Two Worlds, which was released in 2000. Both were Grammy nominated, Two Worlds for Best Classical Crossover Album at the 43rd Annual Grammy Awards, and the second track on Amparo, "Danzón de Entiqueta," for Best Instrumental Composition at the 51st Annual Grammy Awards.

== Track listing ==
1. "Tango en Parque Central" (Grusin) - 4:39
2. "Danzón de Entiqueta" (Grusin) - 4:51
3. "Joropo Peligroso" (Grusin) - 6:19
4. "Pavane", for orchestra & chorus ad lib in F sharp minor Op. 50 (Gabriel Fauré) - 5:51
5. "My Bonny Boy" (Ralph Vaughan Williams) - 5:04
6. "Since First I Saw Your Face", song for 4 voices & instruments (Thomas Ford) - 3:33
7. "Olha Maria" (Antônio Carlos Jobim) - 4:37
8. "Ma Mère L'Oye" (Mother Goose Suite) (Maurice Ravel) - 4:50
9. "Échos", for guitar and piano (Ritenour) - 5:56
10. "Adagio", for violin, strings & organ in G minor, T Mi 26 (Remo Giazotto) - 5:37
11. "Duetto: Scherzano sul tuo volto" (George Frederick Handel) - 3:58
