= Now Playing =

Now Playing may refer to:

- Now Playing (Dave Grusin album), released in 2004
- Now Playing (Juris album), released in 2010
- Now Playing (magazine), a short-lived entertainment magazine
