= The Fabulous Baker Boys (disambiguation) =

The Fabulous Baker Boys may refer to:

== Film ==
- The Fabulous Baker Boys, a 1989 American romantic musical comedy-drama film

== Television ==
- "The Fabulous Baker Boy", episode 18 of the seventh season of Will & Grace

== Music ==
- The Fabulous Baker Boys (Motion Picture Soundtrack), the film's soundtrack
- The Fabulous Baker Boys, a UK garage duo known for the 1997 UK chart hit single "Oh Boy"
- "The Fabulous Baker Boy", a song by Eraserheads from the 1996 album Fruitcake
