= The Gershwin Connection =

Studio album by Dave Grusin
- Released: 1991
- Recorded: 1991
- Studio: Ocean Way Recording and Sunset Sound (Hollywood, California); Starlight Studio (Malibu, California); Mad Hatter Studios (Los Angeles, California); Clinton Recording Studios (New York City, New York)
- Genre: Jazz
- Length: 64:56
- Label: GRP
- Producer: Dave Grusin; Larry Rosen

Dave Grusin chronology
The Bonfire of the Vanities (soundtrack) (1991)	The Gershwin Connection (1991)	The Firm (soundtrack) (1993)

The Gershwin Connection is an album by American pianist Dave Grusin released in 1991, recorded for the GRP label. The album reached #1 on Billboard's jazz chart. The medley Bess, You Is My Woman Now/I Loves You Porgy received the 1992 Grammy Award for Best Arrangement of an Instrumental.

== Reception ==
The Gershwin Connection received extremely positive reviews. Scott Yanow at All Music called the album "a very tasteful and respectful set -- a classy package". Leonard Feather in the Los Angeles Times gave it a four-star review and praised this "delightfully modest, jazz-oriented set, with Grusin's piano at its most graceful and tasteful".

== Track listing ==
1. "That Certain Feeling" - 1:12
2. "Soon" - 4:03
3. "Fascinating Rhythm" - 5:01
4. "Prelude II" - 5:39
5. "How Long Has This Been Going On?" - 5:13
6. "There's a Boat Dat's Leavin' Soon for New York" - 5:40
7. "My Man's Gone Now" - 6:52
8. "Maybe" - 3:51
9. "Our Love is Here to Stay" - 3:14
10. "'S Wonderful" - 3:47
11. "I've Got Plenty O' Nuthin'" - 6:06
12. "Nice Work if You Can Get It" - 3:30
13. Medley: "Bess, You Is My Woman Now/I Loves You Porgy" - 5:48

== Personnel ==
- George Gershwin – player piano (1)
- Dave Grusin – acoustic piano (2, 3, 5, 7, 9, 10, 12, 13) keyboards (4, 6, 8, 11), arrangements and conductor
- Chick Corea – acoustic piano (10)
- Don Grusin – clavinet (11)
- Lee Ritenour – acoustic guitar (9), guitars (11)
- John Pattitucci – bass (2–9, 11), fretless bass solo (4)
- Dave Weckl – drums (2, 3, 5, 7–9)
- Sonny Emory – drums (4, 6, 11)
- Gary Burton – vibraphones (3, 8)
- Eddie Daniels – clarinet (2, 4)
- Eric Marienthal – soprano saxophone (6), alto saxophone (7)
- Sal Marquez – trumpet (7, 9)
- David Nadien – string concertmaster (13)
- Ettore Stratta – string conductor (13)

=== Production ===
- Larry Rosen – executive producer
- Dave Grusin – executive producer, producer
- Bernie Kirsch – recording (2, 3, 5, 7–10)
- Geoff Gillette – recording (4, 6, 11)
- Ed Rak – guitar recording (9, 11), recording (12, 13)
- Don Murray – string recording (13), mixing
- Mark Guilbeault – recording assistant (2, 3, 5, 7–9)
- Eric Rudd – recording assistant (2, 3, 5, 7–9)
- Mike Kloster – recording assistant (4, 6, 11), mix assistant
- Robert Read – recording assistant (10)
- Troy Halderson – recording assistant (12, 13)
- Robert Vosgien – digital editing at CMS Digital (Pasadena, California)
- Wally Traugott – mastering at Capitol Studios (Hollywood, California)
- Joseph Doughney and Michael Landy – post-production at The Review Room (New York City, New York)
- Michelle Lewis – production coordinator
- Michael Pollard – production coordination assistant
- Andy Baltimore – creative director
- David Gibb – graphic design
- Scott Johnson – graphic design
- Sonny Mediana – graphic design
- Andy Ruggirello – graphic design
- Dan Serrano – graphic design
- Michael Going – front cover photography
- Carol Weinberg – back cover photography
- Frank Driggs and the Gershwin Estate – black and white photography

== Charts ==
Chart (1991)	Peak position
Billboard Jazz Albums	1
