= Magic (Tom Browne album) =

Studio album by Tom Browne
- Released: 1981
- Recorded: 1980–81
- Studio: CBS 30th Street Studio and A & R Recording (New York City, New York)
- Genre: Funk; R&B
- Length: 40:25
- Label: Arista
- Producer: Dave Grusin; Larry Rosen

Tom Browne chronology
Love Approach (1980)	Magic (1981)	Yours Truly (1981)

Professional ratings
Review scores
Source	Rating
Allmusic	link

Magic is a 1981 album by Tom Browne and was released on the Arista Records label. The song, "Thighs High (Grip Your Hips and Move)" features vocals by Toni Smith and peaked at #4 on the R&B charts. Another song, "Let's Dance", peaked at #69 on the R&B charts. "God Bless the Child" is a cover of the song by Billie Holiday.

== Track listing ==
All tracks composed by Tom Browne, except where indicated

1. "Let's Dance" (Sekou Bunch) – 5:24
2. "Magic" (Clifford Branch Jr.) – 4:27
3. "I Know" – 4:48
4. "Midnight Interlude" (Grisha Dimon, Dennis Bell, Claudette Washington) – 5:23
5. "God Bless the Child" (Billie Holiday) – 5:07
6. "Night Wind" (Dave Grusin) – 6:32
7. "Thighs High (Grip Your Hips and Move)" (Browne, Bunch, Grusin, Toni Smith) – 4:40
8. "Making Plans" (Ronny Pace) – 4:04

== Personnel ==
- Tom Browne – trumpet (1–5, 7, 8), horns (1, 3, 8), arrangements (1–3, 7, 8), vocals (3), flugelhorn (6), lead vocals (8)
- Cliff Branch – Rhodes electric piano (1), clavinet (1, 7), backing vocals (1, 7), lead vocals (2), acoustic piano (2), arrangements (2)
- Terry Burrus – acoustic piano (1, 8)
- Dave Grusin – Oberheim OB-X (1–3, 7), clavinet (2, 4), acoustic piano (3, 5, 6, 8), Rhodes electric piano (3, 6, 7), arrangements (3, 5, 6), timpani (8)
- Bernard Wright – Rhodes electric piano (2), acoustic piano (4, 7)
- Dennis Bell – Rhodes electric piano (4), ARP String Ensemble (4), arrangements (4)
- Kevin Cummings – electric guitar (1, 8), backing vocals (1)
- Bobby Broom – electric guitar (2, 7)
- Jeff Mironov – electric guitar (3, 6), acoustic guitar (6)
- Grisha Dimont – electric guitar (4), arrangements (4)
- Sekou Bunch – electric bass (1, 2, 4, 7, 8), backing vocals (1, 7), arrangements (1)
- Marcus Miller – electric bass (3, 6)
- Gregg Barrett – drums (1, 8)
- Buddy Williams – drums (2, 3, 6, 7)
- Howard Grate – drums (4)
- Errol "Crusher" Bennett – percussion (1–4, 6–8)
- Larry Rosen – percussion (6)
- Bob Franceschini – horns (1, 3, 8), tenor saxophone (2)
- James Stowe – horns (1, 3, 8)
- Toni Smith – lead vocals (1, 7), backing vocals (2, 7), vocals (3)
- Pat Windham – lead vocals (4)
- Dorothy Terrell – backing vocals (4)
- Claudette Washington – backing vocals (4)
- Lynette Washington – backing vocals (4)
- Babi Floyd – backing vocals (7)
- Frank Floyd – backing vocals (7)

String section

- David Nadien – concertmaster
- Jonathan Abramowitz, Lamar Alsop, Alfred Brown, Lewis Eley, Max Ellen, Barry Finclair, Regis Iandiorio, Charles Libove, Charles McCracken, Marvin Morgenstern, Jan Mullen, Joseph Rabushka, Matthew Raimondi, Richard Sortomme and Gerald Tarack – string players

Handclaps

- Cliff Branch, Bobby Broom, Tom Browne, Sekou Bunch, Kevin Cummings, Bob Franceschini, Jeanette Mann, Martha Rojas-Browne, Toni Smith, Ann Symonds and Buddy Williams

Vocal group on "Making Plans"

- Cliff Branch, Tom Browne, Sekou Bunch, Kevin Cummings and Toni Smith

== Production ==
- Dave Grusin – producer, mixing, liner notes
- Larry Rosen – producer, recording, mixing, liner notes
- Frank Laico – string recording
- Ollie Cotton – additional recording, recording assistant, mix assistant
- Ted Jensen – mastering at Sterling Sound (New York, NY)
- Peter Lopez – GRP production coordinator
- Donn Davenport – art direction
- Neal Pozner – album design
- John Ford – photography
- Sonia Santos – hair
- Pat Evans – make-up
- Lamarries Moses – stylist
- Jimmy Boyd – management

== Charts ==
Year	Album	Billboard Chart positions			CashBox positions	
Year	Album	US	US R&B	Jazz Albums	US	Jazz Albums
1981	Magic	37	5	2	32	2
