= Mulholland Falls (soundtrack) =

Soundtrack album by Dave Grusin
- Released: May 21, 1996
- Recorded: 1996
- Genre: Jazz
- Label: Edel America
- Producers: Dave Grusin & Larry Rosen

Dave Grusin chronology
The Cure (Motion Picture Soundtrack) (1995)	Mulholland Falls (1996)	Two for the Road (1997)

Mulholland Falls: Original MGM Motion Picture Soundtrack is an album by American pianist Dave Grusin released in 1996 by the Edel America label. This album is the soundtrack to the motion picture Mulholland Falls, directed by Lee Tamahori.

== Track listing ==
All tracks composed by Dave Grusin except where noted

1. "Mulholland Falls" – 4:34
2. "Just a Girl..." – 2:48
3. "Hurting for Allison" – 3:33
4. "Flashback & Revelation" – 3:04
5. "Kate's Theme/The End of Jimmy" – 3:06
6. "Nuclear Madness/Hats in the Desert" – 4:15
7. "Home Movies" – 1:43
8. "It's Over/Flashback" – 3:01
9. "Separation" – 1:33
10. "To the Base/Fallout for Timms" – 3:25
11. "Finale: Hats Off" – 2:56
12. "No Common Ground/End Credits" – 6:50
13. "Harbor Lights" (Wilhelm Grosz, Jimmy Kennedy) – 3:22

== Other music in the film ==
1. "That Certain Party" (Walter Donaldson, Gus Kahn) – Dean Martin
2. "Who Me?" (Frank Foster) – Count Basie
3. "So Tired" – Kay Starr

== Personnel ==
- Dave Grusin - Acoustic Piano, Synthesizer, Conductor
