= The Firm (soundtrack) =

The Firm (Motion Picture Soundtrack)

Soundtrack album by Dave Grusin
- Released: 1993 (original), 2015 (expansion)
- Recorded: Sunset Sound, Los Angeles
- Genre: Jazz
- Length: 49:26 (original), 125:15 (expansion)
- Label: GRP (original); La-La Land (expansion)
- Producer: Dave Grusin, Larry Rosen

Dave Grusin chronology
| The Gershwin Connection (1991) | The Firm (Motion Picture Soundtrack) (1993) | Dave Grusin Presents GRP All-Star Big Band Live! (1993) |

The Firm is an album by American pianist Dave Grusin released in 1993, recorded for the GRP label. This album is a soundtrack to the Motion Picture The Firm directed by Sidney Pollack. It reached No. 131 on Billboard's Contemporary Jazz chart. This soundtrack was a 1993 Academy Award nominee for Best Original Score.

== Track listing ==
All tracks composed by Dave Grusin; except where indicated

1. "The Firm Main Title" - 3:48
2. "Stars on the Water" (Rodney Crowell) performed by Jimmy Buffett- 3:15
3. "Mitch and Abby" - 2:22
4. "M-O-N-E-Y" (Lyle Lovett) - 3:15
5. "Memphis Stomp" - 3:36
6. "Never Mind" (Harlan Howard) performed by Nanci Griffith - 3:42
7. "Ray's Blues" - 4:33
8. "Dance Class" (Dave Samuels) - 5:46
9. "The Plan" - 4:43
10. "Blues:The Death of Love & Trust" - 3:11
11. "Start It Up" (Robben Ford) - 3:43
12. "Mud Island Chase" - 3:53
13. "How Could You Lose Me?" - 3:39

== 2015 release ==
In 2015 La-La Land Records issued a remastered and expanded edition (LLLCD 1328), limited to 3,000 units, featuring the film score on disc one and the 1993 soundtrack album and bonus tracks on disc two. Italicised tracks on disc one are not used in the film, bold tracks contain material not used in the film.

CD 1

1. The Firm – Main Title 3:49
2. Main Title – Parts 2 and 3 4:23
3. Mitch & Abby 2:22
4. First Day on the Job/Lamar Dazed/Memphis Stomp 2:25
5. Dead Lawyers/Mitch Returns Home Late 2:44
6. Mitch Visits Abanks/Secret Files/Mitch Sees Couple Fighting on Beach 2:48
7. Blues: The Death of Love & Trust 3:13
8. Mitch Rents Car to Visit Ray in Jail/Mitch Talks With Ray in Jail 1:40
9. Mitch Leaves Lomax/Mitch Tells Abby of Visit to Ray/Lomax Dies/Newspaper Clipping/Voyles Leaves 2:00
10. Tarrance Threatens Mitch/Mitch Flies Home 1:05
11. Mitch Informs Firm of FBI/Abby Shocked 0:42
12. Mitch Tries to Copy Files – Xerox Alarm/Fried Egg Sandwich 1:34
13. The Photographs/The Cotton Exchange 1:41
14. Confession Blues 3:43
15. Mitch Alone on Beal Street/Switches Briefcases/Nordic Gets Photographed 2:38
16. Mail Fraud Is a Federal Offense/Dog Track/Abby Tells Mitch She's Leaving Him/Nordic Fax 2:20
17. Mitch Gets Into Manager's Office/Abby Phones Tammy 2:22
18. Ray Gets Out of Prison/Fax From Prison/Ray and Elvis on the Run 2:37
19. Avery Passes Out/Copy Secret Files/Abby Taking Files 1:34
20. Mitch Gets Into Avery's Computer 1:41
21. Mitch Bolts/Avery Visits Abby at Schoolyard/Tarrance Gets Phone Call From Mitch 2:55
22. Mud Island – Drone 1:51
23. Ray Gets Into Sea Plane 0:38
24. Mud Island Chase/Stalking/Dead Nordic 5:32
25. Mitch Goes Home/Abby Returns 2:02
26. How Could You Lose Me? – End Title 3:32

CD 2

1. The Firm - Main Title 3:48
2. Stars on the Water - Jimmy Buffett 3:15
3. Mitch and Abby 2:22
4. M-O-N-E-Y - Lyle Lovett 3:15
5. Memphis Stomp 3:36
6. Never Mind - Nanci Griffith 3:42
7. Ray's Blues 4:33
8. Dance Class - Andy Narell 5:46
9. The Plan 4:43
10. Blues:The Death of Love & Trust 3:11
11. Start It Up - Robben Ford 3:43
12. Mud Island Chase 3:53
13. How Could You Lose Me? - End Title 3:39
14. Lamar Dazed (alternate) 1:11
15. The Photographs (alternate) 1:22
16. The Cotton Exchange (alternate) 0:58
17. Abby Tells Mitch She's Leaving Him (alternate) 0:48
18. Mud Island – Drone (alternate) 1:50
19. Mud Island – Drone (second alternate) 1:50
20. Dead Nordic (alternate) 0;44
21. The Photographs – Bees 1:23

== Personnel ==
- Dave Grusin - Acoustic Piano, Synthesizer, Conductor
- Jimmy Buffett - Vocals, Guitar
- Robben Ford - Guitar, Vocals
- Nanci Griffith - Vocals, Guitar
- Lyle Lovett - Vocals, Guitar
- Dave Samuels - Vibraphone

== Charts ==
| Chart (1993) | Peak position |
|---|---|
| Billboard Jazz Albums | 131 |
