= Now Playing (Dave Grusin album) =

Studio album by Dave Grusin
- Released: 2004
- Recorded: February 3–9, 2003
- Studio: Firehouse Recording Studios (Pasadena, California); Sunset Sound (Hollywood, California)
- Genre: Jazz
- Length: 53:57
- Label: GRP
- Producer: Dave Grusin

Dave Grusin chronology
| The Very Best of Dave Grusin (2002) | Now Playing (2004) | Amparo (2008) |

Now Playing is an album by American pianist Dave Grusin released in 2004, recorded for GRP Records. The album features Grusin on solo piano, performing music he composed for various films. This is the only solo piano album Grusin has recorded.

== Track listing ==
All music composed by Dave Grusin

1. "On Golden Pond" (main theme from On Golden Pond) - 3:48
2. "New Hampshire Hornpipe" (from On Golden Pond) - 2:31
3. "The Heart is a Lonely Hunter" (from The Heart is a Lonely Hunter) - 4:45
4. "Lupita" (from The Milagro Beanfield War) - 1:20
5. "Pistolero" (from The Milagro Beanfield War) - 2:01
6. "Milagro" (from The Milagro Beanfield War) - 2:47
7. "Memphis Stomp" (from The Firm) - 3:36
8. "Se Fue" (from Havana) - 3:17
9. "Hurricane Country" (from Havana) - 4:58
10. "It Might Be You" (from Tootsie) - 5:20
11. "Theme from Mulholland Falls" - 4:15
12. "Random Hearts" (from Random Hearts) - 4:08
13. "Heaven Can Wait" (main theme from Heaven Can Wait) - 4:10
14. "Letting Go" (from The Champ) - 3:06
15. "Mud Island Chase" (from The Firm) - 3:55

== Personnel ==
- Dave Grusin – grand piano (Steinway 459)

Production

- Dave Grusin – producer
- Don Murray – recording, mixing, editing
- Ed Wooley – recording assistant, mix assistant, editing assistant
- Robert Vosgien – mastering at Capitol Mastering (Hollywood, California)
- Marsha Black – project coordinator
- John Newcott – release coordinator
- Kelly Pratt – release coordinator
- Hollis King – art direction
- Denise Koleda – design
- Rika Ichiki – design
- Ann Cutting – photography
- Riccardo Vecchio – illustration
