= Dui Prithibi =

Dui Prithibi (transl. Two Worlds) may refer to:

- Dui Prithibi (1980 film), an Indian Bengali-language film featuring Uttam Kumar
- Dui Prithibi (2010 film), an Indian Bengali-language film featuring Jeet
- Dui Prithibi (2015 film), a Bangladeshi film featuring Shakib Khan

== See also ==
- Two Worlds (disambiguation)
