= Two for the Road (Dave Grusin album) =

Studio album by Dave Grusin
- Released: 1997
- Recorded: 1997
- Studio: Avatar Studios and River Studios (New York, NY); Schnee Studios (North Hollywood, CA)
- Genre: Jazz
- Length: 48:11
- Label: GRP
- Producer: Tommy LiPuma

Dave Grusin chronology
Mulholland Falls (1996)	Two for the Road (1997)	Dave Grusin Presents: West Side Story (1997)

Two for the Road is an album by pianist Dave Grusin, of the music of Henry Mancini. It was released in 1997, recorded for GRP Records, and reached No. 1 on Billboard's Jazz chart.

== Track listing ==
- All music composed by Henry Mancini, lyricists indicated
1. "Peter Gunn" - 4:41
2. "Dreamsville" (Jay Livingston, Ray Evans) - 4:38
3. "Mr. Lucky" - 4:23
4. "Moment to Moment" - 4:10
5. "Baby Elephant Walk" - 3:57
6. "Two for the Road" - 5:33
7. "Days of Wine and Roses (Johnny Mercer) - 5:33
8. "Hatari" - 4:56
9. "Whistling in the Dark" - 4:54
10. "Soldier in the Rain (Alan and Marilyn Bergman) - 4:56

== Personnel ==
- Dave Grusin – grand piano, arrangements
- Russell Malone – guitars (1, 2)
- John Pattitucci – bass
- Harvey Mason – drums
- Paulinho da Costa – percussion (3, 8, 9)
- Dan Higgins – saxophones (1, 5)
- Eric Marienthal – saxophones (1, 5)
- Tom Scott – saxophones (1, 5)
- Andy Martin – trombone (1, 5)
- Gary Grant – trumpet (1, 5)
- Jerry Hey – trumpet (1, 5)
- Tollak Ollestad – harmonica (5, 9)
- Diana Krall – vocals (2, 10)

=== Production ===
- Tommy LiPuma – producer
- Al Schmitt – engineer, string recording, horn recording (1, 5)
- Elliot Scheiner – guitar recording (1, 2)
- Lawrence Manchester – assistant engineer
- John Hendrickson – string recording assistant, horn recording assistant (1, 5), assistant engineer (5)
- Tony Gonsalez – guitar recording assistant (1, 2)
- Doug Sax – mastering at The Mastering Lab (Hollywood, California)
- Marsha Black – project coordinator
- Hollis King – art direction
- Robin Lynch – art direction
- JoDee Stringham – design
- Mark Hanauer – photography
- Dave Grusin – liner notes
- Charles Champlin – liner notes

== Charts ==
Chart (1997)	Peak position
Billboard Jazz Albums	1
