= Sticks and Stones (Dave Grusin and Don Grusin album) =

Studio album by Dave Grusin and Don Grusin
- Released: 1988
- Recorded: 1988
- Studio: Starlight Studio, Malibu, California
- Genre: Jazz
- Length: 57:25
- Label: GRP
- Producer: Dave Grusin, Don Grusin

Dave Grusin chronology
Cinemagic (1987)	Sticks and Stones (1988)	Collection (1990)

Professional ratings
Review scores
Source	Rating
AllMusic	4.5/5 stars

Sticks and Stones is an album by American pianist Dave Grusin with his brother Don Grusin. It was released in 1988, recorded for the GRP label. The album reached No. 14 on the Billboard Contemporary Jazz chart.

== Track listing ==
All tracks composed by Dave Grusin; except where indicated

1. "Birds with Long Legs" – 5:03
2. "Pico Pica" (Don Grusin) – 4:57
3. "Sailing at Night" (Don Grusin) – 4:19
4. "River Song" (Dave Grusin, Don Grusin) – 5:10
5. "Sticks and Stones" (Dave Grusin, Don Grusin) – 6:08
6. "Glissade" – 5:18
7. "Good Ol' Boys" (Don Grusin) – 7:28
8. "This Little Pig's Got the Blues" (Don Grusin) – 5:28
9. "Dog Heaven" (Don Grusin) – 4:49
10. "Southern Wind" (Dori Caymmi) – 4:15
11. "North-Tribal Step Dance" – 4:50

== Personnel ==
- Dave Grusin and Don Grusin – all instruments
  - Yamaha DXIIFD, DX7, TX816, TX7, and RX5 Drum Machine
  - Roland D-550, MKS20, and Super Jupiter
  - Sequential Circuits Prophet V.S. and Studio 440 Drum Machine
  - Steinway and Yamaha pianos
  - Atari 1040ST with Hybrid Arts SmpteTrack software
  - Emulator - Emax Sampler
- Dori Caymmi - vocals on "Southern Wind"

== Charts ==
Chart (1988)	Peak position
Billboard Jazz Albums	14
