= Browne Sugar =

Studio album by Tom Browne
- Released: 1979
- Recorded: 1979
- Studio: A & R Studios (New York City, New York)
- Genre: Jazz-funk, funk, soul, jazz
- Length: 37:39
- Label: GRP
- Producer: Dave Grusin; Larry Rosen

Tom Browne chronology
Browne Sugar (1979)	Love Approach (1980)

Professional ratings
Review scores
Source	Rating
AllMusic	4/5 stars

Browne Sugar is the debut album by Tom Browne. It was released in 1979 on GRP Records and reached number six on the Jazz Albums chart in 1979.

== Track listing ==
1. "Throw Down" (Tom Browne) – 3:56
2. "I Never Was a Cowboy" (Dave Grusin) – 4:24
3. "Herbal Scent" (Marcus Miller) – 5:22
4. "Brother, Brother" (Marcus Miller) – 5:36
5. "The Closer I Get to You" (James Mtume, Reggie Lucas) – 4:38
6. "What's Going On" (Marvin Gaye, Renaldo Benson, Al Cleveland) – 5:13
7. "Promises for Spring" (Tom Browne) – 4:50
8. "Antoinette Like" (Bernard Wright) – 3:40

== Personnel ==
- Tom Browne – trumpet (1–3, 6, 7), flugelhorn (4, 5, 8)
- Dave Grusin – Oberheim Polyphonic Synthesizer (1), electric piano (2, 4–6), clavinet (2, 3), Minimoog (3, 6, 7), percussion (5, 7, 8)
- Rob Mounsey – Oberheim Polyphonic synthesizer programming, Oberheim Polyphonic synthesizer (1)
- Bernard Wright – electric piano (1, 3, 7, 8), acoustic piano (7, 8)
- Ron Dean Miller – guitars (3, 6–8)
- Marcus Miller – bass (1, 3, 7, 8)
- Francisco Centeno – bass (2, 4–6)
- Buddy Williams – drums
- Errol "Crusher" Bennett – percussion (2, 4), congas (4)
- Sue Evans – congas (3, 5, 6–8), percussion (3, 5, 6–8)
- Michael Brecker – tenor saxophone (1)
- Patti Austin – vocals (2, 4–6)
- Vivian Cherry – vocals (2, 4, 6)
- Frank Floyd – vocals (2, 4, 6)
- Zachary Sanders – vocals (2, 4, 6)

Horn and String section

- Dave Grusin – arrangements and conductor
- David Nadien – string concertmaster
- Phil Bodner, Eddie Daniels, Wally Kane and Dave Tofani – horns
- Jonathan Abramowitz, Alfred Brown, Harry Cykman, Max Ellen, Barry Finclair, Louis Gabowitz, Paul Gershman, Harry Glickman, Diana Halprin, Theodore Israel, Charles Libove, Harry Lookofsky, Charles McCraken, David Nadien, Max Pollikoff, Joseph Rabushka, Matthew Raimondi, Herbert Sorkin, Lenore Weinstock and Masako Yanagita – string players

== Production ==
- Dave Grusin – producer, liner notes
- Larry Rosen – producer, recording, mixing, liner notes
- Jim Boyer – recording, mixing
- Bradshaw Leigh – recording assistant, mix assistant
- Peter Lewis – recording assistant
- Ted Jensen – mastering at Sterling Sound (New York, NY)
- Donna Putney – GRP production coordinator
- Donn Davenport – art direction
- Maude Gilman – design
- Mario Astorga – photography

== Charts ==
Year	Album	Chart positions		
Year	Album	US	US R&B	Jazz Albums
1979	Browne Sugar	147	50	6
