= Migration (Dave Grusin album) =

Studio album by Dave Grusin
- Released: 1989
- Recorded: 1989
- Studio: Sunset Sound (Hollywood, California); Record Plant (Los Angeles, California); Smoketree Ranch (Chatsworth, California); Clinton Recording Studios (New York City, New York)
- Genre: Jazz
- Length: 62:58
- Label: GRP
- Producer: Dave Grusin, Larry Rosen

Dave Grusin chronology
The Fabulous Baker Boys (1989)	Migration (1989)	Havana (1990)

Professional ratings
Review scores
Source	Rating
AllMusic	2.5/5 stars

Migration is an album by American pianist Dave Grusin released in 1989, recorded for the GRP label. The album reached No. 1 on Billboard's Contemporary Jazz chart.

"The Suite from the Milagro Beanfield War" (tracks 10–14) received the 1990 Grammy Award for Best Arrangement of an Instrumental. Grusin's music from the movie The Milagro Beanfield War was also a 1989 Academy Award winner, and a 1988 Golden Globe nominee for Best Original Score.

== Track listing ==
All tracks composed by Dave Grusin; except where indicated

1. "Punta Del Soul" – 5:51
2. "Southwest Passage" – 5:49
3. "First Time Love" (Harvey Mason, Dave Grusin) – 4:05
4. "Western Women" (Don Grusin) – 4:58
5. "Dancing in the Township" – 6:06
6. "Old Bones" – 6:15
7. "In the Middle of the Night" – 5:52
8. "T.K.O." (Marcus Miller) – 5:47
9. "Polina" (Hugh Masekela) – 6:55

Suite from the Milagro Beanfield War:

1. "Lupita" – 1:08
2. "Coyote Angel" – 3:29
3. "Pistolero" – 1:47
4. "Milagro" – 2:35
5. "Fiesta" – 2:24

== Personnel ==
- Dave Grusin – keyboards, arrangements and conductor (10–14)
- Don Grusin – additional synthesizer programming
- Carlos Rios – guitars (6, 7)
- Marcus Miller – bass (1, 5, 8, 9)
- Abraham Laboriel – bass (2–4, 6, 10–14)
- Omar Hakim – drums (1, 5, 8, 9)
- Harvey Mason – drums (2–4, 6, 10–14)
- Michael Fisher – percussion (1–8, 10–14)
- Branford Marsalis – soprano saxophone (1), tenor saxophone (5, 8)
- Hugh Masekela – flugelhorn (5, 9)
- Gerald Vinci – concertmaster (10–14)

=== Production ===
- Larry Rosen – executive producer
- Dave Grusin – executive producer, producer, digital mixing
- Don Murray – recording, digital mixing
- Ed Rak – recording
- David Glover – additional recording
- Troy Haiderson – recording assistant
- Mike Kloster – recording assistant
- Dave Knight – recording assistant
- Jim Mitchell – recording assistant
- Tom Nellen – recording assistant
- BrIan Soucy – recording assistant
- Bob Salcedo – mix assistant
- Robert Vosigen – digital editing at CMS Digital (Pasadena, California)
- Wally Traugott – mastering at Capitol Studios (Hollywood, California)
- Suzanne Sherman – production coordinator
- Andy Baltimore – creative director, graphic design
- Lee Corey – graphic design
- David Gibb – graphic design
- Andy Ruggirello – graphic design
- Dan Serrano – graphic design
- Eric Meoia – front cover photography
- Claudia Thompson – back cover photography

== Charts ==
Chart (1989)	Peak position
US Top Contemporary Jazz Albums (Billboard)	1
