= Cinemagic (Dave Grusin album) =

Studio album by Dave Grusin
- Released: 1987
- Recorded: 1987
- Studio: Sunset Sound (Hollywood, California); The Review Room (New York City, New York); Olympic Sound Studios (London, UK)
- Genre: Jazz
- Length: 56:01
- Label: GRP
- Producer: Dave Grusin

Dave Grusin chronology
Harlequin (1985)	Cinemagic (1987)	Sticks and Stones (1988)

Cinemagic is an album by American pianist Dave Grusin released in 1987, recorded for the GRP label. The album features Grusin's work as a film composer.

== Track listing ==
All songs composed by Dave Grusin except where noted.

1. "On Golden Pond" (main theme from On Golden Pond) - 3:35
2. "New Hampshire Hornpipe" (from On Golden Pond) - 2:22
3. "Heaven Can Wait" (main theme from Heaven Can Wait) - 4:35
4. "An Actor's Life" (main theme from Tootsie) - 5:07
5. "It Might Be You" - (Dave Grusin, Alan Bergman, Marilyn Bergman) (from Tootsie) - 5:08
6. "Fratelli Chase" (from The Goonies) - 3:15
7. "The Heart is a Lonely Hunter" (from The Heart is a Lonely Hunter) - 4:40
8. "Mountain Dance" (main theme from Falling in Love) - 6:14
9. "Letting Go - T.J.'s Theme" (from The Champ) - 2:51
10. "The Champ" (main theme from The Champ) - 3:25
11. "Condor" (from Three Days of the Condor) - 4:42
12. "Goodbye for Kathy" (from Three Days of the Condor) - 3:57
13. "PLO Camp Entrance" (from The Little Drummer Girl) - 2:51
14. "Epilogue" (from The Little Drummer Girl) - 3:22

== Personnel ==
- Dave Grusin – acoustic piano, MIDI–acoustic piano, additional synthesizers, arrangements and conductor
- Don Grusin – synthesizers
- Ian Underwood – synthesizers (8)
- Lee Ritenour – acoustic guitars, electric guitars
- Jeff Mironov – electric guitars (8)
- Abraham Laboriel – electric bass
- Marcus Miller – electric bass (8)
- Harvey Mason – drums
- Michael Fisher – percussion
- Emil Richards – additional percussion, cimbalom
- Rubens Bassini – percussion (8)
- Ernie Watts – tenor saxophone, tenor sax solo (1)
- Tom Scott – soprano saxophone, tenor saxophone, soprano sax solo (3), tenor sax solo (7)
- Eddie Daniels – clarinet
- Charles Loper – trombone
- Chuck Findley – trumpet
- London Symphony Orchestra – orchestra
- Jorge Calandrelli – additional orchestrations
- Harry Rabinowitz – associate conductor
- Ashley Arbuckle – concertmaster

=== Production ===
- Larry Rosen – executive producer
- Dave Grusin – executive producer, producer, digital mixing, digital editing, liner notes
- Don Murray – track recording
- Jim Prezlosi – recording assistant
- Keith Grant – London session recording
- Gerry O'Riordan – London session recording assistant
- Josiah Gluck – digital mixing, digital editing
- Jim Singer – mix assistant, editing assistant
- Ted Jensen – mastering at Sterling Sound (New York City, New York)
- Andy Baltimore – creative director, cover design, black and white photography
- Dan Serrano – cover design
- Dave Gibb – graphic design
- David Kunze – graphic design
- Ivan Salgado – graphic design
- Doug McKenzie – black and white photography
- Glen Wexler – black and white photography
- Joseph Marvullo – album cover photography
- Sydney Pollack – liner notes

== Charts ==
Chart (1987)	Peak position
Billboard Jazz Albums	11
