= Havana (soundtrack) =

Havana (Motion Picture Soundtrack)

Soundtrack album by Dave Grusin
- Released: December 4, 1990
- Recorded: 1990
- Genre: Jazz
- Length: 41:36
- Label: GRP
- Producers: Dave Grusin, Larry Rosen

Dave Grusin chronology
Migration (1989)	Havana (Motion Picture Soundtrack) (1990)	Bonfire of the Vanities (1991)

Havana is an album by American pianist Dave Grusin released in 1990, recorded for the GRP label. This album is a soundtrack to the film Havana, directed by Sydney Pollack.

This soundtrack was a 1990 Academy Award nominee for Best Original Score, a 1990 Golden Globe nominee for Best Original Score, and a 1990 Grammy nominee for Best Score Soundtrack for Visual Media.

== Track listing ==
All tracks written by Dave Grusin except where noted

1. "Main Title" – 3:05
2. "Night Walk" – 3:26
3. "Cuba Libre ('Se Fue')" – 3:32
4. "Santa Clara Suite: Vayase" – 1:36
5. "Santa Clara Suite: Miliocia y Refugios" – 1:45
6. "Santa Clara Suite Fuego Peligroso" – 0:59
7. "Santa Clara Suite: Epilogue" – 0:54
8. "A Los Rumberos de Belén" (Roberto Nunez) – 3:56
9. "Love Theme" – 3:09
10. "Hurricane Country" – 5:01
11. "Lost in a Sweet Place" – 2:39
12. "Mambo Lido" – 3:34
13. "El Conuco" – 3:14
14. "Adios Habana" – 3:07
15. "La Academia" – 2:48

== Personnel ==
- Dori Caymmi – vocals
- Dave Grusin – piano, keyboards
- Arturo Sandoval – trumpet
- Sal Marquez – trumpet
- Don Menza – saxophone
- Dave Valentin – flute
- Clare Fischer – piano
- Lee Ritenour – guitar
- Brian Bromberg – bass
- Abraham Laboriel – bass
- Harvey Mason – drums
- Alex Acuña – percussion
- Gary Vinci – concertmaster
