= The Fabulous Baker Boys (soundtrack) =

Soundtrack album by Dave Grusin
- Released: 1989
- Recorded: 1989
- Studios: Sunset Sound, Los Angeles, California
- Genre: Jazz
- Length: 43:47
- Label: GRP
- Producers: Dave Grusin, Joel Sill

Dave Grusin chronology
Collection (1989)	The Fabulous Baker Boys (1989)	Migration (1989)

The Fabulous Baker Boys is an album by American pianist Dave Grusin released in 1989, recorded for the GRP label. This album is the soundtrack to the motion picture The Fabulous Baker Boys directed by Steve Kloves. The album reached No. 3 on Billboard's Jazz chart.

Grusin's score received numerous accolades, including a 1989 Academy Award nomination for Best Original Score, a 1990 Golden Globe nomination for Best Original Score, a 1990 nomination for the BAFTA Award for Best Film Music, and was the 1990 Grammy winner for the best score soundtrack for visual media. Grusin's arrangement of "My Funny Valentine," sung by Michelle Pfeiffer, won the 1990 Grammy for Best Arrangement, Instrumental and Vocals. According to a survey conducted by Billboard, The Fabulous Baker Boys was the fifth best-selling jazz album of 1989.

== Track listing ==
All tracks written by Dave Grusin except where noted

1. "Main Title – Jack's Theme" - 6:40
2. "Welcome to the Road" - 5:33
3. "Makin' Whoopee" (Walter Donaldson, Gus Kahn) - 3:09
4. "Suzie and Jack" - 5:00
5. "Shop Till You Bop" - 4:35
6. "Soft on Me" - 2:30
7. "Do Nothing till You Hear from Me" (Duke Ellington, Bob Russell) - 3:26
8. "The Moment of Truth" - 3:55
9. "Moonglow" (Irving Mills, Eddie DeLange) - 3:25
10. "Lullaby of Birdland" (George Shearing, George David Weiss) - 2:32
11. "My Funny Valentine" (Richard Rodgers, Lorenz Hart) - 3:02

== Personnel ==
- Dave Grusin – Fender Rhodes electric piano, piano, synthesizer, conductor
- Ernie Watts – saxophone
- Sal Marquez – trumpet
- Lee Ritenour – guitar
- Brian Bromberg, J. J. Wiggins, Ernie McDaniel – bass
- Harvey Mason, Rocky White, Gene Krupa, Earl Palmer – drums
- Michelle Pfeiffer – vocals
- Norris Turney, The Mariano-Dodgion Sextet – alto saxophone
- The Mariano-Dodgion Sextet, Charles Owens, Eddie Daniels, Herman Riley, Benny Goodman – clarinet
- Charles Owens – bass clarinet
- Mercer Ellington – conductor
- Roland Hanna, Teddy Wilson, Karen Hernandez – piano
- Eddie Daniels, Herman Riley – tenor saxophone
- Al Grey, Britt Woodman – trombone
- Chuck Connors – bass trombone
- Barry Lee Hall, Clark Terry, Lew Soloff, Ron Tooley – trumpet, flugelhorn
- Lionel Hampton – vibraphone, vocals

== Charts ==
Chart (1989–1990)	Peak position
Australian Albums (ARIA Charts)	90
US Billboard Jazz Albums	3
