= List of Tenkai Knights episodes =

Tenkai Knights (テンカイナイト, Tenkai Naito) is a Canadian-Japanese anime series, produced by Shogakukan-Shueisha Productions, Spin Master and TV Tokyo and animated by Bones. The anime revolves around four teenage humans named Guren, Ceylan, Toxsa, and Chooki, who find an interdimensional portal to Quarton where they are chosen by the Guardians to become the new generation of Tenkai Knights and prevent Vilius from taking control of both worlds.

The anime first aired in both the United States and Canada through Cartoon Network and Teletoon on August 24, 2013. It was later aired in Japan on TV Tokyo beginning April 5, 2014.

Four theme songs are used for the series: one opening theme and four closing themes. The opening theme is "Get the Glory" by Ayako Nakanomori. The first ending theme is "Shunkan Diamond" (瞬間Diamond; lit. 'Diamond Moment') by Rurika Yokoyama, while the second ending is "Shōri no Hanataba o -gonna gonna be hot!-" (勝利の花束を -gonna gonna be hot!-, lit. 'Victory Bouquet -gonna gonna be hot!-') by Cyntia. The third ending, "Densetsu no FLARE" (伝説のFLARE, lit. 'Legendary Flare'), is sung by Pile. The fourth ending, "Tokenai CANDY" (溶けないCANDY, lit. 'Unmelting Candy'), is sung by Gacharic Spin.

== Episode list ==
No.	English title Japanese title	Directed by	Written by	Original release date	Japanese air date
1	"Two Worlds" / "Enter Braven the Brave!"; Transliteration: "Yūsha Bureivun arawaru!" (Japanese: 勇者ブレイヴンあらわる！)	Mitsuru Hongo	Jin Kanada	August 24, 2013	April 5, 2014
Guren Nash moves to Benham City with his father, a very busy man, who often has to move to other cities due to his work. At his new school, he is peeved by his new classmate Ceylan Jones. After school they enter into talks and even call them dudes and go through the city. They stop at the mysterious "Shop of Wonders" owned by Mr. White, which didn't have customers for one month. The owner shows them two mysterious items, one of them Guren turns into a robot. Mr. White gives them the robots free of charge. In his room Guren wants to come behind the mystery of the robot, but isn't successful. While sleeping he has a dream, where Vilius and Bravenwolf fight each other and Bravenwolf is defeated. In school he tells Ceylan about this dream and finds out that Ceylan had the same dream. After school they return to the shop, but Mr. White appears to be not there. While searching for him in the basement, they notice that their robots are shining and a big robot begins moving and chases them into a mysterious machine. Guren awakes on Quarton and is now in the armor of Bravenwolf. He can't believe that but his armor's built-in Artificial Intelligence guides him to search Ceylan, who now have become Tributon. They are attacked by an army who serves Vilius. After they get their weapons they defeat the army. At the same time Vilius hears about the return of his enemies, and commands his servants to defeat and capture them. While fleeing another army attack, Guren and Ceylan got outside into the daylight, but the army still follows them. They are defeated by another allied army, who recognizes them as the legendary Tenkai Knights. After that Guren and Ceylan are thrown back to Earth.
2	"Tenkai Dragon Cube" / "The Secret of the Tenkai Dragon"; Transliteration: "Tenkai Doragon no Himitsu" (Japanese: テンカイドラゴンの秘密)	Masahiro Sonoda	Jin Kanada	August 31, 2013	April 12, 2014
After their first trip to Quarton, Mr. White and The Guardian fill them in on Quarton's history. Ceylan refuses to return to Quarton, but Guren insists they've been summoned to protect both worlds from destruction. During a visit to the museum, the two boys see an ancient stone tablet that later turns into a key in front of them. After this event, they are summoned to go back to Quarton, where they meet Granox and Slyger, two of Vilius' most powerful warriors, while Lydendor and Valorn join the fight, getting the first Dragon Cube.
3	"The Rising Fire" / "The Four Heroes"; Transliteration: "4-nin no Yūsha" (Japanese: 4人の勇者)	Yō Miura	Jin Kanada	September 7, 2013	April 19, 2014
Guren and Ceylan track down and meet Chooki and Toxsa, the two other Earth boys who possess cores and became Tenkai Knights on Quarton! Their friendship gets off to a bumpy start, but in the end, they all agree on working together to achieve victory after finding the third Dragon Cube.
4	"The Power of Four" / "Combine! Fire Bird"; Transliteration: "Gattai! Faiā Bādo" (Japanese: 合体！ファイヤーバード)	Masahiro Sonoda	Ryūshirō Narutomi	September 14, 2013	April 26, 2014
The boys (Guren, Ceylan, Toxsa, and Chookie) are starting come together as a team as they learn more about Quarton. When the guardian tells about robofusion (combining their Tenkai Knights to become something even more powerful), the boys start to practice syncing up (like ordering the same drink in Toxsa's diner) in order to achieve that power. Even Toxsa's sister, Wakamei, gets in on the fun. When Ceylan reaches home, his dad breaks to him the bad news: they have to move due to some work issues. While in Mr White's shop, about to break the news to his friends, they all are summoned to Quarton in search of the next Dragon cube. After some failed attempts, Ceylan finally breaks the news to the gang, with a heartfelt scene of gratitude, and soon after, they combine together and form the Prodojet, due to robofusion. After 2 weeks back on Earth, Guren misses his friend, when suddenly, his friend comes back, revealing that he is not moving after all. Later, the guys learn that someone stole the Key from the museum, possibly for Villius.
5	"Vilius Revealed" / "The Strongest Enemy, Vilius"; Transliteration: "Saikyō no Teki Viriusu" (Japanese: 最強の敵ヴィリウス)	Ikurō Satō	Shakeko Samon	September 21, 2013	May 3, 2014
As the four heroes gain confidence after having gained another cube of the Tenkai Dragon, Vilius decides to make his epic presence felt. The Guardian warns the four about the danger of being over-confident, but the boys aren't really listening.
6	"The Tenkai Kid" / "A New Power, X-Mode!"; Transliteration: "Arata na Chikara, X Mōdo!" (Japanese: 新たな力、Xモード！)	Masahiro Sonoda	Jin Kanada	September 28, 2013	May 10, 2014
The boys asked Mr. White who manages the Earth side of the portal, an intriguing thrift store, for some Quarton help, but he says he'll only help them if they agree to help him in the store. Believing in Mr. White's procedure, Guren unlocks his Titan Mode for the first time.
7	"Tributon Extreme" / "Ceylan's Desperate Battle!"; Transliteration: "Seiran, Kesshi no Tatakai" (Japanese: セイラン、決死の戦い！)	Yō Miura	Ryūshirō Narutomi	October 5, 2013	May 17, 2014
A mysterious new student arrives in Benham City while on Quarton, Tributon fights to achieve Tenkai Titan mode. In the end, the Tenkai Knights face the appearance of Dromus, an evil clone of Bravenwolf who takes the fourth Dragon Cube with him.
8	"Chooki's Mojo" / "Get Back the Luck!"; Transliteration: "Un o torimodose!" (Japanese: 運をとりもどせ！)	Kōhei Hatano	Jin Kanada	October 12, 2013	May 24, 2014
Chooki has always been good at sports, school, and, well, everything. But in order to save Toxsa, Chooki gets himself jinxed and becomes clumsy and unable to do what he's best at. The four travel back to Quarton, where Chooki unlocks his Titan Mode while overcoming the jinx.
9	"Valley of Secrets" / "Guided By Beag"; Transliteration: "Bīgu no Michibiki" (Japanese: ビーグの導き)	Ikurō Satō	Shakeko Samon	October 19, 2013	May 31, 2014
Commander Beag sacrifices himself to save the Tenkai Knights from falling down, causing them to develop a new Robofusion. They soon find out Beag is trapped in the Valley of Secrets and go to rescue him. They also find the fifth and last Dragon Cube inside the Valley.
10	"Toxsa 2.0" / "I Ain't Gonna Try!"; Transliteration: "Ore wa doryoku nante shinē!!" (Japanese: 俺は努力なんてしね〜！)	Kōhei Hatano	Ryūshirō Narutomi	October 26, 2013	June 7, 2014
Jealous of his teammates all being able to achieve Titan Mode, Toxsa travels to Quarton to train in secret. Meanwhile, Vilius sends out an attack and Toxsa is captured. The other Tenkai knights travel to Quarton to save Toxsa. After realizing he needs his friends, he goes Titan and forces Vilius' forces to retreat.
11	"Two Sides to Every Coin" / "Reversal! Good and Evil"; Transliteration: "Hanten! Zen to Aku" (Japanese: 反転！善と悪)	Yō Miura	Jin Kanada	November 2, 2013	June 21, 2014
On Earth, Guren receives Gen's advice about "choosing the side he wants". Meanwhile, the Corekai decide to infiltrate into the Dark Fortress to find the last Dragon Cube. But Dromus is equipped with a Core Corrupter to make the Corekai evil. Remembering Gen's advice, the Knights are able to turn their allies back to their old selves, causing Dromus to retreat. The heroes finally get all Dragon Cubes. Back on Earth, Guren's computer receives a message telling he is one of the "keys" that awake the Tenkai Dragon.
12	"Dragon's Key" / "Run, Guren!"; Transliteration: "Hashire! Guren" (Japanese: 走れ！グレン)	Masahiro Sonoda	Jin Kanada	November 9, 2013	June 28, 2014
The gang splits into two groups, Guren and Chooki try to find a clue about the White Dragon Key. They find a sign which takes them to another and another (at one of these signs they spot Gen). They finally arrive at the Key and have to go through booby traps. Guren finally gets through and takes the key. Meanwhile Toxsa and Ceylan are fighting such a hard battle they have to go Titan mode. They seem to be holding the Corrupted off but more keep coming. Suddenly Dromus shows up in the end and says that everything is going according to his plan.
13	"Vilius Unleashed" / "The Great Decisive Battle"; Transliteration: "Daikessen" (Japanese: 大決戦)	Ikurō Satō	Ryūshirō Narutomi	November 16, 2013	July 5, 2014
Following the battle located in the Dragon's Nest, Guren and Chooki travel to Quarton with Boreas, where the five Cubes are combined into one giant cube that can be only opened with the Dragon Key, awakening the Tenkai Dragon. However, Dromus captures it in a trap and transports it to the Corrupted headquarters. During the fight, Guren reveals his human identity to Vilius before destroying him. In the aftermath, Vilius revives and swears to conquer Quarton and Earth.
14	"Lost Key" / A Step into the Future! Transliteration: "Mirai e no Ippo!" (Japanese: 未来への一歩！)	Nobuharu Kamanaka	Jin Kanada	November 23, 2013	July 12, 2014
Vilius has kidnapped the Tenkai Dragon and Guren tries to figure out their next move. On Earth, a stranger returns to Benham City.
15	"Tenkai Rogue" / "Formidable Enemy! Enter Venetta"; Transliteration: "Kyōteki! Venetta Tōjō" (Japanese: 強敵！ヴェネッタ登場)	Yō Miura	Jin Kanada	November 30, 2013	July 19, 2014
Beni and Gen scheme on Earth for a way to distract Guren from the other boys. On Quarton, a new villain named Venetta is revealed.
16	"Oh No, I Didn't" / "Why We Fight"; Transliteration: "Ore-tachi no Tatakau Riyū" (Japanese: 俺たちの戦う理由)	Masahiro Sonoda	Jin Kanada	December 7, 2013	July 26, 2014
Ceylan's self-doubt leads him to wonder what skills he brings to the team. Is he the best Tenkai Knight he can be?
17	"Robofusion!" / "Fish Up, Chooki!"; Transliteration: "Tsuriagero! Chūki" (Japanese: 釣りあげろ！チュウキ)	Takurō Tsukada	Ryūshirō Narutomi	January 4, 2014	August 2, 2014
On Earth, Mr. White takes the boys fishing. Everybody catches a fish, except Chooki. He takes this pretty bad and wants to keep trying until he catches one. Meanwhile on Quarton, Vilius and the Corrupted can finally withdraw the Tenkai Dragon's energy. Granox, Slyger, a corrupted soldier named Shadius, and a Sho can robofuse as well. At the same time, Boreas and the other Corekai mention that the balance of Tenkai energy is unbalanced.
18	"The Key to Evil" / "Activate XX-Mode!"; Transliteration: "Hatsudō! XX Mōdo!!" (Japanese: 発動！XXモード！！)	Masahiro Sonoda	Jin Kanada	January 11, 2014	August 9, 2014
Beni tricks the Knights to travel to Quarton into a trap. Another Guardian named Eurus appears to be helping her and Gen to keep balance because Boreas is helping the Knights. The Knights on Quarton have to battle evil clones of themselves created by Eurus. Meanwhile on Earth, Gen begins to get suspicions of Mr. White. The Knights unlock Titan Fusion and Bravenwolf and Tributan destroy the clones. Beni is surprised that they won and realizes she shouldn't under-estimate them. Dromus and Eurus talk about how to use the Tenkai Knight's Titan Fusion to find the Black Key.
19	"Extreme Titan" / "I'm a Hero!"; Transliteration: "Ore wa Yūsha da!" (Japanese: 俺は勇者だ！)	Yō Miura	Ryūshirō Narutomi	January 18, 2014	August 16, 2014
Wakamei starts to wonder where Toxsa has been spending all his time. She follows him to Mr. White's shop to discover his secret. Meanwhile, the Corekai and the Corrupted clash in a mine to obtain a tablet that is located there.
20	"Double Crossed" / "The Mystery of Gen"; Transliteration: "Gen no nazo" (Japanese: ゲンの謎)	Nobuharu Kamanaka	Jin Kanada	January 25, 2014	August 23, 2014
Ceylan has a run-in with Gen. When on Quarton, the Tenkai Knights do battle against some of Dromus' experiments. Meanwhile, Vilius furthers his plans to absorb the Tenkai Dragon's Tenkai Energy. At the same time, the Guardians meet to discuss the recent events.
21	"Checkmate" / "Closed Contest! Intellectual Battle"; Transliteration: "Daisessen! Zunō Batoru" (Japanese: 大接戦！頭脳バトル)	Takurō Tsukada	Ryūshirō Narutomi	February 1, 2014	August 30, 2014
Gen attempts to shatter Chooki's confidence and make him the "weak link" among the Tenkai Knights.
22	"Dromus Betrayed" / "Venetta's Betrayal"; Transliteration: "Venetta no Uragiri" (Japanese: ヴェネッタの裏切り)	Masahiro Sonoda	Jin Kanada	February 8, 2014	August 9, 2014
Venetta and Dromus appear to have a falling out, later Beni reveals her identity as Venetta to Guren and the others. Meanwhile, Boreas and the other Guardians engage Vilius and the Corrupted in a battle to protect the portal to Earth.
23	"Dragon Key Quest" / "Obtain the Key to Black Heaven!"; Transliteration: "Te ni irero! Kuroten no Kagi" (Japanese: 手に入れろ！黒天の鍵)	Yō Miura	Jin Kanada	February 15, 2014	September 6, 2014
With the help of Beni, the Tenkai Knights discover the location of the Black Dragon Key.
24	"The Battle Begins" / "The Night Before the Showdown"; Transliteration: "Kessen Zenya" (Japanese: 決戦前夜)	Masahiro Sonoda	Ryūshirō Narutomi	February 22, 2014	September 13, 2014
With Gen and Beni's identities revealed and the Black Dragon Key lost, the Tenkai Knights prepare for the ultimate battle.
25	"The Dark Unlock" / "Gen's Shocking Past!"; Transliteration: "Shōgeki! Gen no kako" (Japanese: 衝撃！ゲンの過去)	Takanori Yano	Jin Kanada	March 1, 2014	September 20, 2014
Bravenwolf is locked in a fierce battle with Dromus for the Black Dragon Key, but Vilius takes the key and uses it to awake the Tenkai Dragon's evil side.
26	"A New Knight" / "Conclusion! The Strongest Mode"; Transliteration: "Kecchaku! Saikyo Mōdo" (Japanese: 決着！最強モード)	Nobuharu Kamanaka	Jin Kanada	March 8, 2014	September 27, 2014
The Tenkai Knights take on Vilius and the Tenkai Dragon's evil side in an epic battle. Dromus decides to join Bravenwolf alongside the other Guardians. The Dragon is split back into five cubes that fuse with the Knights (and Dromus), gaining the Phoenix mode with the power to destroy Vilius for good and restore the portal.
27	"Vilius Returns" / "A New Battle"; Transliteration: "Arata naru tatakai" (Japanese: 新たなる戦い)	Mitsuru Hongo; Daigo Yamagishi	Hiroshi Ōnogi	March 15, 2014	October 4, 2014
Due to the Guardians' incompetence, they've resurrected Vilius only to have been put under his control. As the Tenkai Knights fight Vilius, he stole the five Dragon Cubes and forced them to create the Tenkai Dragon without either the white or black Dragon Keys rendering the beast unstable. As Dromus strike the Tenkai Dragon, it split into ten cubes where five of the cubes represents its natural Tenkai energy while the other five represents the corrupted Tenkai energy.
28	"Elemental Knights" / "The Oncoming Slyger"; Transliteration: "Semari kuru Suraigā" (Japanese: 迫りくるスライガー)	Masahiro Sonoda	Hiroshi Ōnogi	March 22, 2014	October 11, 2014
The Tenkai Knights discover the energy they absorbed has altered their appearances, granting them new powers. In the meantime, Vilius uses the Guardians' portal to send Slyger to Earth in order to find and destroy the Tenkai Knights in their human forms.
29	"No "I" in Team" / "Liar"; Transliteration: "Usotsuki" (Japanese: うそつき)	Takanori Yano	Yūichi Nomura	March 29, 2014	October 18, 2014
Guren is very excited about the upcoming trip to the Wonder Park with his father. Mr. Nash, his father, unexpectedly cancels the trip due to having a busy schedule at work leaving Guren depressed, saying he would never believe him again. Guren soon believes that his father doesn't want to hang out with him and says he has work as an excuse. As a result, Mr. Nash gets Guren tickets to the soccer finals. Before the finals begin the Tenkai Knights are summoned. Ceylan allows Guren to skip it and instead go to the game with his father. At the game Guren and Mr. Nash are talking about teamwork when Guren leaves the championship to help his friends remembering the true meaning of teamwork. After helping his friends defeat the enemy Guren meets his dad asking if the game is over. His dad tells him otherwise and both play a game of soccer together.
30	"Corrupted Earth" / "Ceylan in the Crosshairs"; Transliteration: "Nerawareta seiran" (Japanese: ねらわれたセイラン)	Masahiro Sonoda	Nobuaki Yamaguchi	April 5, 2014	October 25, 2014
Vilius sends Granox to Earth in order to get revenge on Tributon.
31	"Dojo Mojo" / "The Black Guardian is Born!"; Transliteration: "Burakkugādian tanjō!" (Japanese: ブラックガーディアン誕生！)	Yō Miura	Hiroshi Ōnogi	April 12, 2014	November 1, 2014
After the Guardians were brainwashed by Vilius' black Dragon Cubes, the Tenkai Knights must learn how to defeat them. That's why Gen decides to train them in his Dojo with Mr. White's help. Back on Quarton, Boreas unleashes his Mega Fusion form, and in the last moment, Guren unlocks Bravenwolf's Elemental Titan mode.
32	"Toxic Toxsa" / "One Who Leads"; Transliteration: "Rīdā taru mono" (Japanese: リーダーたる者)	Nobuharu Kamanaka	Yūichi Nomura	April 19, 2014	November 8, 2014
Beni convinces Toxsa that he should be the leader instead of Guren, and Guren doesn't seem to mind. Unfortunately Toxsa's exploits as a leader lead to nothing but trouble both on earth and Quarton. When guardian Zephyrus appears, Guren tries and fails to access his Elemental Titan mode. Can Toxsa pull it together and unlock Valorn Terrablast's Elemental Titan mode?
33	"Flight Knight" / "The Tenkai Knights Split Up!"; Transliteration: "Bunretsu! Tenkainaito" (Japanese: 分裂！テンカイナイト)	Hiroki Negishi	Nobuaki Yamaguchi	April 26, 2014	November 15, 2014
When the gang try a whack-a-mole style practice exercise inside a large room where snakes pop out in every direction, Ceylan manages to beat Chooki's score. This causes a rift in the four friends, Chooki can't admit he lost to Ceylan, Ceylan can't help rubbing it in, and an offhand comment by Guren has Toxsa angry at him. When Granox and Slyger end up hunting the team on Earth, can they put their differences aside and send them back to Quarton? When Guardian Notus arrives on the scene and fuses into a giant snake, it's up to Chooki to unlock his Lydendor Tenkai Lightning Strike Titan mode, since Guren seems to still be unable to access his...
34	"Beware Betrayal" / "Block Flower"; Transliteration: "Burokku no hana" (Japanese: ブロックの花)	Tomoaki Koshida	Hiroshi Ōnogi	May 3, 2014	November 22, 2014
Venetta is holding an audience with Vilius when he reveals that the key to the Tenkai fortress is the Tenkai stone, which is on Earth. In her apartment Beni opens a cube her dad left her revealing a glowing pink stone which she takes to Quarton. After activating the stone a giant arching crystal bridge appears in the sky. Back on Earth, the core bricks of Guren and his friends give off a distress signal prompting them to visit Mr. White's shop. There a strange phenomenon known as Brickification turns a Teapot, part of a table and a picture frame into brittle objects composed of tiny bricks. Mr. White shows the teens that their core bricks can temporarily restore objects to their pre-brick form, but the only solution is on Quarton. The team go to Quarton and face Granox, who's digging for the Tenkai Fortress, and defeat him. Back on Earth, Beni confronts Guren and tells him that his friends are only holding him back. Later after receiving another distress signal the Brickification seems to be spreading throughout the city, and when the team head back to Quarton they have to deal with both Slyger and Venetta. Can Bravenwolf and Tributon's friendship help Tributon unlock his Ice blast Titan mode?
35	"Feeling the Heat" / "Revive! Sigma Mode"; Transliteration: "Yomigaere! Σ mōdo" (Japanese: よみがえれ！Σモード)	Daigo Yamagishi	Naohiro Fukushima	May 10, 2014	November 29, 2014
Guren is feeling down since he seems to be the only knight unable to access Titan mode. Mr White gives the team a speech on pressure, which leads Toxsa, Chooki, and Ceylan to believe that Guren is suffering from performance anxiety, and that they should do everything they can to relieve him of any pressure. Meanwhile Gen feels the reason Guren is unable to transform is because he isn't under enough pressure. Guren seeks out the advice of his friends, who in a bid to not pressure him, promptly change the subject or outright avoid the topic of Quarton. This leads Guren to ask Gen if he'll join the team full-time, to which he answers he has his own path to follow. Back on Quarton, Guardian Eurus transforms into a giant dragon like form and manages to take down Tributon, Lydendor, and Valorn in Elemental Tenkai Titan mode. Just as Bravenwolf is about to be attacked Dromus appears and takes the hit. The pressure is on, can Bravenwolf transform into Tenkai Fireblast mode and save the day?
36	"Hang Tenkai" / "True Friendship"; Transliteration: "Hontō no yūjō" (Japanese: 本当の友情)	Hiroki Negishi	Yūichi Nomura	May 17, 2014	December 6, 2014
On Quarton, Slygar and Granox have found the Tenkai fortress and are arguing about who will take Vilius to it. On Earth Toxa gets a new skateboard, which prompts Guren to do chores, and ace a test in order to get one of his own from his dad. When Ceylan accidentally ends up destroying the board, Guren enters the next battle on Quarton and is too angry to make good decisions, especially when Vilius has upgraded Granox's War Stallion into an Ice Rhino. Will Guren suck it in and start taking the advice of his teammates, especially when he can shape shift a volt-jet into Flame Phoenix mode?
37	"Fortress Revealed" / "The Promise with Kiro"; Transliteration: "Kīro to no yakusoku" (Japanese: キイロとの約束)	Masahiro Sonoda	Akiko Waba	May 24, 2014	December 13, 2014
Inside the cave the Knights discover the Tenkai Fortress behind a barrier that they are unable to penetrate. Unable to find any solution they return to Earth where Guren suggests a brainstorming session at his place, Chooki accepts, but says he will have to bring a friend. His friend turns out to be his cousin Kiro, a small girl who Chooki is babysitting. When Chooki gets called away to fill in for a soccer player the three of them are forced to watch Kiro with predictable results. On Quarton, Vilius transforms Slygar's Sky Griffin into the Fire Raptor. This causes Brickification to happen on earth, including Kiro's doll Sandy. Chooki returns from the soccer match and Ceylan in an effort to calm Kiro down shows her that Sandy is still OK by using his core brick to restore the doll, which immediately returns to brick form once he removes the brick. Kiro takes Ceylan's core brick and runs off, prompting a search of the house ending in a standoff with Kiro locking herself in the bathroom. Can Ceylan get his core brick back to stop Vilius and Slygar from retaking the Tenkai Fortress by shape shifting a BlasTank into an Ice Walker?
Recap	"Looking Forward, Looking Back"	N/A	N/A	May 31, 2014	N/A
The Tenkai Knights look back at their past battles and fights, to try and think of a way to open the Tenkai Fortress.
38	"Dragon²" / "Fierce Battle! Tenkai Fortress"; Transliteration: "Gekitō! Tenkai fōtoresu" (Japanese: 激闘！テンカイフォートレス)	Yō Miura	Nobuaki Yamaguchi	September 6, 2014	December 20, 2014
Vilius harshly berates Granox and Slyger, saying whoever controls the Fortress controls the two worlds, and for that reason it needs to be recaptured, but he will lead the attack himself. When Slyger asks about what he and Granox should do, Vilius tells them to try being helpful for once. Meanwhile at Mr. White's shop, with Guren and the Knights recapping how they found the Fortress, but can't get anywhere near it. Mr. White suggests they could penetrate the force field if they increased their Tenkai Energies somehow. However, he himself doesn't know how. Later, Guren explains how the fortress is connected to a Brickification problem, and if they don't penetrate the force field soon, it'll come back again. The Knights' methods for increasing their Energies: Guren "trains" with Max (& later with Gen), Chooki goes fishing, Ceylan falls asleep at his laptop, and Toxsa, who is incredibly paranoid due to Chooki and Ceylan's Brickification jokes, freaks out upon seeing anything square shaped. Gen, believing that Beni has a key to open the Tenkai Fortress, goes to her apartment to confront her about it, but she ends up mocking him for this, asking him if he's joined the Knights and calling him soft, and Gen gives up on trying to get information out her. As he leaves, Beni warns him, telling him not to be surprised when his new friends let him down, because they will let him down, sooner or later. After Gen leaves, Beni takes out her Fortress key and dismisses the thought of having friends when she has the key. When Vilius tries to seize the Fortress, a battle ensues. Dromus is nearly offed by Villius, much to the watching Venetta's concern, only to be saved by Bravenwolf. Bravenwolf then uses his Tenkai Firesword on Vilius after Gen distracts the Corrupted leader. When Vilius assembles the Evil Tenkai Dragon and the Knights and Dromus use their own Dragon Cubes to create the Good Tenkai Dragon, both dragons clash and their attacks collide with each other in a stalemate. However, the two dragons' power cause a massive explosion that covers all of Quarton. In the aftermath, Guren wakes up, and sees that Quarton has become jungle-like. He calls out for Ceylan, Gen and the others, but no one answers, and the episode ends on a cliffhanger.
39	"Welcome to the Jungle" / "Big Adventure in Saruraruland"; Transliteration: "Sarurarurando no daibōken" (Japanese: サルラルランドの大冒険)	Hiroki Negishi	Yūichi Nomura	September 13, 2014	December 27, 2014
Following the huge blast of energy released by the two dragons, the knights find that they, Venetta, Vilius, and some of the corrupted have all been transported to a strange planet. An unseen being calling itself Beast King soon tells them the planet is called Beast World. When Bravenwolf complains that they are on an important mission, the Beast King says he'll allow them to leave after completing a mission for him first. An ape like Corekai soon cuts the ground out from underneath the warriors, causing them to fall into a pit. Suddenly Guren and the knights find themselves in their earth forms, stuck dealing with a reality warping monkey calling itself Orangor. The Knights soon run into Beag, and after completing tasks given to them by Orangor are allowed to return to the surface. Realizing that the Beast King only wants to be entertained, Bravenwolf sets up a Tenkai soccer match between the Knights, assisted by Venetta and Vilius, assisted by the corrupted. Will the knights beat the cheating Vilius, or be stuck on Beast World forever?
40	"The Race is On" / "Tenkai Quest IV"; Transliteration: "Tenkaikuesuto IV" (Japanese: テンカイクエストIV)	Nobuharu Kamanaka	Naohiro Fukushima	September 20, 2014	January 10, 2015
Underground and in their human forms team Tenkai and Beag take part in a live action role playing game compete with rubber weapons and NPC versions of Granox and Slyger as enemies and Mr. White as an innkeeper all in an effort to save the lovely "princess" Beni, and claim the Mysterious Treasure from a giant stuffed rabbit. Then it's a race in new fusion forms. Bravenwolf, Tributon and Beag as the Acceler-Strike. Lydendor, Vlorn, and an unspecified animal knight as the Verta-Scream. Venetta and two other animals in the snake like Brave-racer. Vilius as the Flying Dagger-Scramjet. Two Beast soldiers Gorilix and Gorzad also join the race in the Bolt-Blitzer round out the roster with a "wish" given to the victor. Will the Tenkai Knights be able to win the race and return home? Or will Vilius win and take over the Tenkai fortress?
41	"Monkey in the City" / "Another Earth?"; Transliteration: "Mō hitotsu no chikyū?" (Japanese: もうひとつの地球？)	Hiroki Negishi	TAMA	September 27, 2014	January 17, 2015
After attempting to force their way off Beast Planet, the Knights find themselves in a copy of earth with the only other inhabitants being Beag, Granox, Slyger, Orangar and a backwards version of Mr. White called Mr. Black. The first Mission is catch Mr. Black who gives the team the run around. Then it's back to the surface for the Great Robofusion Race 2.0
42	"Ape Knight" / "Solve the Mystery! The Lost Jungle"; Transliteration: "Nazo o toke! Mayoi no janguru" (Japanese: 謎を解け！迷いのジャングル)	Daigo Yamagishi	Akiko Waba	October 4, 2014	January 24, 2015
The Tenkai Warriors go bananas when Guren is turned into a monkey bot. To escape the jungle this time, they must find him and change him back, but the only clue they have is something Beni does not understand. After that, it is back to the surface for the Great Robofusion Race 2.0! Or is it 3.0?
43	"Scorpidon" / "Life-Risking Tag"; Transliteration: "Inochigake no onigokko" (Japanese: 命がけの鬼ごっこ)	Masahiro Sonoda	Hiroshi Ōnogi	October 11, 2014	January 31, 2015
Finding themselves in Benham City again, this time covered in blue spots, the knights and Beag meet Orangor who has another challenge for them. They refuse to do the challenge at first after doing so many challenges but agree when Orangor promises that this is the last one. The challenge is to grab the flag off of Orangor's head but if he touches one of knights they turn to stone. Despite losing all of his friends, Guren with Beni's help was able to win. Back in Beast World as they are about to begin another race, Bravenwolf refuses and demands to see the Beast King. Revealing himself to the knights, the Beast King Scorpidon attacks the Tenkai Knights despite them not wanting to fight. Can the Knights defeat Scorpidon and will they finally be able to return home?
44	"Red and Black" / "Unleashed Black Whirlwind"; Transliteration: "Hanatareta kuro no senpū" (Japanese: 放たれた黒の旋風)	Yō Miura	Nobuaki Yamaguchi	October 18, 2014	February 7, 2015
Now back on Quarton, the knights continue their battle with Villus from where they left off. But Villus retreats when he accidentally hits the Tenkai Fortress causing it to create a barrier protecting itself. Back on earth, Guren and the others decide to take a break from their battles and have a barbecue (which becomes complicated when Gen is invited by Mr. White, and Beni also crashes the party). But they have to cut their break short when the Corrupted (with Venetta) begin another attack to claim the Tenkai Fortress.
45	"The Four Beags" / "Fed Up With Fakes?!"; Transliteration: "Nisemono wa korigori!?" (Japanese: ニセモノはこりごり！？)	Hiroki Negishi	Naohiro Fukushima; Hiroshi Ōnogi	October 25, 2014	February 14, 2015
A dastardly scheme on Vilius' part sees three of the Corrupted Guardians mimic Beag's form, which leads the real Beag to doubt his abilities. Meanwhile, on Earth, Slyger camouflages himself as Mr. Uso, a fun teacher who educates kids in funny ways. His alternative motive, however, was to spy on Guren and Ceylan to see if they knew anything about the Tenkai Stone. What is this stone, and could it really be the key to unlocking the Tenkai Fortress?
46	"Heart Turns to Stone" / "Tao and tsukikage" Transliteration: "tao to tsukikage" (Japanese: キイロとベニ)	Nobuharu Kamanaka	Yūichi Nomura	November 1, 2014	February 21, 2015
Yuki asks fubuki (and later, tsukikage) to look after his partner Tao. While on the job, tsukikage learns something about himself. When the evil Kings attack the beast Palace again, shinobi helps the Beasts save the day, betraying shu and the emperors.
47	"Too Close to Home" / "Fear of Darkfication"; Transliteration: "Daku-ka no Kyōfu" (Japanese: テトラ化の恐怖)	Daigo Yamagishi	Hiroshi Ōnogi	November 8, 2014	February 28, 2015
Vilius is angry that Venetta has betrayed him. He realizes that Venetta has the Tenkai Stone and vows revenge against her. Granox travels to Earth to attack her but she is rescued by Guren and his friends. Later Guren discovers that his father has been affected by Brickification. He along with his friends travels to Quarton to change his father back. But Bravenwolf in his anger and determination to save his father leads his fellow knights into a trap.
48	"A New Element" / "The Fifth Tenkai Knight"; Transliteration: "5-ninme no Tenkai Naito" (Japanese: 5人目のテンカイナイト)	Hiroki Negishi	Nobuaki Yamaguchi	November 15, 2014	March 7, 2015
Vilius has an idea of how to find the Tenkai Stone: he will let the knights find it for him and when they use it to open the fortress, He and his corrupted soldiers will attack. Dromus appears and challenges Vilius to a battle. Despite his best efforts, Dromus loses and he escapes. Meanwhile, Kiro who was playing with her toys finds the Tenkai Stone and, remembering what Beni told her about it being a lucky charm, decides to fulfill her promise to her and give it to Guren. When the Guardians attack the Tenkai Fortress the knights show up to try to defend it. Dromus appears and fights the guardians but they easily defeat him and mock him for fighting alone. Bravenwolf and the others defend Dromus and he realizes that he needs his friends. Working together the knights defeat the Guardians and drive them away from the fortress.
49	"Toxsa Blocked" / "Final Battle Looms"; Transliteration: "Kessen no toki semaru" (Japanese: 決戦の時せまる)	Masahiro Sonoda	Yūichi Nomura	November 22, 2014	March 14, 2015
With the Tenkai Stone the Tenkai Knights finally open the fortress and the Corekai begin to explore it. In the human world, Guren and his friends discover that several objects have been effect by Brickfication and their core bricks are unable to change them back. Meeting together at school they discuss what has happened. Toxsa sees a flower being brickified and touches it being affected himself. The boys hide Toxsa until they can find a way to reverse the process but this becomes difficult when Toxsa's older sister comes looking for him.
50	"Tower of Bricks" / "The End of the World"; Transliteration: "Sekai no owari" (Japanese: 世界の終わり)	Yō Miura	Hiroshi Ōnogi	November 29, 2014	March 21, 2015
When Vilius corrupts the good Tenkai Dragon, the evil Tenkai energies spiral out of control, resulting in dire consequences for Earth and Quarton. A device is built in Benham City to allay the Brickification phenomenon on Earth that the rampaging evil Tenkai energies are bringing about, but Vilius has sent Granox and Slyger to destroy it.
51	"Lone Wolf" / "And So, It Begins"; Transliteration: "Soshite, hajimari" (Japanese: そして、始まり)	Daigo Yamagishi	Hiroshi Ōnogi	December 6, 2014	March 28, 2015
With the Tenkai Wolf awakened, Bravenwolf gains a new power and destroys the two Tenkai Dragons with ease giving the others the ability to transform into Titan Mode again. However, this doesn't concern Vilius as he forces a Mega Fusion with the Corrupted Guardians against their will to become Vilius Ultra Guardian Mega Fusion. Meanwhile, Beag heads to the human world to stop Granox and Slyger from destroying the Anti-Brickification device. Could this be the final battle, and if so, will the Tenkai Knights defeat the corrupted, and live to tell the tale?

== Tenkai Knights: Origins ==
Tenkai Knights: Origins is a web series that acts as a prequel to Tenkai Knights. Each webisode tells the story of how Vilius betrayed the Guardians and his fellow knights to become the evil leader of the Corrupted Army. The web series has not been released in Japan.

No.	Title	Release date (on YouTube)
1	"Tenkai Five"	September 17, 2013
Learn the story of how Vilius betrayed the Guardians and his fellow knights to become the evil leader of the Corrupted Army.
2	"Off Balance"	September 24, 2013
The origin of Vilius and his Corrupted Army continues! The Guardians' mastery of Tenkai energy is revealed and Vilius learns some dangerous new tricks.
3	"The Best"	October 1, 2013
The origins of Vilius continues! See the story of how Vilius became a warlord.
4	"Corrupted!"	October 8, 2013
Vilius' lust for Tenkai Energy reaches the tipping point and consumes him! Dismissed by the Guardians.
5	"Shifting the Griffin"	October 15, 2013
Vilius has unleashed a horde of Corrupted Troopers!
6	"BlasTank Corruption!"	October 22, 2013
Vilius keeps shapeshifting the Corekai's equipment into wicked alternate configurations!
7	"Guardian's Danger"	November 5, 2013
The Knights are holding back the Corrupted Army's attack... for now.
8	"Clash of the Tenkai!"	November 12, 2013
The Knights reach the Guardians' chambers just in time to face Vilius, but is his power now too much for the Knights to handle?
9	"Titan Revealed"	December 3, 2013
The Knights have almost gotten Guardian Boreas to safety, but Vilius is not about to stop now… watch as he shapeshifts into his most powerful form yet!
10	"Tenkai United"	December 10, 2013
The Dimensional Dropship arrives to rescue Boreas, but Vilius' power seems unstoppable! Are the Knights only delaying the inevitable?
