= Love Approach =

Studio album by Tom Browne
- Released: 1980
- Recorded: 1979–1980
- Studio: A & R Studios (New York City, New York)
- Genre: Jazz, jazz-funk
- Length: 36:32
- Label: GRP
- Producer: Dave Grusin Larry Rosen

Tom Browne chronology
Browne Sugar (1979)	Love Approach (1980)	Magic (1981)

Professional ratings
Review scores
Source	Rating
Allmusic	3/5 stars

Love Approach is an album by American trumpeter Tom Browne that was released by GRP Records in 1980. The song "Funkin' for Jamaica (N.Y.)" topped the U.S. R&B chart for three weeks in October 1980.

== Track listing ==
All tracks composed by Tom Browne, except where indicated

1. "Funkin' for Jamaica (N.Y.)" (Browne, Toni Smith) – 4:43
2. "Her Silent Smile" – 5:12
3. "Forever More" (Don Blackman) – 3:22
4. "Dreams of Lovin' You" (Omar Hakim) – 4:20
5. "Nocturne" – 5:08
6. "Martha" (Browne, Smith) – 3:41
7. "Moon Rise" (Lesette Wilson) – 5:15
8. "Weak in the Knees" (featuring Viki Sylva) (Sylva) – 4:41

== Personnel ==
- Tom Browne – trumpet (1–6, 8), arrangements (1, 2, 4–6), Prophet Polyphonic synthesizer programming, Prophet-5 (2), flugelhorn (4, 7), synthesizers (6)
- Ed Walsh – Oberheim Polyphonic synthesizer programming
- Dave Grusin – acoustic piano (1), Oberheim Polyphonic synthesizer (3, 4), electric piano (4, 5, 8), arrangements (4, 5, 7, 8), Prophet Polyphonic synthesizer (5), Moog synthesizer (6–8)
- Bernard Wright – electric piano (1, 2), Prophet Polyphonic synthesizer (1), acoustic piano (6)
- Lesette Wilson – acoustic piano (2), Prophet Polyphonic synthesizer (2, 3, 5, 6), electric piano (3, 6, 7)
- Jorge Dalto – acoustic piano (5)
- Bobby Broom – guitars (1–7)
- Michael Viñas – acoustic guitar (8)
- Marcus Miller – bass (1, 2, 5, 7, 8)
- Sekou Bunch – bass (3)
- Francisco Centeño – bass (4, 6)
- Buddy Williams – drums (1, 5–8)
- Omar Hakim – drums (2–4)
- Errol "Crusher" Bennett – percussion (1, 3)
- Larry Rosen – percussion (2)
- Carol Steele – percussion (2, 4, 6–8)
- Bob Franceschini – tenor saxophone (4, 5)
- Barbara Bellins – flute (5)
- Weldon Irvine – arrangements (3)
- Toni Smith – vocals (1, 6)
- Victoria Sylva – vocals (8)

Handclaps (Tracks 1 & 3)

- Tom Browne, Alvin Flythe, Mike Flythe, Bob Franceschini, Omar Hakim, Kevin Osborne, Martha Rojas, Toni Smith and Victoria Sylva

Rap on "Funkin' for Jamaica"

- Alvin Flythe, Mike Flythe and Kevin Osborne

== Production ==
- Dave Grusin – producer
- Larry Rosen – producer, recording, digital mixing
- Ollie Cotton – additional recording, recording assistant, mix assistant
- Richard Feldman – engineer at Digital Equipment Soundstream (Salt Lake City, Utah)
- Ted Jensen – mastering at Sterling Sound (New York, NY)
- Peter Lopez – GRP production coordinator
- Donn Davenport – art direction
- Lisa Wolf – design
- John Ford – photography
- Gerard Huerta – logo design
- Jeri Haywood – hair, make-up
- Lisa Daurio – stylist
- Jimmy Boyd – management

== Charts ==
Year	Album	Chart positions		
Year	Album	US	US R&B	US Jazz
1980	Love Approach	18	1	1

=== Singles ===
Year	Single	Chart positions	
Year	Single	US R&B	US Dance
1980	"Funkin' for Jamaica (N.Y.)"	1	9

== Culture ==
The instrumental track "Forever More" was heard as part of the beginning and end of the broadcast day on the NBC affiliate in Columbus, Ohio, WCMH-TV in the mid-1980s.
