= Havana (film) =

1990 film by Sydney Pollack

- Theatrical release poster
- Directed by: Sydney Pollack
- Screenplay by: Judith Rascoe; David Rayfiel
- Story by: Judith Rascoe
- Produced by: Sydney Pollack; Richard Roth; Ronald L. Schwary
- Starring: Robert Redford; Lena Olin; Alan Arkin
- Cinematography: Owen Roizman
- Edited by: Fredric Steinkamp; William Steinkamp
- Music by: Dave Grusin
- Production companies: Universal Pictures; Mirage Enterprises; Grimes Production
- Distributed by: Universal Pictures
- Release date: December 12, 1990
- Running time: 144 minutes
- Country: United States
- Language: English
- Budget: $40 million
- Box office: $36 million

Havana is a 1990 American drama film starring Robert Redford, Lena Olin, and Alan Arkin, directed by Sydney Pollack with music by Dave Grusin. The film's plot concerns Jack Weil (Redford), an American professional gambler who decides to visit Havana, Cuba in 1958 on the eve of the Cuban Revolution.

Most reviews were not positive, and the film suffered the first major box office deficit of Redford's career.

== Plot ==
It is the eve of the Cuban Revolution's culmination. On Christmas Eve, 1958, aboard the boat from Miami to Havana, Roberta Duran enlists the aid of professional poker player Jack Weil in smuggling radios for the revolutionaries in the hills. Weil agrees only because he is romantically interested in her. When they rendezvous for the "payoff," Roberta reveals that she is married, dashing Weil's hopes. In Havana, Weil meets a Cuban journalist acquaintance and during a night on the town, they run into Roberta and her husband, Dr. Arturo Duran, a revolutionary leader. Duran asks Weil for further aid for the cause. Weil turns him down.

After a night of debauchery, Weil reads a newspaper account of Duran's arrest and death. In shock, he continues with the planned poker game, coincidentally meeting the head of the secret police. He learns that Roberta was also arrested and tortured in custody. He pressures another player in debt to him to obtain her release. Shaken by her husband's death and her own experience in jail, she lets him shelter her in his apartment, but disappears that afternoon.

Realizing that he is in love with Roberta and encouraged by an old gambling friend, Weil drives into Cuba's interior to find her at Duran's old estate. He persuades her to return with him to Havana and to leave Cuba with him. When she asks, he explains that a lump on his arm contains a diamond that he had put there in his youth as insurance. He makes arrangements for her to leave Cuba via boat, but on his return to the apartment, he is assaulted by two Cubans, who inform him that Duran demands he get Roberta out of the country. Weil has a CIA acquaintance, Marion Chigwell, who confirms that Duran is still alive. He intimidates Chigwell into working with him to free Duran.

Pretending to work for the CIA, Weil goes to see Duran, who is being held by the chief of the secret police. He tells the chief that Washington has plans for Duran and wants him released, with a payoff of $50,000. Weil goes to a doctor and then a jeweler to sell the diamond to raise the bribe for Duran's release. He tells Roberta, who had decided to make a life with him, that her husband is alive. In shock, she leaves on her own to find her husband. Meanwhile, Weil blows the big game with high rollers, for whom he had been angling since he arrived in Havana. The casino's manager, Joe Volpi, forgives him, knowing he has made rescuing Roberta his priority.

On New Year's Eve, 1959, the revolutionaries have won. The upper class, government officials, and the secret police all make a mad dash to leave the country. The people pour into the streets, celebrating the victory by trashing the casinos and dancing. Weil and Volpi agree that it is time for them to leave. The next morning, Weil is in a restaurant preparing to depart. He sees Chigwell, who informs him that he is working on a new book, The Cuisine of Indochina. Roberta shows up to bid him farewell. She sees the bandage on his arm and discovers what it cost him to save her husband for her. She remains with the revolution, and he has been changed by it.

Four years later in 1963, Jack drives down to the Florida Keys and gazes across the sea toward Havana, hoping to see a boat bringing Roberta. He knows the ferry is no longer running. However, he does this every year in the hope he might someday see Roberta again. He also realizes that the changes in Cuba are being echoed in the United States.

== Cast ==
- Robert Redford as Jack Weil, a professional gambler, Jack used to be in the U.S. Navy and served in World War II's Pacific Theater, stating that he was at Pearl Harbor when it was bombed.
- Lena Olin as Bobby Durán. Swedish by birth, Bobby moved to California to become an actress then went to Mexico when her first husband got blacklisted. When she came to Havana, she soon married Arturo Duran.
- Alan Arkin as Joe Volpi. The manager of a popular Havana casino, Joe works for mobster Meyer Lansky. Joe is an old friend of Jack's.
- Tomás Milián as Menocal. A colonel in the secret police, Menocal answers to Batista and tries to keep Havana under control through abduction and murder. Menocal is against the revolution because he believes no matter who is in charge someone always will suffer.
- Daniel Davis as Marion Chigwell. A writer for Gourmet magazine, Marion is frequently seen around Havana trying food at restaurants.
- Tony Plana as Julio Ramos. A friend of Jack and a reporter, Julio is sympathetic to the revolution.
- Betsy Brantley as Diane, an American tourist who meets Jack at a bar
- Lise Cutter as Patty, Diane's friend
- Richard Farnsworth as The Professor, an old gambler who gives Jack relationship advice
- Mark Rydell as Meyer Lansky, the infamous Jewish mobster. He is the head of Mafia operations in Havana, owning many of Havana's casinos.
- Vasek Simek as Willy
- Fred Asparagus as "Baby" Hernández
- Richard Portnow as Mike MacClaney
- Dion Anderson as Roy Forbes
- Carmine Caridi as Captain Potts
- Raul Julia (uncredited) as Arturo Durán. A member of an old, wealthy family, Arturo is a figurehead in the revolution but must keep his activities to a minimum in Havana.

== Production ==
Re-created El Prado as seen in the film

The film's Havana street under construction before production

Filming began on November 22, 1989, and was completed on April 28, 1990. Sydney Pollack hoped to film in Havana. However, U.S. law would not allow producers to spend any U.S. dollars in Cuba; U.S. citizens could not legally enter Cuba; and relations between the U.S. and Cuba in 1989 were not conducive to filming an American motion picture in Havana. Thus, it was decided to make the entire film in the Dominican Republic. The vegetation was the same, and Santo Domingo offered certain architectural similarities, though not a wide boulevard like Havana's famous El Prado (Paseo de Marti). The end scene was filmed in Key West, Florida.

Tomás Milián, who played the Batista's head of secret police, had lived in Cuba during the 1950s and commented that the film recreated Havana during the Batista regime's last days in great detail. Many of the extras were exiled Cubans who had moved to the Dominican Republic. According to Sydney Pollack, "The atmosphere became quite emotional... They remembered the old days in Havana. Our set took them back 30 years."

The film's main set, informally called "The Big Set", was a quarter-mile-long (400 m) street surrounded by façades representing casinos, restaurants, and hotels. Interior scenes were shot on replicated casino floors, hotel rooms, and cafes. The Prado was reconstructed at a former airbase in the Dominican Republic. To replicate it, a team of about 300 tradesmen was assembled, and over 80 neon signs were made in the U.S. and shipped to the Dominican Republic. The set took 20 weeks to construct. Costume designer Bernie Pollock had to outfit 2,000 extras and needed 8,000–10,000 costumes for frequent changes across the film's scenes. Besides 1950s period clothing, there were large numbers of hats, accessories, jewelry, and gloves, along with 1950s Cuban military uniforms. The wardrobe items were brought in from both L.A. and England. About 100 1950s-vintage American automobiles, buses, and trucks appear in the film.

The version of "Rum and Coca-Cola" by The Andrews Sisters is a re-recorded version from 1961 from their DOT Records album Greatest Hits, which was recorded two years after the film's setting.

Raul Julia chose to remain uncredited because the film's producers would not give him above-the-title credit alongside Robert Redford and Lena Olin.

== Reception ==
The reviews were generally negative. The film has a 28% rating on Rotten Tomatoes based on 25 reviews with the consensus: "Handsomely produced and dramatically inert, Havana squanders its convincing recreation of pre-revolution Cuba by using it as a disconnected backdrop to a turgid romance." Audiences polled by CinemaScore gave the film an average grade of "C+" on an A+ to F scale.

On a budget of $40 million, Havana made only $9 million in the United States and Canada but grossed $27 million overseas for a worldwide total of $36 million.

The musical score received Golden Globe, Oscar, and Grammy nominations. It was one of Dave Grusin's more acclaimed scores.

== See also ==
- Havana (soundtrack)
- Cuba (1979 film)
