= Funkin' for Jamaica (N.Y.) =

- Side A of the US 7-inch single

Single by Tom Browne

from the album Love Approach
- B-side: "Her Silent Smile"
- Released: July 1980
- Genre: Jazz-funk
- Length: 3:44 (single version); 4:43 (album version)
- Label: GRP/Arista
- Songwriter(s): Tom Browne, Toni Smith (Thomassina Carrollyne Smith)
- Producer(s): Dave Grusin, Larry Rosen

Music video
- "Funkin' for Jamaica (N.Y.)" (single edit) by Tom Browne on YouTube

"Funkin' for Jamaica (N.Y.)" is a song by jazz trumpeter Tom Browne. The single—a memoir of the Jamaica neighborhood in the New York City borough of Queens where Browne was born and raised—is from his second solo album, Love Approach. Browne got the idea for the song while he was at his parents' home. The vocals for the single were performed by Toni Smith (Thomassina Carrollyne Smith), who also helped compose the song. The song hit number one on the US Billboard R&B chart for a month. "Funkin' for Jamaica" peaked at number nine on the dance chart and made the top 10 on the UK Singles Chart, but it never charted on the Billboard Hot 100.

== Personnel ==
- Tom Browne – trumpet, handclaps
- Dave Grusin – acoustic piano
- Bernard Wright – electric piano, Prophet Polyphonic synthesizer
- Bobby Broom – guitar
- Marcus Miller – bass
- Buddy Williams – drums
- Errol "Crusher" Bennett – percussion
- Omar Hakim – handclaps
- Martha Rojas – handclaps
- Victoria Sylva – handclaps
- Alvin Flythe – rap, handclaps
- Mike Flythe – rap, handclaps
- Kevin Osborne – rap, handclaps
- Toni Smith – vocals, handclaps

== Charts ==
=== Weekly charts ===
| Chart (1980–81) | Peak position |
|---|---|
| Belgium (Ultratop 50 Flanders) | 6 |
| Netherlands (Dutch Top 40) | 3 |
| Netherlands (Single Top 100) | 6 |
| New Zealand (Recorded Music NZ) | 30 |
| UK Singles (OCC) | 10 |
| US Hot Dance Club Songs (Billboard) | 9 |
| US R&B (Billboard) | 1 |

| Chart (1992) (1991 Remix) | Peak position |
|---|---|
| Europe (European Dance Radio) | 14 |
| Netherlands (Dutch Top 40) | 38 |
| Netherlands (Single Top 100) | 40 |
| UK Singles (OCC) | 45 |

=== Year-end charts ===
| Chart (1981) | Position |
|---|---|
| Belgium (Ultratop Flanders) | 66 |
| Netherlands (Dutch Top 40) | 31 |
| Netherlands (Single Top 100) | 57 |

== Covers and samples ==
- The 1981 UK funk/disco novelty "The Wikka Rap" by The Evasions featured heavy sampling of "Funkin' for Jamaica'", from which in turn a vocal sample was included on Coolio's song "1, 2, 3, 4 (Sumpin' New)".
- In 1989, American rapper Tone Loc sampled "Funkin' for Jamaica" for his song "I Got It Goin' On" on his debut album Lōc-ed After Dark.
- In 1996, The song was sampled by Quad City DJ's for their song, "Quad City Funk" on the album Get On Up and Dance.
- DJ Tōwa Tei released his remix cover version as a single in both 1999 and 2001, which featured Les Nubians on vocals, performing part of the song in French.
- In 2000, the song was featured on the Bob Baldwin album BobBaldwin.com with Tom Browne performing.
- In 2001, the song's intro was sampled on the Mariah Carey single "Don't Stop (Funkin' 4 Jamaica)" for the soundtrack to Carey's film Glitter. The song has also been sampled by The Evasions, N.W.A, EPMD, Snoop Dogg, Keith Murray, Smooth, Erykah Badu, Shaquille O' Neal, and The Black Eyed Peas.
- In 2006, contemporary jazz guitarist Patrick Yandall covered the song on his album Samoa Soul.
- In 2007, the song was interpolated by The Clark Sisters for their song "Livin'" on their live album, Live – One Last Time, written by Donald Lawrence and Loren McGee.
