= Tom Browne (trumpeter) =

American jazz trumpeter

- Born: October 30, 1954 (age 71); Queens, New York
- Genres: Funk, jazz, R&B
- Occupation: Musician
- Instrument: Trumpet
- Years active: 1979–present
- Labels: GRP, Arista

Tom Browne (born October 30, 1954) is an American jazz trumpeter. He rose to prominence with Sonny Fortune and had major hits in 1980 and 1981: the No. 1 Billboard magazine R&B single "Funkin' for Jamaica (N.Y.)" and the No. 4 R&B single "Thighs High (Grip Your Hips and Move)".

== Discography ==
=== Studio albums ===
Year	Album	Peak chart positions			Label
Year	Album	US 200	US Jazz	US R&B	Label
1979	Browne Sugar	147	6	50	Arista/GRP
1980	Love Approach	18	1	1	Arista/GRP
1981	Yours Truly	97	6	20	Arista/GRP
1981	Magic	37	2	5	Arista/GRP
1982	Special Edition with Sid McCoy	—	—	—	Westwood One
1983	Rockin' Radio	147	—	24	Arista
1984	Tommy Gun	—	22	49	Arista
1988	No Longer I	—	—	—	Malaco
1994	Mo' Jamaica Funk	—	—	—	Hip Bop
1996	Another Shade of Browne	—	—	—	Hip Bop
1999	R 'n' Browne	—	—	—	Hip Bop
2010	S' Up	—	—	—	Cheetah
"—" denotes releases that did not chart.

=== Singles ===
Year	Title	Peak chart positions					
Year	Title	US Dance	US R&B	BEL (FL)	NL	NZ	UK
1980	"Funkin' for Jamaica (N.Y.)"	9	1	6	6	30	10
1980	"Thighs High (Grip Your Hips and Move)"	25	4	—	—	—	45
1981	"Let's Dance"	—	59	—	—	—	—
1981	"Fungi Mama"	29	23	—	—	—	58
1982	"Bye Gones"	—	72	—	—	—	—
1983	"Rockin' Radio"	33	11	—	—	—	76
1984	"Cruisin'"	24	63	—	—	—	—
1984	"Secret Fantasy"	—	36	—	—	—	—
1992	"Funkin' for Jamaica" (remix)	—	—	—	40	—	45
"—" denotes releases that did not chart.
