= Dave Grusin =

American composer, arranger, producer, and pianist

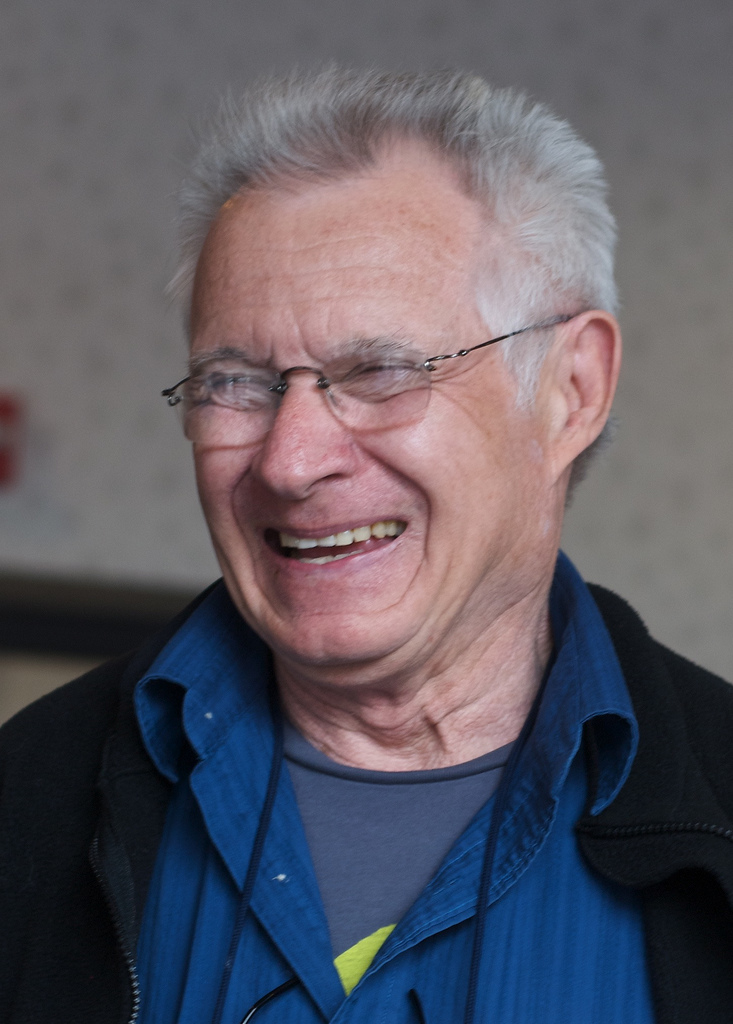
- Grusin in 2008
- Born: Robert David Grusin; June 26, 1934 (age 92); Littleton, Colorado, U.S.
- Spouse: Nan Newton
- Children: Three
- Relatives: Don Grusin
- Musical career
- Genres: Jazz; jazz fusion; contemporary jazz
- Occupations: Musician; composer; producer
- Instruments: Piano; keyboards
- Years active: 1962–present
- Label: GRP

Robert David Grusin (born June 26, (Note: Some sources give Grusin's date of birth as June 24, although most agree on June 26.) 1934) is an American composer, arranger, producer, jazz pianist, and band leader. He has composed many scores for feature films and television, and has won numerous awards for his soundtrack and record work, including an Academy Award and 10 Grammy Awards. Grusin was also a frequent collaborator with director Sydney Pollack, scoring many of his films like Three Days of the Condor (1975), Absence of Malice (1981), Tootsie (1982), The Firm (1993), and Random Hearts (1999). In 1978, Grusin founded GRP Records with Larry Rosen, and was an early pioneer of digital recording.

== Early life ==
Robert David Grusin was born on June 26, 1934, in Littleton, Colorado, to Henri and Rosabelle (née de Poyster) Grusin. His family originates from the Gruzinsky princely line of the Bagrationi dynasty, the royal family that ruled the Kingdom of Georgia in the ninth to 19th centuries. In Slavic languages, "Grusin" is an ethnonym for Georgians. Grusin's father, Henri, was a violinist of Jewish ancestry who was born and raised in Riga, Latvia, then part of the Russian Empire, from where he emigrated to the United States in 1913. Grusin's mother, Rosabelle, was a pianist. He is the older brother of fellow jazz keyboardist, composer, and producer Don Grusin.

Grusin studied music at the University of Colorado at Boulder and graduated in 1956. His teachers included Cecil Effinger, and Wayne Scott, a jazz pianist, arranger, and professor.

== Career ==
Grusin produced his first single in 1962, "Subways Are for Sleeping", and his first film score, for Divorce American Style, five years later. Other scores followed, including The Graduate (1967), A Man Called Gannon (1969) (he also sang the opening theme song, A Smile, a Mem'ry and an Extra Shirt), Winning (1969), The Friends of Eddie Coyle (1973), The Midnight Man (1974), and Three Days of the Condor (1975).

In 1978, Grusin founded GRP Records with his business partner Larry Rosen, and began producing some of the first commercial digital recordings. Grusin was the composer for On Golden Pond (1981), Tootsie (1982), and The Goonies (1985). In 1988, he won the Oscar for Best Original Score for The Milagro Beanfield War. Grusin composed the musical signatures for the 1984 TriStar Pictures logo (which was credited at the end of Look Who's Talking Too) and the 1993 Columbia Pictures Television logo.

In 1998, Grusin ranked #5 and #8 on Billboard's Top 10 Jazz Artists, at mid-year and at year's end, respectively, based on sales of his album "Dave Grusin Presents West Side Story."

From 2000 to 2011, Grusin concentrated on classical and jazz compositions, touring and recording with collaborators including jazz singer and lyricist Lorraine Feather and guitarist Lee Ritenour. Their album Harlequin won a Grammy Award in 1985. Their classical crossover albums, Two Worlds and Amparo, were nominated for Grammys.

Grusin has a filmography of about 100 titles. His many awards include an Oscar for best original score for The Milagro Beanfield War, as well as Oscar nominations for The Champ, The Fabulous Baker Boys, The Firm, Havana, Heaven Can Wait, and On Golden Pond. Grusin received a Best Original Song nomination for "It Might Be You" from the film Tootsie. Six of the 14 cuts on the soundtrack from The Graduate are his. Other film scores Grusin has composed include Where Were You When the Lights Went Out?, Three Days of the Condor, The Goonies, Tequila Sunrise, Hope Floats, Random Hearts, The Heart Is a Lonely Hunter, Mulholland Falls, and The Firm. He composed the original opening fanfare for film studio TriStar Pictures.

Grusin composed theme music for the TV programs Good Morning World (1967), It Takes a Thief (1968), The Name of the Game (1968), The Bold Ones (1969), Dan August (1970), The Sandy Duncan Show (1971–72), Maude (1972), Assignment Vienna, Good Times (1974), Baretta (1975), St. Elsewhere (1982), and, for Televisa in Mexico, Tres Generaciones (1987). He composed music for individual episodes of each of those shows. Grusin's other TV credits include The Wild Wild West (1966), The Girl from U.N.C.L.E. (1966), and Columbo: Prescription: Murder (1968). He composed and performed the 1984-1991 theme music for One Life to Live (1968). Grusin wrote the music for the This Is America, Charlie Brown episode "The Smithsonian and the Presidency", and two of the cues from the episode "History Lesson" and "Breadline Blues" (the latter covered by Kenny G) appear on the tribute album Happy Anniversary, Charlie Brown. "History Lesson" also appears in the Amiga CDTV version of Snoopy: The Cool Computer Game.

In 1994, GRP was in charge of MCA's jazz operations. Founders Grusin and Rosen left in the following year and were replaced by Tommy LiPuma. In 1997, Grusin and Rosen founded N2K Encoded Music, which was renamed N-Coded Music.

Grusin received honorary doctorates from Berklee College of Music in 1988 and University of Colorado, College of Music the following year. He was initiated into the Beta Chi chapter of Phi Mu Alpha Sinfonia at the University of Colorado in 1991.

== Personal life ==
Grusin has been married to Nan Newton, and they have three sons: Scott, Michael, and Stuart. He is also the stepfather of Nan's adult daughter, Annie Vought. Grusin is the subject of a 2018 feature-length documentary, Dave Grusin: Not Enough Time.

== Awards and honors ==
Over a 15-year period, from 1979 to 1994, Grusin won an Academy Award, and received seven more nominations. He has been nominated for 38 Grammy Awards and won 10.

=== Academy Awards ===
Dates given are those of the relevant Awards ceremony, not when the films were released.

- Winner, Music (Original Score): The Milagro Beanfield War (1989)
- Nomination, Music (Original Score): Heaven Can Wait (1979), The Champ (1980), On Golden Pond (1982), The Fabulous Baker Boys (1990), Havana (1991), The Firm (1994)
- Nomination, Music (Original Song): "It Might Be You" (1983), with Alan and Marilyn Bergman

=== Grammy Awards ===
- Winner, Best Original Score Written For A Motion Picture Or A Television Special: The Graduate (1968), shared with Paul Simon.
- Winner, Best Arrangement on an Instrumental: Summer Sketches '82 (1982), "Early A.M. Attitude" (1986), "Suite" for The Milagro Beanfield War (1990), "Bess You Is My Woman/I Loves You Porgy" (1991), "Mood Indigo" (1993), "Three Cowboy Songs" (1994)
- Winner, Best Instrumental Arrangement Accompanying Vocals: "My Funny Valentine" by Michelle Pfeiffer (1989), "Mean Old Man" by James Taylor (2002)
- Winner, Best Album Original Score Written for Motion Picture or Television: The Fabulous Baker Boys (1989)
- Nomination, Best Original Score: Selena

=== Golden Globe Awards ===
- Nomination, Best Original Score: The Milagro Beanfield War (1988), The Fabulous Baker Boys (1989), Havana (1990), For the Boys (1991)

=== Other ===
- Charles E. Lutton Man of Music Award, Phi Mu Alpha Sinfonia, 1991
- AFI's 100 Years of Film Scores (Best American Film Scores of all Time voted by the American Film Institute): #24 for On Golden Pond

== Discography ==
=== As leader ===
- Subways Are for Sleeping (Epic, 1962)
- Piano, Strings, and Moonlight (Epic, 1962)
- Kaleidoscope (Columbia, 1964)
- Divorce American Style (United Artists, 1967) – soundtrack
- The Graduate (Columbia, 1968) – soundtrack recorded in 1967
- The Heart is a Lonely Hunter (Film Score Monthly, 1968) - soundtrack
- The Ghost & Mrs. Muir (1968 - 1970) – TV series
- The Name of the Game (1968 - 1971) – TV series theme
- Candy (Epic, 1969) – soundtrack
- Three Days of the Condor (DRG/EMI, 1975) – soundtrack
- Discovered Again! (Sheffield Lab, 1976)
- Don't Touch (Versatile, 1977)
- One of a Kind (GRP, 1977)
- Heaven Can Wait (Kritzerland, 1978) - soundtrack
- The Champ (Varèse Sarabande, 1979) – soundtrack
- The Electric Horseman (Varèse Sarabande, 1979) – soundtrack
- Mountain Dance (GRP, 1980) - AUS #100
- Dave Grusin Presents GRP All-Stars Live in Japan (JVC, 1980)
- On Golden Pond (Varèse Sarabande, 1981) - soundtrack
- Out of the Shadows (Arista-GRP, 1982)
- Tootsie (Film Score Monthly, 1982) - soundtrack
- Night-Lines (GRP, 1983)
- Dave Grusin and the NY-LA Dream Band (GRP, 1984)
- Racing with the Moon (Kritzerland, 1984) - soundtrack
- The Pope of Greenwich Village (Quartet Records, 1984) - soundtrack
- Harlequin (with Lee Ritenour) (GRP, 1985)
- The Goonies (Varèse Sarabande, 1985) - soundtrack
- Lucas (Varèse Sarabande, 1986)
- Cinemagic (GRP, 1987)
- GRP Live in Session (GRP, 1988)
- Sticks and Stones (with Don Grusin) (GRP, 1988)
- Migration (GRP, 1989)
- The Fabulous Baker Boys (GRP, 1989) - soundtrack
- A Dry White Season (Kritzerland, 1989) - soundtrack
- The Bonfire of the Vanities (Atlantic, 1990) - soundtrack
- Havana (GRP, 1990) - soundtrack
- The Gershwin Connection (GRP, 1991)
- GRP Super Live in Concert (GRP, 1992)
- Homage to Duke (GRP <GRD-9715>, 1993)
- The Firm (MCA-GRP <MGD-2007>, 1993) - soundtrack
- Dave Grusin Presents GRP All-Star Big Band Live! (GRP 97402, 1993)
- The Orchestral Album (GRP, 1994)
- The Cure (GRP, 1995) - soundtrack
- Two for the Road (GRP, 1996)
- Mulholland Falls (Cinerama, 1996) - soundtrack
- Selena (Angel, 1997) - soundtrack
- West Side Story (N-Coded, 1997)
- Hope Floats (RCA Victor, 1998) - soundtrack
- Random Hearts (Sony, 1999)
- Two Worlds (with Lee Ritenour) (Decca, 2000)
- Dinner with Friends (Jellybean, 2001) - soundtrack
- Portrait of Bill Evans (JVC, 2002) [2 tracks]
- Now Playing (GRP, 2004)
- Amparo (with Lee Ritenour) (Decca, 2008)
- The Girl from U.N.C.L.E. (Varèse Sarabande, 2008) - soundtrack
- An Evening with Dave Grusin (Heads Up, 2010)
- One Night Only! (C.A.R.E./Intergroove, 2011)
- Brasil (Candid, 2024)

=== As sideman ===
With Patti Austin

- Havana Candy (CTI, 1977)
- Love Is Gonna Getcha (GRP, 1990) – rec. 1989

With the Brothers Johnson

- Look Out for#1 (A&M, 1976)
- Right on Time (A&M, 1977)

With Tom Browne

- Browne Sugar (GRP, 1979)
- Love Approach (GRP, 1980) – rec. 1979-80
- Magic (Arista, 1981)

With Don Grusin

- 10k-LA (JVC, 1981)
- Native Land (GRP, 1993)
- The Hang (Sovereign, 2004)

With Quincy Jones

- You've Got It Bad Girl (A&M, 1973)
- Body Heat (A&M, 1974)
- Mellow Madness (A&M, 1975)
- I Heard That!! (A&M, 1976)
- Roots (A&M, 1977)

With John Klemmer

- Touch (ABC, 1975)
- Barefoot Ballet (ABC, 1976)

With Earl Klugh

- Earl Klugh (Blue Note, 1976)
- Living Inside Your Love (Blue Note, 1976)
- Finger Paintings (Blue Note, 1977)

With Jon Lucien

- Rashida (RCA, 1973)
- Mind's Eye (RCA, 1974)
- Song for My Lady (Columbia, 1975)

With Harvey Mason

- Marching in the Street (Arista, 1976)
- Funk in a Mason Jar (Arista, 1977)
- With All My Heart (Bluebird, 2004)

With Carmen McRae

- I Am Music (Blue Note, 1975)
- Can't Hide Love (Blue Note, 1976)

With Sergio Mendes

- Homecooking (Elektra, 1976)
- Sergio Mendes & the New Brasil '77 (Elektra, 1977)

With Gerry Mulligan

- Little Big Horn (GRP, 1983)
- Dragonfly (Telarc Jazz, 1995)

With Lee Ritenour

- First Course (Epic, 1976)
- Gentle Thoughts(JVC 1977)
- Captain Fingers (Epic, 1977)
- Friendship (Jasrac, 1978)
- The Captain's Journey (Elektra, 1978)
- Rio (JVC, 1979)
- Feel the Night (Discovery, 1979)
- On the Line (GRP, 1983)
- "Harlequin" (GRP, 1985)
- Earth Run (GRP, 1986)
- Festival (GRP, 1988)
- World of Brazil (GRP, 2003)
- Overtime (Peak, 2005)
- Smoke 'N' Mirrors (Peak, 2006)
- Rhythm Sessions (Concord, 2012)
- A Twist of Rit (Concord, 2015)

With Diane Schuur

- Deedles (1985)
- Timeless (1986)

With James Taylor

- October Road (Columbia, 2002)
- A Christmas Album (Hallmark Cards, 2004)
- James Taylor at Christmas (Columbia, 2006)

With Dave Valentin

- Legends (Arista GRP, 1978)
- The Hawk (GRP, 1979)
- Flute Juice (GRP, 1983)
- Kalahari (GRP, 1984)

With Sarah Vaughan

- A Time in My Life (Mainstream, 1972)
- Sarah Vaughan with Michel Legrand (Mainstream, 1972)

With Sadao Watanabe

- My Dear Life (Flying Disk, 1977)
- California Shower (Flying Disk, 1978)
- Morning Island (Flying Disk, 1979)
- How's Everything (Columbia, 1980)[2LP] – live
- Orange Express (CBS/Sony, 1981)
- Encore! (Victor, 2016)

With others

- George Benson, 20/20 (Warner Bros., 1985) – rec. 1984
- Angela Bofill, Angel of the Night (Arista, 1979)
- Ray Brown, Brown's Bag (Concord Jazz, 1976)
- Bobby Broom, Clean Sweep (Arista GRP, 1981)
- Judy Collins, Home Again (Elektra, 1984)
- Eddie Daniels, Blackwood (GRP, 1989)
- Kevin Eubanks, Face to Face (GRP, 1986)
- Art Farmer, Crawl Space (CTI, 1972)
- Eric Gale, Part of You (Columbia, 1979)
- Gordon Goodwin's Big Phat Band, Act Your Age (Immergent, 2008)
- Lesley Gore, Love Me by Name (A&M, 1976)
- Jay Hoggard, Days Like These (GRP, 1979)
- Al Jarreau, We Got By (Reprise, 1975)
- Billy Joel, 52nd Street (Columbia, 1978)
- Chaka Khan, ck (Warner Bros., 1988)
- Peggy Lee, Let's Love (Atlantic, 1974)
- Bette Midler, For the Boys (Atlantic, 1991) – soundtrack
- Melba Moore, Peach Melba (Buddah, 1975)
- Alphonse Mouzon, The Man Incognito (Blue Note, 1976) – rec. 1975
- Noel Pointer, Phantazia (Blue Note, 1977)
- The Rippingtons, Curves Ahead (GRP, 1991)
- Howard Roberts, Equinox Express Elevator (Impulse!, 1972)
- Phoebe Snow, Against the Grain (CBS, 1978)
- Donna Summer, Donna Summer (Geffen, 1982) – rec. 1981–82
- Grover Washington Jr., A Secret Place (Kudu, 1976)
- Nancy Wilson, This Mother's Daughter (Capitol, 1976)
- Bill Withers, Making Music (Columbia, 1975)

== Filmography ==
Year	Title	Director(s)	Studio(s)	Notes
1967	Divorce American Style	Bud Yorkin	Columbia Pictures	
1967	Waterhole No. 3	William A. Graham	Paramount Pictures	
1967	The Graduate	Mike Nichols	Embassy Pictures	
1967	The Scorpio Letters	Richard Thorpe	Metro-Goldwyn-Mayer	
1968	A Man Called Gannon	James Goldstone	Universal Pictures	
1968	Where Were You When the Lights Went Out?	Hy Averback	United Artists	
1968	The Heart Is a Lonely Hunter	Robert Ellis Miller	Warner Bros.	
1968	Candy	Christian Marquand	ABC Pictures	
1969	Winning	James Goldstone	Universal Pictures	
1969	Tell Them Willie Boy Is Here	Abraham Polonsky	Universal Pictures	
1970	Halls of Anger	Paul Bogart	United Artists	
1970	Adam at 6 A.M.	Robert Scheerer	Cinema Center Films	
1971	The Pursuit of Happiness	Robert Mulligan	Columbia Pictures	
1971	Shoot Out	Henry Hathaway	Universal Pictures	
1971	A Howling in the Woods	Daniel Petrie	NBC; Universal Television	Television film
1971	The Gang That Couldn't Shoot Straight	James Goldstone	Metro-Goldwyn-Mayer	
1972	The Great Northfield Minnesota Raid	Philip Kaufman	Universal Pictures	
1972	Fuzz	Richard A. Colla	United Artists	
1973	Amanda Fallon	Jack Laird	NBC; Universal Television	Television film
1973	The Friends of Eddie Coyle	Peter Yates	Paramount Pictures	
1974	The Death Squad	Harry Falk	ABC; Spelling-Goldberg Productions	Television film
1974	The Nickel Ride	Robert Mulligan	20th Century Fox	
1974	The Midnight Man	Roland Kibbee; Burt Lancaster	Universal Pictures	
1974	The Yakuza	Sydney Pollack	Warner Bros.	
1975	W.W. and the Dixie Dancekings	John G. Avildsen	20th Century Fox	
1975	Three Days of the Condor	Sydney Pollack	Paramount Pictures	
1976	Murder by Death	Robert Moore	Columbia Pictures	
1976	The Front	Martin Ritt	Columbia Pictures	
1977	Mr. Billion	Jonathan Kaplan	20th Century Fox	
1977	Fire Sale	Alan Arkin	20th Century Fox	
1977	The Goodbye Girl	Herbert Ross	Warner Bros.	
1977	Bobby Deerfield	Sydney Pollack	Warner Bros.	
1978	Heaven Can Wait	Warren Beatty; Buck Henry	Paramount Pictures	Nominated for Academy Award for Best Original Score
1979	The Champ	Franco Zeffirelli	Metro-Goldwyn-Mayer	Nominated for Academy Award for Best Original Score
1979	...And Justice for All.	Norman Jewison	Columbia Pictures	
1979	The Electric Horseman	Sydney Pollack	Columbia Pictures	
1980	My Bodyguard	Tony Bill	20th Century Fox	
1981	On Golden Pond	Mark Rydell	Associated Film Distribution	Nominated for Academy Award for Best Original Score
1981	Reds	Warren Beatty	Paramount Pictures	
1981	Absence of Malice	Sydney Pollack	Columbia Pictures	
1982	Author! Author!	Arthur Hiller	20th Century Fox	
1982	Tootsie	Sydney Pollack	Columbia Pictures	
1984	Racing with the Moon	Richard Benjamin	Paramount Pictures	
1984	The Little Drummer Girl	George Roy Hill	Warner Bros.	
1984	Falling in Love	Ulu Grosbard	Paramount Pictures	
1984	The Pope of Greenwich Village	Stuart Rosenberg	United Artists	
1985	The Goonies	Richard Donner	Warner Bros.	
1986	Lucas	David Seltzer	20th Century Fox	
1987	Ishtar	Elaine May	Columbia Pictures	With Bahjawa and Paul Williams
1988	The Milagro Beanfield War	Robert Redford	Universal Pictures	Winner of the Academy Award for Best Original Score
1988	Clara's Heart	Robert Mulligan	Warner Bros.	
1988	Tequila Sunrise	Robert Towne	Warner Bros.	
1989	A Dry White Season	Euzhan Palcy	Metro-Goldwyn-Mayer	
1989	The Fabulous Baker Boys	Steve Kloves	20th Century Fox	Nominated for Academy Award for Best Original Score
1990	Havana	Sydney Pollack	Universal Pictures	Nominated for Academy Award for Best Original Score
1990	The Bonfire of the Vanities	Brian De Palma	Warner Bros.	
1991	For the Boys	Mark Rydell	20th Century Fox	
1993	The Firm	Sydney Pollack	Paramount Pictures	Nominated for Academy Award for Best Original Score
1995	The Cure	Peter Horton	Universal Pictures	
1996	Mulholland Falls	Lee Tamahori	Metro-Goldwyn-Mayer	
1997	Selena	Gregory Nava	Warner Bros.	
1997	In the Gloaming	Christopher Reeve	HBO	Television film
1998	Hope Floats	Forest Whitaker	20th Century Fox	
1999	Random Hearts	Sydney Pollack	Columbia Pictures	
2001	Dinner with Friends	Norman Jewison	HBO	Television film
2006	Even Money	Mark Rydell	Yari Film Group	
2008	Recount	Jay Roach	HBO	Television film
2010	Harmony	Stuart Sender; Julie Bergman Sender	NBC	Television film
2013	Skating to New York	Charles Minsky	Well Go USA Entertainment	
