= Two Worlds (Lee Ritenour and Dave Grusin album) =

Studio album by Lee Ritenour and Dave Grusin
- Released: September 12, 2000
- Recorded: 1999–2000
- Studios: Starlight Studio (Malibu, California); Capitol Studios (Hollywood, California); Avatar (New York City, New York)
- Genres: Jazz, classical
- Length: 53:57
- Label: Decca
- Producers: Lee Ritenour; Dave Grusin

Professional ratings
Review scores
Source	Rating
AllMusic	4/5 stars
Stereo & Video	4/5 stars

Two Worlds is a classical music album by jazz musicians Lee Ritenour and Dave Grusin. Guests include Renée Fleming, Gil Shaham, and Julian Lloyd Webber.

== Critical reception ==
AllMusic's Jonathan Widran concludes his review with, "Timeless yet contemporary, Two Worlds is beautiful reunion of these musical soul mates."

Hilarie Grey of JazzTimes begins her favorable review with, "perennial jazz all-stars Lee Ritenour and Dave Grusin reach new career highs with the classically oriented Two Worlds."

== Track listing ==
No.	Title	Writer(s)	Length
1.	"Concerto in A Minor for Four Keyboards and Strings, BWV 1065: Movement 1"	Johann Sebastian Bach	4:34
2.	"Bachianas Brasileiras No. 5: Aria (Cantilena)" (featuring Renée Fleming)	Heitor Villa-Lobos	5:06
3.	"Sonatina: Andante II"	F. Moreno Torroba	4:32
4.	"Elegia (A Henri)" (With Introduction & Epilogue from Liebeslie, Fritz Kreisler, featuring Gil Shaham and Ralph Morrison)	Dave Grusin	3:21
5.	"Suite Popular Espanola: No. 3 Cancion" (featuring Jim Walker)	M. de Falla	3:59
6.	"Lagrima"	Lee Ritenour	4:20
7.	"River Songs: The Water Is Wide/Shenandoah" (featuring Renée Fleming)	Traditional	7:01
8.	"Romanian Folk Dances: Stick Dance, Sash Dance, Stamping Dance, Horn Dance, Romanian Polka, Fast Dance" (featuring Gil Shaham)	Béla Bartók	6:46
9.	"Suite Compostelana: III, Cuna"	Federico Mompou	4:26
10.	"Suite Popular Espanola: No. 1 El Pano Moruno" (featuring Jim Walker)	M. de Falla	3:18
11.	"Siciliana" (featuring Julian Lloyd Webber)	Johann Sebastian Bach	2:13
12.	"Canto Invierno"	Dave Grusin	4:00
Total length:			53:36

Japan, UK, Australia & European release
No.	Title	Writer(s)	Length
13.	"Bachianas Brasileiras No. 4 Preludio" (featuring Julian Lloyd Webber)	Heitor Villa-Lobos	4:10
Total length:			57:46

== Personnel ==
- Dave Grusin – grand piano, transcriptions (1–3, 8, 9, 11, 13), arrangements (5, 7, 10), string arrangements (6, 9)
- Lee Ritenour – classical guitar, transcriptions (3, 9)

Guest musicians and vocalists

- Renée Fleming – soprano vocals (2, 7)
- Luis Conte – percussion (3)
- Ralph Morrison – violin (4)
- Gil Shaham – violin (4, 8)
- Tom Kennedy – bass (5)
- Alex Acuña – drums (5), percussion (5)
- Jim Walker – flute (5, 10)
- Jorge Calandrelli – string arrangements (6, 9)
- Julian Lloyd Webber – cello (11, 13)

Strings

- Debbi Datz-Pyle and Patti Zimmitti – orchestra contractors
- Margaret Batjer and Ralph Morrison – concertmasters
- Vince Bartold, Lars Clutterham, Julia Eidsvoog, John Eidsvoog, Ron Gorow, Mark Graham, Jim Hoffman, Joann Kane, Deborah Mitchell, Larry Rench and Steven L. Smith – copyists
- Steven Erdody, Paula Hochhalter, Christina Soule and Cecilia Tsan – cello
- Edward Meares – double bass
- Karen Elaine Bakunin, Carole Castillo, Matt Funes, Keith Greene, Jennie Hansen, Scott Haupert, Carrie Holzman-Little, Roland Kato, Renita Koven, Vicki Miskolczy and Carol Mukogawa – viola
- Richard Altenbach, Margaret Batjer, Mario DeLeon, Julie Gigante, Henry Gronnier, Clayton Haslop, Tamara Hatwan, Amy Herschberger, Lily Ho Chen, Karen Jones, Leslie Katz, Michelle Kim, Gary Kuo, Natalie Leggett, Kathleen Lenski, Phillip Levy, Lianne Mautner, Frances Moore, Ralph Morrison, Sara Parkins, Rachel Purkin, Susan Rishik, Marc Sazer, Lisa Sutton, Lesa Terry, Roger Wilkie and Margaret Wooten – violin

=== Production ===
- Chris Roberts – executive producer, liner notes
- Dave Grusin – producer
- Lee Ritenour – producer
- Don Murray – recording, mixing
- Eric Ferguson – additional recording, Pro Tools engineer, assistant engineer
- Elliot Scheiner – additional recording
- John Hendrickson – assistant engineer
- Charlie Paakkari – assistant engineer
- Paul Read – assistant engineer
- Rory Romano – assistant engineer
- Robert Vosgien – mastering at Robert Vosgien Mastering (Burbank, California)
- Mark Wexler – project manager
- Penny Bennett – creative direction
- Margo Chase Design – art direction, design
- Lance Stadler – photography
- Elliott Marks – additional photography
- John Stoddart – additional photography
- Albert Imperato – liner notes

== Charts ==
Chart (2000)	Peak position
US Classical Crossover Albums (Billboard)	8
US Classical Albums (Billboard)	11
