= Flight to Freedom =

Studio album by Arturo Sandoval
- Released: 1991
- Studio: Clinton Recording Studios and Sound On Sound (New York, NY)
- Genre: Jazz
- Label: GRP
- Producer: Joel Dorn

Arturo Sandoval chronology
Straight Ahead (1988)	Flight to Freedom (1991)	I Remember Clifford (1992)

Flight to Freedom is an album by Cuban jazz trumpeter, pianist and composer Arturo Sandoval, first released on the GRP label in 1991.

== Reception ==
Professional ratings
Review scores
Source	Rating
Allmusic	”
The Penguin Guide to Jazz Recordings	2/4 stars

The Allmusic review stated "On his American debut, Sandoval mostly performs boppish jazz (other than the dull "Marianela") with slight touches of rock and spiced with Latin percussion. The trumpeter shows restraint on the ballads (including a tasty "Body and Soul") and displays plenty of fire on the often-funky uptempo romps, not overdoing the effortless high notes. With the assistance of the high-powered tenor of Ed Calle, the versatile guitarist Rene Luis Toledo, and a variety of talented sidemen (including guest Chick Corea on three songs), Arturo Sandoval's long overdue debut is well-rounded, exciting, and highlighted by a fast rendition of Dizzy Gillespie's "Tanga”.”

== Track listing ==
All compositions by Arturo Sandoval except as indicated.

1. "Flight to Freedom" (Danilo Pérez) - 3:50
2. "Last Time I Saw You" (Richard Eddy) - 5:04
3. "Caribeno" - 5:59
4. "Samba de Amore" (Rene Luis Toledo) - 6:09
5. "Psalm" (Chick Corea) - 7:47
6. "Rene's Song" (Rene Luis Toledo) - 5:08
7. "Body and Soul" (Frank Eyton, Johnny Green, Edward Heyman, Robert Sour) - 6:43
8. "Tanga" (Dizzy Gillespie) - 5:53
9. "Caprichosos de la Habana" - 5:08
10. "Marianela" - 5:20

== Personnel ==
- Arturo Sandoval – trumpet (1–3, 5, 6, 8–10), lead vocals (3), cowbell (3), timbales (3), flugelhorn (4, 6, 7, 10), synthesizers (8, 10), percussion (9)
- Chick Corea – acoustic piano (1, 2, 5)
- Danilo Pérez – synthesizers (1)
- Richard Eddy – synthesizers (2)
- Michael Orta – acoustic piano (3, 4, 6–8), synthesizers (9)
- Rene Luis Toledo – guitars (3, 4, 6, 8), backing vocals (3), acoustic guitar (7, 9)
- Anthony Jackson – bass (1, 2, 5)
- Nicky Orta – bass (3, 4, 6–10)
- Dave Weckl – drums (1, 2, 5, 7, 8, 10)
- Orlando Hernandez – drums (3, 4, 6, 9), backing vocals (3)
- Juanito "Long John" Oliva – percussion (1–9)
- Telmo "Portinho" Porto – percussion (9)
- Ed Calle – saxophone (1, 2, 6, 8), tenor saxophone (3, 9), EWI (3, 10), backing vocals (3), flute (4, 5)

String Section (tracks 4, 7 & 10)

- Sanford Allen, Alfred Brown, Max Ellen, Jesse Levy, Eugene Moye, Gene Orloff, John Pintavelle, Matthew Raimondi, Elliot Rosoff, and Harry Zaratzian – string players

Vocals on "Caprichosos De La Habana"

- Ed Calle, Joel Dorn, Julia Fuller, Orlando Hernandez, Pete King, Michael Orta, Nicky Orta, Arturo Sandoval and Rene Luis Toledo

== Production ==
- Dave Grusin – executive producer
- Larry Rosen – executive producer
- Joel Dorn – producer, liner notes
- Richard Eddy – co-producer, digital mixing
- Carl Griffin – associate producer, digital mixing
- Gene Paul – recording
- Jackie Brown – recording assistant
- Neil Dignon – recording assistant
- David Amlen – mix assistant
- J.B. Chupick – mix assistant
- Joseph Doughney – digital editing, post-production
- Michael Landy – digital editing, post-production
- The Review Room (New York, NY) – editing location
- Ted Jensen – mastering at Sterling Sound (New York, NY)
- Michelle Lewis – production coordinator
- Julia Fuller – production assistant, album coordinator
- Andy Baltimore – creative director
- David Gibb – graphic design
- Scott Johnson – graphic design
- Sonny Mediana – graphic design
- Andy Ruggirello – graphic design
- Dan Serrano – graphic design
- Carol Weinberg – photography
- Armand Vior – hair stylist, make-up
- Arturo Sandoval – liner notes
- Neil Tesser – liner notes
