= GRP Records =

Jazz record label (founded 1978)

- Parent company: Universal Music Group
- Founded: 1978; 48 years ago
- Founder: Dave Grusin; Larry Rosen
- Distributor: Verve Records
- Genre: Jazz
- Country of origin: U.S.
- Location: New York, NY
- Official website: vervelabelgroup.com

GRP Records (Grusin-Rosen Productions) is a jazz record label founded by Dave Grusin and Larry Rosen in 1978. Distributed by Verve Records, GRP was originally known for its digital recordings that focuses on its jazz genre.

== History ==
With Grusin and Rosen flourishing in their respective careers as a film composer, jazz musician, engineer and commercial music producer, a chance recording session for a commercial would set up what would become the seeds of their eventual partnership. Rosen had just recorded a musician named Jon Lucien in 1972 in which Lucien would sing and play for the engineer and fledging producer. Rosen was excited about the prospects of recording him and then contacted Grusin to do the musical arrangements for the potential album. The album, Rashida for RCA Victor, released in 1973, was Grusin and Rosen's first producing job and they followed up their first collaboration with Lucien with Song For My Lady for Columbia Records in 1975. Grusin during this time would not only provide arrangements for the likes of Sergio Mendes and Peggy Lee but also began a prolific partnership in Hollywood with director Sydney Pollack, that would benefit both men as they worked together for more than three decades until Pollack's death in the late 2000s. Their first film together The Yakuza for Warner Bros. would also feature one of Grusin's best friends and also a label mate in popular guitarist Lee Ritenour, who was around 19 years old at the time, and Three Days of the Condor starring Oscar Award winner Robert Redford, which is the most popular score and film of their decades-long collaboration.

=== 1975–1977 ===
In 1975 when Rosen was visiting Los Angeles CA where Grusin was working at the time, he made a proposition to Grusin to form a company together since they had already been collaborating on several projects. Grusin agreed and as soon as that happened, Dr. George Butler, who was running Blue Note Records called them to produce an album by a young musician from Detroit MI who been playing with jazz and R&B star George Benson with CTI Records named Earl Klugh. They both agreed and Klugh's self-titled album released in 1976 would be the first official release under their newly formed production company, Grusin/Rosen Productions. They would produce two more Klugh albums for Blue Note, Living Inside Your Love and Finger Paintings.

Also during this period, the pair would go on to produce another of Rosen's recording musicians for his commercials in violinist Noel Pointer, his debut album for Blue Note Phantazia and his follow-up album, Hold On. Phantazia featured the debut of flautist Dave Valentin, who would be the first artist signed to the soon-to-be-born label in 1978.

They also produced albums for other artists, including Patti Austin's Havana Candy for CTI Records, Lee Ritenour's The Captain's Journey for Elektra Records, and Yutaka Yokokura's Love Light for Alfa Records Japan, which was a hit throughout the US despite being released only in Japan, where the album was considered a commercial failure, as well as Grusin's One of a Kind for Polydor Records.

They were all successfully-produced albums, especially during the latter half of the decade, when disco had become a successful musical fad. They were also able to accomplish this with somewhat limited airplay before more radio stations that featured solely jazz would hit the airwaves, which eventually happened in later years throughout the US. Grusin and Rosen's albums were so well produced that radio stations did find a place for them, which would benefit them in the next couple of decades.

=== 1978–1981 ===
Grusin and Rosen's success as producers led to a meeting with Arista Records chief Clive Davis, whose Novus Records jazz banner had produced solid albums that were not selling despite positive reviews. Davis offered Grusin and Rosen a deal that would make them producers for at least three jazz artists per year, which the pair was not interested in doing. Grusin and Rosen wanted a logo deal that would make them established, and Davis agreed to it.

GRP/Arista Records was formed and the very first artist signed under their new deal was flautist Dave Valentin, who had made his debut on his friend Noel Pointer's albums for Blue Note. Singer Angela Bofill, who was Valentin's girlfriend at the time, was also signed to the label along with trumpet player Tom Browne, vibraphonist Jay Hoggard and the youngest performer under their banner, high school piano prodigy Bernard Wright, who was 16 years old when he recorded his debut album 'Nard in 1980, among the other artists they signed and produced.

Valentin's debut album Legends would sell more than 70,000 copies, Bofill's debut album Angie would sell over 280,000 copies and Browne's debut album Browne Sugar would sell more than 700,000 copies, which surprised many and solidified Grusin's and Rosen's reputations as producers.

Also during this period, Grusin made his first pure digital recording, the best-selling album Mountain Dance, which was recorded live with no overdubbing and utilized some of the best recording technology at the time including the digital Soundstream Editing System, which was from Salt Lake City UT. The album was recorded in five grueling days and was one of the first digital recordings produced in 1979.

Grusin then took a group of artists for a tour in Japan which was documented by the album Dave Grusin and the GRP All-Stars In Japan and featured many of the label's artists including Grusin and his brother Don Grusin, Tom Browne, Dave Valentin, Bobby Broom, Marcus Miller, Buddy Williams, and guest Japanese saxophonist Sadao Watanabe, which was recorded in fall of 1980 and would be the first of many GRP concerts that they would hold over the years there.

=== 1982 ===
Grusin and Rosen's time at Arista Records was coming to an end as Clive Davis and the label were seeing different visions for the success of the label. Davis wanted to concentrate on hit singles by the latest hot artists for extended airplay, while Grusin and Rosen were concentrated on great sound quality, performances and establishing a bigger audience for jazz at that point in time. They also felt that the albums they produced were not given the highest priority and given the back of the bus treatment with no advertising or advertising to the wrong demographic of music fans or the albums were not available on their release date. Grusin and Rosen made an amenable parting with Arista and Davis in which they were able to acquire a few albums that they produced including bestsellers such as Legends, Browne Sugar, The Hawk (Dave Valentin's follow-up album to Legends), Without Rhyme Or Reason by Scott Jarrett (brother of jazz pianist Keith Jarrett), Days Like These by Hoggard and Grusin's own albums Mountain Dance and Out of the Shadows. They were also able to acquire other albums they were involved with from other labels that included Grusin's One of a Kind from Polydor Records and Lee Ritenour's On The Line and Rio from Elektra Records, which was recorded in 1978 as a hybrid digital and analog recording that was recorded both in the US and in Brazil, while the former was a pure digital recording with no overdubbing whatsoever.

Other albums that they produced under their banner would stay with Arista, which is now owned by Sony Music Entertainment. This would also be true of artists such as Tom Browne and Angela Bofill, who was coaxed into leaving GRP by Davis for a more lucrative deal with the label that resulted in watered-down drum machine material much like Browne's. In later years, after her short-lived success under Grusin and Rosen's tutelage, Bofill would suffer some personal health-related setbacks after recording with various different labels throughout the 80's and 90's. Browne's career would not take off after such a promising start and ended up much like Bofill's throughout the rest of the 80's and Browne tried to return to his roots throughout the 1990s without much success.

Soon they would make a very important decision that would change the history of jazz, since both Grusin and Rosen both strongly felt that all of the albums they had produced for most labels were getting the "back of the bus" treatment without proper advertising or promotion. They were also disappointed that the albums they produced were not released or available at record stores on their release dates. Taking in all of these factors, Grusin and Rosen formed a record company because they wanted to be in control of all of these factors. This led to them signing established jazz stars such as Lee Ritenour, Billy Cobham, Chick Corea, Dizzy Gillespie, and Gerry Mulligan, to go along with Dave Valentin, who joined Grusin and Rosen after leaving Arista Records along with newbies, guitarist Kevin Eubanks, the group Special EFX and Diane Schuur, a blind singer-pianist from Seattle WA, who was discovered by saxophonist Stan Getz and invited to the White House in 1982 to perform with Getz for First Lady Nancy Reagan on a special that aired on PBS.

The Compact Disc Player and Compact Disc were introduced that year in Japan; Grusin and Rosen were intrigued by its audiophile sound and it was something they felt would be vital to the growth of the company.

=== 1982–1989 ===
Now established as a record company, Grusin and Rosen were pushing forward and thinking of the future and how to make the label stand out with the evolving technology of the times. Grusin and Rosen figured that the compact disc with its optical and audiophile capabilities would be a very important part of what they were trying to do to make the label successful, which was to produce high-quality recordings with the best sound and production available to them including recording venues, musicians and orchestras.

To accomplish this, they decided on a specific album that not only would introduce the best of what they were producing, but also an album that catered to those people who could afford the first CD players available for their homes, which cost $1,000 per unit at the time in 1982 and wouldn't be completely available onto the market until Christmas 1983. After much research, the Glenn Miller Band was chosen to be the first album recorded for their company in January 1983. Members of the original band, as well as special guests like singer Mel Tormé, also participated in the ambitious project recorded in New York NY. The album In the Digital Mood not only became a popular album after its release selling more than 100,000 units, but also one of the label's greatest selling albums to this day, and was recognized as such in 1992 with a "Gold Edition" to not only commemorate the label's 10th Anniversary celebration but the Gold record status the album achieved.

They followed up this best selling album with Gerry Mulligan's Little Big Horn and Grusin's Dave Grusin and the NY-LA Dream Band, which was a live concert from 1982 that was recorded in Japan and seen throughout the country. The label during this period would be known mainly for its fusion work, but two of the first three releases were the straight-ahead jazz albums by Glenn Miller Band and Mulligan. Another vital addition was recording the great Dizzy Gillespie, which helped the label even more as Grusin and Rosen teamed him up with the best of the young jazz musicians performing at the time, including saxophonist Branford Marsalis and pianist Kenny Kirkland for the album New Faces.

Compact discs were carried in limited supply in record stores but were available wherever CD player systems were sold at that time when they were first released. Knowing this, Grusin and Rosen produced CD Samplers (three in three different volumes from 1984 to 1987) that showcased the artists on the label, the sound quality, and performances due to the lack of other record labels having joined the format at that time which lasted until 1987, when a lot of the record labels made the transition to the CD format. These CDs did help gain the label an audience with the audiophiles who first bought these machines and also, to expand the label in format. Their first batches of pressed discs from 1984 until 1987 came directly from Japan by the JVC Corporation, which are audiophile in quality and were quality produced recordings that truly displayed the dynamic range of the performances, unlike an LP or cassette.

In 1984, Grusin would release his second purely digitally recorded album and his first one for his label, Night-Lines, which used even more contemporary digital equipment and instruments not unlike his 1979 effort for Arista Records, Mountain Dance. So would artist Billy Cobham and his purely digital album, Warning, who recorded this album during the year. which contained a disclaimer of "not playing your stereo at high volume due to the nature of the recording that could cause damage to your equipment".

Grusin and Rosen were approached by the JVC Corporation late in 1984 to represent them because of their standards for the highest quality in recording and for their well-regarded albums for the latest in their audio technology. So for the first time under their own banner, the label conducted its first live tour around Europe and the US during the Summer of 1985. Eventually, the label decided to have a "live session" which was videotaped at the Record Plant Recording Studio in Los Angeles CA as well, featuring all of the members that traveled including Grusin, Ritenour, Valentin, Schuur and their GRP recording members. A highlight album of the live recording at The Record Plant was released as "Live In Session" as well as a videocassette, a laserdisc and eventually DVD a long time later were released to commemorate the event. Later on, the label would go on to produce videocassettes and laserdiscs of their live concerts in their complete form that would include A GRP Christmas Collection and GRP Super Live in Concert which a showcase for the label's recent additions like the Chick Corea Elektric Band, saxophonist Tom Scott as well as the label's stars, Dave Grusin, Lee Ritenour and Diane Schuur. The label would also produce their first CD+G album sampler called GRP Digital Sampler on the Cutting Edge, which was designed for a karaoke styled CD player with the capability to be connected to a television and listen to the music on the CD as well as see a bio of the artist performing which was released in 1989.

Also in 1984 the film, Falling In Love starring Oscar winners Robert De Niro and Meryl Streep would be released by Paramount Pictures. Grusin provided the original musical score for the film, but the film had been tracked by music from Grusin's breakthrough digital album, Mountain Dance, which became the main theme for the film despite writing a purely jazz score in the same vein.

In 1985, the label released their first-ever soundtrack to any motion picture for the drama, American Flyers starring Oscar winner Kevin Costner, which was composed and performed by Lee Ritenour and Greg Mathieson, who were with the label exclusively at the time. The album was never released on CD until Varèse Sarabande finally released it in 2016.

Lee Ritenour would make his "official" debut for the label after his contract with Elektra Records had ended and his debut album was his pairing with founder Dave Grusin on the album, Harlequin, which melded Brazilian and American styles of jazz together on one of the most popular albums for the label.

In 1986, Eddie Daniels would make his Grammy-nominated debut for the label with Breakthrough, which was a fusion album of a different sort as Daniels' clarinet solos were mixed with a huge London Orchestra creating a very elaborate and popular album that melded both jazz and classical together. A year later, Daniels' follow-up album for the label To Bird With Love, would be the very first "pure" jazz recording for the label dedicated to saxophonist Charlie Parker, gaining positive reviews.

Pianist Chick Corea would also make his official debut for the label introducing a new band called Chick Corea Elektric Band, which is also the name of the album they recorded for the label and would later introduce Chick Corea Akoustic Band in 1989 with fellow members John Patitucci and Dave Weckl, who also recorded for the label along with Eric Marienthal, who was a member of Chick Corea Elektric Band between 1988 and 1994.

By 1987, the label was no longer independent as they signed a distribution deal with MCA Distributing, one of the six largest distribution companies in the US at the time. The deal was significant at the time because it helped the label reach the top of the Billboard Magazine charts as the number one jazz label in the world starting in 1988, according to the Billboard polls, as more people would have access to their recordings unlike before.

They also produced and released a similar project to that of the Glenn Miller Band dedicated to one of jazz's greatest legends, Duke Ellington. The album Digital Duke reassembled members of Duke Ellington's band under the direction of his son, Mercer, in a digital recording setting with the latest technology. The album was produced in conjunction to the USPS's official $0.22 stamp dedicated to Ellington a year earlier commemorating his 87th birthday.

The label also signed vibraphonist Gary Burton and saxophonist Tom Scott, who would make significant contributions to the label with well-received albums of their own in Reunion and Born Again, which is Scott's first pure jazz recording for the label and the first in more than a decade at the time and Them Changes, which featured music from the short-lived talk show The Pat Sajak Show that ran on CBS from January 1989 to 1990, where Scott was the musical director on.

1988 marked a couple of firsts for the label. Flautist Dave Valentin recorded his first "Live" album for the label and that for any solo artist on the label, Live at the Blue Note, which was a two-night recording that took place on May 31 and June 1 of that year, which would mark the first of a series of "Live Albums" for the artists on the label which would follow in later years with Chick Corea (Alive), The Rippingtons (Live in L.A.), and Dave Grusin Presents GRP All-Star Big Band Live!, which was the follow-up album to the original GRP All-Star Big Band from the label's 10th anniversary.

The label also recorded the first of three Christmas albums featuring artists from the label entitled "A GRP Christmas Collection" that included jazz interpretations of classic Christmas songs and some that are obscure arranged in diverse ways by the artist recording on it. The label would produce two more albums in 1991 and 1993, which was the final one under Grusin and Rosen's supervision before they departed from the label in 1994. The artists that participated in the album included the likes of Grusin, Lee Ritenour, David Benoit, Gary Burton, Tom Scott, Diane Schuur, Nelson Rangell, Arturo Sandoval, Chick Corea, Eddie Daniels, New York Voices, George Howard, Ramsey Lewis, B.B. King, Russ Freeman and Yellowjackets among others.

Grusin would win his first Academy Award for Robert Redford's 2nd film as a director, The Milagro Beanfield War, which would be released a year later as part of his last album for the label of the decade, Migration.

The label also signed popular harpist, Deborah Henson-Conant to further diversify the label much like they had done in the late 1970s which got their label off and running. Signing her to a 4-album deal in which her 4th album for the label in 1993 called Budapest, was abruptly cancelled and released by another label.

By the end of 1989, GRP is named the number one jazz label in the world by voters. Radio stations like New York NY's CD 101.9 on the East Coast and WNUA 95.5 in Chicago IL were up and running under the "smooth jazz" format where a lot of the label's stars began to shine and the label would create samplers on behalf of the record stations to promote the label and the artist. This gave them considerably strong airplay over the radio. The label would have a successful year with albums by David Benoit, Lee Ritenour, Dave Grusin, Chick Corea, Gary Burton, Diane Schuur and Nelson Rangell that would propel them into the 1990s on a high note.

Grusin would celebrate his 1988 Academy Award win with another nomination for his score and important participation for the comedy-drama, The Fabulous Baker Boys, starring Oscar Winner Jeff Bridges, Academy Award Nominee Beau Bridges (Jeff's brother) and Academy Award Nominee Michelle Pfeiffer. The film would receive multiple nominations, including Best Picture and for Grusin's invaluable contribution for Best Original Score. The album would be a best seller for the label.

=== 1990–1994 ===
In early 1990, Grusin and Rosen decided to sell the label to the MCA Corporation for the sum of $40 million in celebration of their 3-year deal with MCA Distributing. However, this was a differently structured deal in which the company would not be absorbed or merged with another within the family of labels under the MCA Records label. This particular deal was one in which the company expanded to something much bigger. GRP now had the sole exclusivity to produce and release new as well as old recordings by artists were currently on the MCA Records roster that included Larry Carlton, B.B. King, Spyro Gyra, Yellowjackets, George Howard, Acoustic Alchemy, Michael Brecker, and The Crusaders, among others.

In addition to that, GRP was also solely responsible for reissuing, remastering and releasing premiere titles from the Impulse!, Chess, Argo and Decca catalogs that featured a wealth of jazz recordings from popular jazz artists that include John Coltrane, Duke Ellington, Billie Holiday, Ella Fitzgerald, Count Basie, Ramsey Lewis, Keith Jarrett, Coleman Hawkins, Max Roach, Sonny Rollins, McCoy Tyner and many, many more. Recordings that have taken at least three decades to release at the present time and continue to be reissued currently. One of their first reissues, "Billie Holiday: The Complete Decca Recordings" won Grammy Awards in 1991.

Also in 1990, Cuban trumpet player Arturo Sandoval defected to the US and the label immediately signed him and made his debut for the label in 1991 with the album Flight To Freedom, his first five solo albums and several other appearances on the label with fellow recording artists such as Dave Valentin, Rene Luis Toledo, Dave Grusin and a well-received album dedicated to his best friend, Dizzy Gillespie, Dream Come True, which featured a collaboration with Oscar Winner Michel Legrand and albums such as A GRP Christmas Collection, and the GRP All-Star Big Band, to name a few until his final album, the critically acclaimed Swingin' for the label in 1996.

Grusin would also receive a third consecutive Academy Award Nomination for the Robert Redford drama, Havana, directed by his best friend, Sydney Pollack, in which the label released the soundtrack for the film.

In 1992, the label celebrated its 10th anniversary after being formed in 1982 in spectacular fashion as Dave Grusin and Larry Rosen assembled nearly every artist with the exception of singers Diane Schuur and Patti Austin to record the album GRP All-Star Big Band, which was recorded in January 1992 and featured prominent jazz artists such as Lee Ritenour, Arturo Sandoval, Eddie Daniels, Tom Scott, Gary Burton, Dave Weckl, Nelson Rangell, among others. The label not only released a CD with bonus tracks, but also they recorded the event which was available on both VHS and LaserDisc. The album and the band proved to be so popular that fans asked for more of the band and seeing them live in concert. They listened to the fans and did a follow-up album called Dave Grusin Presents GRP All-Star Big Band Live!, which was released in 1993 based on the tour of the band that featured most of the artist on the original recording in 1992 and some of band members who participated in that recording. They would do one final recording in 1995, All Blues, shortly before Grusin and Rosen would leave the label.

It was also fitting that the label would also pay homage to their very first release, Glenn Miller Orchestra: In the Digital Mood, which started the label and album had become a Gold Record after selling more than a million copies since its release in 1983. The label produced an elaborate "Gold Edition" featuring a bonus track not on the original release and new special artwork to commemorate the event.

The Rippingtons would record their album Live in L.A. that would feature the popular jazz group in a live setting from their September 1992 concert which was also sold as a video cassette and LaserDisc to coincide with the release of the CD in June 1993.

In 1993, the label released Dave Grusin's score to the Tom Cruise thriller The Firm, which was based on the John Grisham novel which was a blockbuster hit and the album was a best seller for the label. What made this particular soundtrack unique was that it was an all piano score by Grusin and much to everyone's surprise, received an Oscar nomination for Best Original Score by the Academy Awards branch which added another accolade for the company. The Cure would be his final soundtrack released for the label which came out after his departure in 1995.

Also that year, Sergio Salvatore, a young pianist from NJ would make his debut on the label. What made this release unique was that Salvatore was only 13 years old at the time the album was recorded and became the youngest artist ever signed to the label. Bernard Wright, who Grusin and Rosen produced in the early 1980s during their logo deal with Arista Records, was their youngest at 16 years old until Salvatore was signed. Grusin and Rosen had seen the child prodigy on the Johnny Carson Show and were highly impressed by his maturity and performance. The label would produce and release his self-titled release Sergio Salvatore during 1993 and his well-received follow up, Tune Up in 1994, which featured many of GRP's artists including Chick Corea, Gary Burton and Russ Freeman until Salvatore left the label after Grusin and Rosen departed and recorded with both Concord Records in 1996 and N2K Encoded Music in 1997, where Grusin and Rosen were both involved with that label in some capacity.

In 1994, the label would release the soundtrack to the hit and critically acclaimed documentary film Hoop Dreams, which was nominated for Academy Awards and had fallen into a lot controversy about how the film was handled by the Academy voters branch.

The label would also pay homage to a few jazz legends in albums recorded by both Dave Grusin and Arturo Sandoval. The albums The Gershwin Connection and Homage to Duke by Grusin, and I Remember Clifford by Sandoval, were purely jazz albums dedicated to George Gershwin, Duke Ellington and Clifford Brown, where were best-sellers for the label and featured elaborate artwork.

Also, by this time the label had produced several offshoots that included Stretch Records, Peak Records, and a partnership with MCA in which a few releases by artists such as Laima and Patti Austin were under the GRP/MCA partnership. This did not last long, however.

=== 1995 - 2015 ===
After founders Dave Grusin and Larry Rosen left the label in early in 1995, famed producer Tommy LiPuma was given the reins of the label with a few of Grusin and Rosen's artists staying on board, including David Benoit (who would finally leave in the mid 2000's), Arturo Sandoval (who would depart after 1996), Lee Ritenour (who would depart in 1996 and return in 2002), The Rippingtons featuring Russ Freeman (who would depart the label in 1996), Gary Burton (who would depart in 1996), Spyro Gyra (who would depart in the late 1990s), Diane Schuur (who would leave after 1997), Tom Scott (who would depart late in the 1990s), Nelson Rangell (who would depart in 1997), Joe Sample (who stayed with the label until his passing), Larry Carlton (who would go onto record with his regular group, Fourplay, and would sign with Warner Bros. Records after 1996), Acoustic Alchemy and Ramsey Lewis (who would leave after 1997). Many original or recently signed artists also departed, including Dave Valentin (who had recorded 15 albums for the label after being the very first artist signed to the label in 1978 until 1994), Chick Corea (who left for Concord Music during 1995 after his final release for GRP), Sergio Salvatore (who signed with Concord Records in 1996 and N-Coded Music Music in 1997), The Yellowjackets (who would be signed by Warner Bros. Records), B.B. King, Michael Brecker (whose contract was transferred back to Impulse! Records where he had originally signed during the 1980s), Philip Bent, Laima, Billy Taylor (who left after two albums), Special EFX, Carl Anderson, Sczachi, Teodross Avery (who Grusin and Rosen signed in 1993 had his contract transferred to Impulse!), Eddie Daniels (had already left in 1994 to sign for Shanachie Records), Patti Austin, Urban Knights (who would leave for Narada Jazz after 1997) and John Patitucci (who would leave for Concord Music in 1996) among the many artists who were not brought back when their contracts expired.

After this turnover, LiPuma brought in some familiar faces and new artists that he felt would keep Grusin and Rosen's vision of the label alive while integrating his own musical ideals. These artists included Grammy Award winners George Benson, Al Jarreau, David Sanborn, hot newcomer Mindi Abair, Keiko Matsui, Marc Antoine, Rick Braun, Chris Botti, Rachel Z, Will Downing, and former New York Yankees outfielder Bernie Williams' who made his debut album as a professional jazz guitarist in 2003 and would be his only album recorded for the label. This established group of popular jazz artists were the perfect complements to those artists who survived the purge of the label for the years following.

However, the biggest coup for GRP was signing Grammy Award-winning pianist and singer Diana Krall from Impulse!, which gave the label class and stability over the next decade or so. Her popularity had kept the label afloat for a long time (until she eventually signed with Verve in the mid-2000s), along with saxophonist Mindi Abair, who made her debut in 2003 and was an instant hit with smooth jazz fans until leaving the label after 2005, where she has become a major star for Concord Music.

Founder Dave Grusin returned for a brief stint recorded a tribute album dedicated to the music of the legendary Henry Mancini entitled Two for the Road in 1996 and released in 1997. This would be the 2nd to last album for the label, with Now Playing, a solo piano album dedicated to his music from the films he had composed the music for recorded in 2003 and eventually released in 2004 being his last official release on the label.

The label would change its name and moniker to "Great Records Period" after 1995 under LiPuma's direction since Grusin and Rosen had sold the company in 1994.

In later years, the label would take a more commercial direction signing artists like Sarah McLachlan, Ledisi and others to the label which has gone away from its jazz roots. Sadly, it has not released anything in recent years and has pretty much been retired by the Universal Music Group which the label is under their banner.

Co-founder and partner, Larry Rosen, died in 2015.

== Discography ==
=== GRP/Arista LP's ===
- GRP-5000: Angela Bofill: Angie
- GRP-5001: Dave Valentin: Legends
- GRP-5002: Urban Ensemble: The Music of Roland Vazquez
- GRP-5003: Tom Browne: Browne Sugar
- GRP-5004: Jay Hoggard: Days Like These
- GRP-5005: Angela Bofill: Angel of the Night
- GRP-5006: Dave Valentin: The Hawk
- GRP-5007: Scott Jarrett: Without Rhyme or Reason
- GRP-5008: Tom Browne: Love Approach
- GRP-5009: Dave Valentin: Land of the Third Eye
- GRP-5010: Dave Grusin: Mountain Dance
- GRP-5011: Bernard Wright: 'Nard
- GRP-5503: Tom Browne: Magic
- GRP-5504: Bobby Broom: Clean Sweep
- GRP-5505: Dave Valentin: Pied Piper
- GRP-5506: Dave Grusin and the GRP All-Stars in Japan
- GRP-5507: Tom Browne: Yours Truly
- GRP-5509: Don Blackman: Don Blackman
- GRP-5510: Dave Grusin: Out of the Shadows
- GRP-5511: Dave Valentin: In Love's Theme
- GRP-A-1004: Dave Valentin: Flute Juice
- GRP-A-1005: Homi & Jarvis: Friend of a Friend

=== 1983-1996 ===
The compact disc was vital to the label's existence and continued digital excellence throughout its history. After splitting from Arista Records to go on their own, Dave Grusin and Larry Rosen, the founders gambled on the format to bring out their spirited high quality recordings to life. From 1983 until 1987, all of their CD releases were pressed by JVC Japan which added impeccable sound and sonic clarity that made the CDs pretty much sell themselves even in audio stores that had to carry the discs to sell with the expensive CD players that were released during this time. The first official album produced and recorded for this purpose was In the Digital Mood featuring the music of big band jazz leader, Glenn Miller, which was a high end production recorded in January 1983 for two important reasons. The first was to produce an album that would suit the format's sonic capabilities and the second was that the first people who would buy the first CD players would be audiophile fanatics that would be in the range of enjoying this type of music. Grusin and Rosen's intuitions were proven right as the album went on to Gold Record status within 10 years of its release and had sold over a million copies. The label's original releases were albums that Grusin and Rosen bought or licensed from Arista Records as well as other label's such as Polydor, JVC Japan and Elektra from artists such as Dave Valentin (who was the label's first signing), Lee Ritenour, Tom Browne, Jay Hoggard, Scott Jarrett and Grusin himself. There were plenty of new and fresh album releases by jazz legends Gerry Mulligan and jazz's ambassador Dizzy Gillespie in new sonic, digital settings along with new talent being displayed by the likes of Diane Schuur, Kevin Eubanks, and Special EFX along with veteran drummer Billy Cobham, who would be joined later on by Ritenour, Chick Corea, Eddie Daniels, David Benoit, Gary Burton and Tom Scott to add more diversity to label's roster. The label would sign a distribution deal with MCA in 1987 and it was the final year that the label would have their CD titles pressed by JVC Japan for the US. All titles would be pressed in the US starting in 1988.

- GRD-9501 Dave Grusin: Dave Grusin and the NY-LA Dream Band
- GRD-9502 Glenn Miller: In the Digital Mood (The first official album produced, recorded and released by the label independently. Recorded live and digitally with former members of the band as well as New York NY musicians.)
- GRD-9503 Gerry Mulligan: Little Big Horn
- GRD-9504 Dave Grusin: Night-Lines
- GRD-9505 Special EFX: Special EFX
- GRD-9506 Kevin Eubanks: Sundance
- GRD-9507 Dave Grusin: Mountain Dance (Originally released on Arista/GRP Records)
- GRD-9508 Dave Valentin: Kalahari
- GRD-9509 GRP Sampler Vol. 1 Limited Edition (The label's first official CD sampler featuring works from the first few CDs they released for many of the first buyers of a CD player system after 1983. These would feature artists such as Gerry Mulligan, Dave Grusin, Kevin Eubanks, Dizzy Gillespie, Diane Schuur, Special EFX, Lee Ritenour and others and a second volume featuring the other albums would follow.
- GRD-9510 Diane Schuur: Deedles
- GRD-9511 Dave Grusin: Out of the Shadows (Originally released on Arista/GRP Records)
- GRD-9512 Dizzy Gillespie: New Faces
- GRD-9513 Dave Grusin: Original Motion Picture Soundtrack Themes (Planned and canceled. See Cinemagic album for details)
- GRD-9514 Dave Grusin: One of a Kind (Originally released on Polydor Records)
- GRD-9515 Dave Valentin: The Hawk (Originally released on Arista/GRP Records)
- GRD-9516 Jay Hoggard: Days Like These (Originally released on Arista/GRP Records)
- GRD-9517 Tom Browne: Browne Sugar (Originally released on Arista/GRP Records)
- GRD-9518 Scott Jarrett: Without Rhyme or Reason (Originally released on Arista/GRP Records)
- GRD-9519 Dave Valentin: Legends (Originally released on Arista/GRP Records)
- GRD-9520 Kevin Eubanks: Opening Night
- GRD-9521 Special EFX: Modern Manners
- GRD-9522 Dave Grusin & Lee Ritenour: Harlequin
- GRD-9523 Dave Valentin: Jungle Garden
- GRD-9524 Lee Ritenour: Rio (Originally released on Elektra Records)
- GRD-9525 Lee Ritenour: On The Line (Originally released on JVC Records)
- GRD-9526 Dave Valentin: In Love's Time (Originally released on Arista/GRP Records. Has been released in UK under the Vocalion Records banner)
- GRD-9527 Randy Goodrum: Solitary Nights (Limited Edition Japan release only)
- GRD-9528 Billy Cobham: Warning
- GRD-9529 GRP Magic Sampler Vol. 2 Limited Edition - Various Artists (This is the second compilation by the label featuring more tracks from their other CD releases on the label to entice buyers who have had bought one of the original CD players to buy more of their CDs)
- GRD-9531 Diane Schuur: Schuur Thing
- GRP-9532 Grusin/Schuur/Valentin/Ritenour: GRP Live in Session (This is a companion piece album of the GRP's 1985 JVC Jazz Festival tour recorded in Los Angeles CA, in front of a studio audience which was being recorded for home video. The album only features most of the live concert. A DVD reissue of this same concert was released in the 2000s)
- GRD-9533 Eddie Daniels: Breakthrough (Grammy Nominated album which was also the debut album for Daniels for the label)
- GRD-9534 Special EFX: Slice of Life
- GRD-9535 Chick Corea: The Chick Corea Elektric Band
- GRP-9536 Billy Cobham: Power Play
- GRD-9537 Dave Valentin: Light Struck
- GRD-9538 Lee Ritenour: Earth Run
- GRP-9539 Kevin Eubanks: Face To Face
- GRP-9542 Stéphane Grappelli: Stephane Grappelli Plays Jerome Kern
- GRP-9543 Special EFX: Mystique
- GRD-9544 Eddie Daniels: To Bird With Love (First official pure jazz album recorded and released by the label dedicated to work of Charlie Parker)
- GRD-9545 David Benoit: Freedom at Midnight
- GRD-9546 Chick Corea: Light Years
- GRD-9547 Dave Grusin: Cinemagic (Originally intended to be recorded in 1983 and given a catalog number GRD-9513 but was canceled. That original concept became this album featuring re-recordings of Grusin's Motion Picture Soundtracks including On Golden Pond, Tootsie, Three Days of the Condor, The Goonies, and The Heart Is A Lonely Hunter amongst others recorded in London UK)
- GRD-9548 Duke Ellington Orchestra: Digital Duke (Big band album conducted by Duke Ellington's son with former members of Ellington's fathers band performing in a live, digital setting and as dedication to the USPS Duke Ellington stamp in 1986)
- GRD-9549 New Magic Sampler (Third official compilation by the label in the same vein as the original 2 Magic Sampler releases with new material and artists)
- GRD-9550 Diane Schuur: Diane Schuur & the Count Basie Orchestra
- GRD-9551 Billy Cobham: Picture This
- GRD-9552 Kevin Eubanks: The Heat of Heat
- GRD-9553 Lee Ritenour: Portrait
- GRD-9554 Dave Valentin: Mind Time
- GRD-9555 Tom Scott: Streamlines (Last official Japanese for US released Compact Disc released)
- GRD-9556 Szakcsi: Sa: chi (1st official album released under new MCA Distribution deal pressed by JVC in US)
- GRD-9557: Yutaka: Yutaka (1st official album release of artist after failed debut in 1978 in Japan)
- GRD-9558: David Benoit: Every Step of the Way
- GRD-9559: Special EFX: Double Feature
- GRD-9560: John Patitucci: John Patitucci (Self-titled debut album from member of Chick Corea Elektric Band)
- GRD-9561: Eddie Daniels: Memos From Paradise (featuring Pianist Roger Kellaway)
- GRD-9562: Dave Grusin & Don Grusin: Sticks and Stones
- GRD-9563: Eric Marienthal: Voices of the Heart
- GRD-9564: Chick Corea: Eye of the Beholder
- GRD-9565: Kevin Eubanks: Shadow Prophets
- GRD-9566: Various Artists: Go for the Gold
- GRD-9567: Diane Schuur: About You
- GRD-9568: Dave Valentin: Live at the Blue Note
- GRD-9569: Gary Burton: Times Like These
- GRD-9570: Lee Ritenour: Festival
- GRD-9571: Tom Scott: Flashpoint
- GRD-9572: Mark Egan: A Touch of Light
- GRD-9573: Daryl Stuermer: Steppin' Out
- GRD-9574: Christmas Collection Vol. 1
- GRD-9575: Billy Cobham: Billy's Best Hits
- GRD-9576-2: Various Artists: Music Beyond the Horizon
- GRD-9577: Szakcsi: Mystic Dreams
- GRD-9578: Deborah Henson-Conant: On the Rise
- GRD-9579: Dave Grusin: Collection
- GRD-9580: Kevin Eubanks: The Searcher
- GRD-9581: Special EFX: Confidential
- GRD-9582: Chick Corea: Chick Corea Akoustic Band
- GRD-9583: John Patitucci: On the Corner
- GRD-9584: Eddie Daniels: Blackwood
- GRD-9585: Omar Hakim: Rhythm Deep
- GRD-9586: Eric Marienthal: Round Trip
- GRP-9587: David Benoit: Urban Daydreams
- GRP-9588: The Rippingtons Featuring Russ Freeman: Tourist in Paradise
- GRP-9589: New York Voices: New York Voices
- GRP-9590: Various Artists: GRP Digital Sampler: On The Cutting Edge
- GRP-9591: Diane Schuur: Collection
- GRP-9592: Dave Grusin: Migration
- GRP-9593: Nelson Rangell: Playing for Keeps
- GRP-9594: Lee Ritenour: Color Rit
- GRP-9595: David Benoit: Waiting for Spring
- GRP-9596: Various Artists: Happy Anniversary Charlie Brown!
- GRP-9597: The Rippingtons featuring Russ Freeman: Kilimanjaro
- GRP-9598: Gary Burton & Pat Metheny: Reunion
- GRP-9599: Steve Khan: Public Access
- GRP-9600: Deborah Henson-Conant: Caught in the Act
- GRP-9601: Chick Corea Elektric Band: Inside Out
- GRP-9602: Don Grusin: Raven
- GRP-9603: Patti Austin: Love Is Gonna Getcha
- GRP-9604: Kevin Eubanks: Promise of Tomorrow
- GRP-9605: The Rippingtons: Moonlighting
- GRP-9606: Dave Valentin & Herbie Mann: Two Amigos
- GRP-9607: Eddie Daniels: Nepenthe
- GRP-9608: Spyro Gyra: Fast Forward
- GRP-9609: Special EFX: Just Like Magic
- GRP-9610: Eric Marienthal: Crossroads
- GRP-9611: Larry Carlton: Collection
- GRP-9612: Carl Anderson: Pieces of a Heart
- GRP-9613: Tom Scott: Them Changes
- GRP-9614: Acoustic Alchemy: Reference Point
- GRP-9615: Lee Ritenour: Stolen Moments
- GRP-9616: Yutaka: Brazasia
- GRP-9617: John Patitucci: Sketchbook
- GRP-9618: The Rippingtons Featuring Russ Freeman: Welcome to the St. James' Club
- GRP-9619: Dave Weckl: Master Plan
- GRP-9620: The Meeting: The Meeting
- GRP-9621: David Benoit: Inner Motion
- GRP-9622: Michael Brecker: Now You See It… (Now You Don't)
- GRP-9623: Michael Paulo: Fusebox
- GRP-9624: Nelson Rangell: Nelson Rangell
- GRP-9625: Tom Schuman: Extremities
- GRP-9626: George Howard: Dancing in the Sun (Reissue of TBA Records release)
- GRP-9627: Chick Corea Akoustic Band: Alive (The 1st and only Live album that Corea would record for the label)
- GRP-9628: Diane Schuur: Pure Schuur
- GRP-9629: George Howard: Love and Understanding
- GRP-9630: Yellowjackets: Greenhouse
- GRP-9632: Claus Ogerman featuring Michael Brecker: Claus Ogerman
- GRP-9633: Amani A.W. Murray: Amani A.W. Murray
- GRP-9634: Arturo Sandoval: Flight to Freedom (Debut of the popular Grammy Award Winner after defecting from Cuba in 1990)
- GRP-9635: Eddie Daniels: ...This Is Now
- GRP-9636: Deborah Henson-Conant: Talking Hands
- GRP-9637: B.B. King: Live at the Apollo
- GRP-9638: The Crusaders: Healing the Wounds
- GRP-9640: Special EFX: Peace of the World
- GRP-9641: Various Artists: Garfield: Am I Cool or What?
- GRP-9642: Spyro Gyra: Collection
- GRP-9643: Gary Burton featuring Bob James: Cool Nights
- GRP-9644: Don Grusin: Zephyr
- GRP-9645: Lee Ritenour: Collection
- GRP-9646: Tom Scott: Keep This Love Alive
- GRP-9647: Szakcsi: Eve of Chance
- GRP-9648: Acoustic Alchemy: Back on the Case
- GRP-9649: Chick Corea Elektric Band: Beneath the Mask
- GRP-9650: GRP Christmas Collection Vol.2
- GRP-9651: The Rippingtons Featuring Russ Freeman: Curves Ahead
- GRP-9652: Voyceboxing: Voyceboxing
- GRP-9653: New York Voices: Hearts of Fire
- GRP-9654: David Benoit: Shadows
- GRP-9655: Eric Marienthal: Oasis
- GRP-9656: Dave Samuels: Natural Selection
- GRP-9657: Kenny Kirkland: Kenny Kirkland
- GRP-9658: Joe Sample: Collection
- GRP-9659: George Howard: Love Will Follow
- GRP-9660: Patti Austin: Carry On
- GRP-9661: Dudley Moore: Songs Without Words
- GRP-9662: Nelson Rangell: In Every Moment
- GRP-9663: Kim Pensyl: 3 Day Weekend
- GRP-9664: Dave Valentin: Musical Portraits
- GRP-9665: Eddie Daniels & Gary Burton: Benny Rides Again
- GRP-9666: Acoustic Alchemy: Early Alchemy
- GRP-9667: Yellowjackets: Live Wires
- GRP-9668: Arturo Sandoval: I Remember Clifford
- GRP-9669: George Howard: Do I Ever Cross Your Mind
- GRP-9670: Special EFX: Global Village
- GRP-9671: Carl Anderson: Fantasy Hotel
- GRP-9672: GRP All-Star Big Band: GRP All-Star Big Band (This album featuring almost the entire roster of musicians signed to the label as well as special guests was recorded to commemorate the label's 10th anniversary of its successful existence. A LaserDisc and VHS were released to coincide with the recording)
- GRP-9673: Dave Weckl: Heads Up
- GRP-9674: Spyro Gyra: Three Wishes
- GRP-9675: Tom Scott: Born Again
- GRP-9676: Don Grusin: No Borders
- GRP-9677: Rene Luis Toledo: The Dreamer
- GRP-9678: Sal Marquez: One for Dewey
- GRP-9679: Gerry Mulligan: Re: Birth of the Cool
- GRP-9681: The Rippingtons featuring Russ Freeman: Weekend in Monaco
- GRP-9682: Patti Austin: Live
- GRP-9683: Larry Carlton: Kid Gloves (First official recording for the label after battling illness for three years)
- GRP-9684: Brecker Brothers: Return of the Brecker Brothers
- GRP-9685: Gary Burton: Six Pack
- GRP-9686: George Howard: Steppin' Out (Reissue of TBA Records album)
- GRP-9687: David Benoit: Letter to Evan
- GRP-9688: Acoustic Alchemy: The New Edge
- GRP-9689: Yellowjackets: Like a River
- GRP-9690: Special EFX: Collection
- GRP-9691: Eric Marienthal: One Touch
- GRP-9692: Billy Taylor Featuring Gerry Mulligan: Dr. T
- GRP-9693: Yutaka: Another Sun
- GRP-9694: Phillip Bent: The Pressure (Debut album of British Flaustist to the label)
- GRP-9695: Nelson Rangell: Truest Heart
- GRP-9696: Dave Samuels: Del Sol
- GRP-9697: Lee Ritenour: Wes Bound
- GRP-9698: Acoustic Alchemy: The New Edge
- GRP-9699: Dave Valentin: Red Sun (featuring Arturo Sandoval)
- GRP-9700: New York Voices: What's Inside
- GRP-9701: Arturo Sandoval Featuring Michel Legrand: Dream Come True
- GRP-9703: Diane Schuur: Love Songs
- GRP-9706: Gold Encore Series: Digital Big Band Bash!
- GRP-9707: Gold Encore Series: I Love a Piano
- GRP-9708: Gold Encore Series: Guitar Fire
- GRP-9709: Gold Encore Series: World of Contemporary Jazz Groups
- GRP-9710: Kim Pensyl: Eyes of Wonder
- GRP-9711: Acoustic Alchemy: The New Edge
- GRP-9712: Rob Wasserman: Duets
- GRP-9713: Diane Schuur: Love Songs
- GRP-9714: Spyro Gyra: Dreams Beyond Control
- GRP-9715: Dave Grusin: Homage to Duke
- GRP-9716/7: Eddie Daniels: Under the Influence
- GRP-9718: The Rippingtons featuring Russ Freeman: Live in L.A. (The live concert was also released on LaserDisc and VHS)
- GRP-9719: Don Grusin: Native Land
- GRP-9720: Sergio Salvatore: Sergio Salvatore (Debut album of prodigy pianist who was the youngest artist signed to the label at 13 years old)
- 9GRP-721: We're All In This Together: Group AIDS Benefit
- GRP-9722: Dave Grusin: Homage to Duke
- GRP-9723: Larry Carlton: Renegade Gentleman
- GRP-9724: George Howard: When Summer Comes
- GRP-9725: John Patitucci: Another World
- GRP-9726: Jimmy Haslip: Arc
- GRP-9727: Tony Remy: Boof!
- GRP-9728: Various Artists: GRP Christmas Collection Vol. 3
- GRP-9729: Kim Pensyl: A Kim Pensyl Christmas
- GRP-9730: Jack Elliott Featuring Ray Brown: American Jazz Philharmonic
- GRP-9731: Chick Corea Elektric Band II: Paint the World
- GRP-9732: Gold Encore Series: Songbirds
- GRP-9733: Gold Encore Series: Triumphant Sax
- GRP-9734: Various Artists: GRP Christmas Collection 3 Disc Box
- GRP-9736: Tony Remy: Boof
- GRP-9737: Szakcsi: Straight Ahead
- GRP-9738: Gary Burton & Rebecca Paris: It's Another Day
- GRP-9739: David Benoit & Russ Freeman: The Benoit/Freeman Project
- GRP-9740: GRP All-Star Big Band: Dave Grusin Presents GRP All-Star Big Band Live!
- GRP-9742: Ramsey Lewis: Sky Islands
- GRP-9746: The Crusaders: Live in Japan
- GRP-9747: Gold Encore Series: Sound the Trumpets
- GRP-9748: Gold Encore Series: Balladeers!
- GRP-9749: Gold Encore Series: Feeling the Blues
- GRP-9750: Gold Encore Series: Magical Duos
- GRP-9752: Tom Scott: Reed My Lips
- GRP-9753: Billy Taylor: It's a Matter of Pride
- GRP-9754: Yellowjackets: Run for Your Life
- GRP-9755: Nelson Rangell: Yes, Then Yes
- GRP-9756: Billy Taylor: It's a Matter of Pride
- GRP-9758: Szakcsi: Straight Ahead
- GRP-9759: Tom Scott: Reed My Lips
- GRP-9760: Dave Weckl: Hard-Wired
- GRP-9761: Arturo Sandoval: Danzón (Dance On)
- GRP-9762: Sergio Salvatore: Tune Up
- GRP-9766: New York Voices: Collection
- GRP-9767: Diane Schuur & B.B. King: Heart to Heart
- GRP-9768: Eddie Daniels: Collection
- GRP-9769: Dave Valentin: Tropic Heat
- GRP-9770: Kim Pensyl: Pensyl Sketches Collection (Condensed reissue of individual Pensyl Sketches releases previously released)
- GRP-9774: Chick Corea: Expressions
- GRP-9776: Gold Encore Series: Feel the Vibes
- GRP-9777: Various Artists: Acoustic Jazz
- GRP-9778: Carl Anderson: Heavy Weather Sunlight Again
- GRP-9779: Don Grusin: Banana Fish
- GRP-9780: George Howard: A Home Far Away
- GRP-9781: Russ Freeman and The Rippingtons: Sahara
- GRP-9782: Gold Encore Series: Jazz Live
- GRP-9783: Acoustic Alchemy: Against the Grain
- GRP-9784: The Brecker Brothers: Out of the Loop
- GRP-9785: Eric Marienthal: Street Dance
- GRP-9787: David Benoit: Shaken Not Stirred
- GRP-9788: Teodross Avery Quartet: In Other Words
- GRP-9789: Dave Grusin: The Orchestral Album (Newly recorded album features work from his 1976 Discovered Again! album and other previously recorded works for the label)
- GRP-9790: Gold Encore Series: Jazz Romance
- GRP-9791: Gold Encore Series: Jazz Exotica
- GRP-9792: Gold Encore Series: Covering All the Bassists
- GRP-9793: Gold Encore Series: Beat of a Different Drummer
- GRP-9794: Stolen Moments: Red Hot + Cool
- GRP-9796: Gold Encore Series: The Joy of Christmas
- GRP-9797: Dave Grusin: The Orchestral Album
- GRP-9798: Teodross Avery Quartet: In Other Words
- GRP-9800: GRP All-Star Big Band: All Blues
- GRP-9801: Yellowjackets: Like a River
- GRP-9802: John Patitucci: Mistura Fina
- GRP-9803: Tom Scott: Night Creatures
- GRP-9805: Gary Burton & Makato Ozone: Face to Face
- GRP-9806: Billy Taylor Trio: Homage
- GRP-9808: Spyro Gyra: Love and Other Obsessions
- GRP-9809: Yellowjackets: Collection
- GRP-9810: Diana Krall: Only Trust Your Heart
- GRP-9811: Spyro Gyra: Love and Other Obsessions
- GRP-9812: Spyro Gyra: Point of View (Reissue of MCA Records album)
- GRP-9813: Spyro Gyra: Rites of Summer (Reissue of MCA Records album)
- GRP-9814: Nelson Rangell: Destiny
- GRP-9815: Urban Knights: Urban Knights I
- GRP-9817: Lee Ritenour & Larry Carlton: Larry and Lee
- GRP-9818: Arturo Sandoval: Arturo Sandoval & The Latin Train (2-disc set features a single recording of "Colors Of The Wind" from the Disney film Pocahantas)
- GRP-9819: Chick Corea: Forever & Beyond 1964–1996 (This Five Box Set features his last newly recorded album for GRP along with unreleased works and live performances)
- GRP-9821: Patti Austin: The Ultimate Collection (This release features previously unreleased material)
- GRP-9822: Arturo Sandoval: Arturo Sandoval & El Train Latino
- GRP-9823: George Benson: That's Right
- GRP-9825: Diana Krall: Stepping Out (Reissue and expanded version of original 1993 Just In Time Records release)
- GRP-9826: Russ Freeman: Holiday
- GRP-9827: Various Artists: I Got No Kick Against Modern Jazz
- GRP-9828: Dave Grusin: The Cure (Original Motion Picture Soundtrack to 1995 film of the same name)
- GRP-9829: Jerald Daemyon: Thinking About You
- GRP-9830: Nils Gessinger: Ducks 'N' Cookies
- GRP-9831: David Benoit: The Best of David Benoit 1987–1995
- GRP-9832: Various Artists: I Got No Kick Against Modern Jazz
- GRP-9833: Acoustic Alchemy: Red Dust & Spanish Lace (Reissue of MCA Records album)
- GRP-9834: Acoustic Alchemy: Natural Elements (Reissue of MCA Records album)
- GRP-9835: The Rippingtons featuring Russ Freeman: Brave New World
- GRP-9836: Yoshiko Kishino: Fairy Tale (Intended to be released in the US but was never released except in Japan)
- GRP-9837: Acoustic Alchemy: Blue Chip (Reissue of MCA Records album)
- GRP-9838: John Klemmer: Mosaic: The Best of John Klemmer
- GRP-9839: George Howard: Attitude Adjustment
- GRP-9840: Kevin Eubanks: The Best of Kevin Eubanks
- GRP-9841: Diane Schuur: Love Walked In
- GRP-9842: Spyro Gyra: Heart of the Night
- GRP-9843: Ramsey Lewis: Between the Keys
- 9844: Tom Scott & the LA Express: Bluestreak
- 9845: Acoustic Alchemy: Best Kept Secret (Video)
- 9846: Arturo Sandoval: Swingin'
- 9848: Acoustic Alchemy: Arcanum
- 98502: Nils Gessinger: Scratch Blue
- 9851: Gary Burton: Collection
- 9852: David Benoit: Remembering Christmas
- 9853: Eric Marienthal: Collection
- 9854: Larry Carlton: The Gift
- 9855: Luis Salinas: Salinas
- 9858: The Jazzmasters: The Jazzmasters III
- 9861: Urban Knights: Urban Knights II
- 9863: Diane Schuur: Blues for Schuur
- 9864: Nelson Rangell: Turning Night Into Day
- 9865: Dave Grusin: Two for the Road
- 9867: Spyro Gyra: 20/20
- 9869: Mehmet Ergin: Beyond the Seven Hills
- 98702: Ella Fitzgerald: Priceless Jazz
- 98712: Billie Holiday: Priceless Jazz
- 98722: Louis Armstrong: Priceless Jazz
- 98732: Johnny Hartman: Priceless Jazz
- 98742: John Coltrane: Priceless Jazz
- 98752: Duke Ellington: Priceless Jazz
- 98762: Sonny Rollins: Priceless Jazz
- 98772: Charles Mingus: Priceless Jazz
- 98782: Chick Corea: Priceless Jazz
- 98792: Gato Barbieri: Priceless Jazz
- 98802: Pharoah Sanders: Priceless Jazz
- 9881: Various Artists: Priceless Jazz
- 9882: Lee Ritenour: Alive in L.A.
- 98832: David Benoit: American Landscape
- 9885: George Howard: Very Best of George Howard (And Then Some)
- 9886: Various Artists: A Traditional Jazz Christmas
- 9887: Various Artists: A Contemporary Jazz Christmas
- 9888: Diane Schuur: The Very Best of Diane Schuur
- 9889: Larry Carlton: Collection Vol. 2
- 9890: Keiko Matsui: Collection
- 98912: The Rippingtons: The Best of the Rippingtons
- 98922: Crusaders: Priceless Jazz
- 9893: Yellowjackets: Priceless Jazz
- 9894: Keith Jarrett: Priceless Jazz
- 98952: Gil Evans: Priceless Jazz
- 98962: Tom Scott: Priceless Jazz
- 9897: Carmen McRae: Priceless Jazz
- 98982: Ramsey Lewis: Priceless Jazz
- 98992: Ahmad Jamal: Priceless Jazz
- 9900: Brecker Brothers: Priceless Jazz
- 99012: Various Artists: Priceless Jazz Sampler 2
- 9902: George Howard: Midnight Mood
- 9903: Spyro Gyra: Road Scholars
- 99042: Ramsey Lewis: Dance of the Soul
- 9906: George Benson: Standing Together
- 99072: Acoustic Alchemy: Positive Thinking
- 9908: Marcus Miller: Live & More
- 9909: Marc Antoine: Classical Soul
- 9910: Marc Antoine: Urban Gypsy
- 9913: Nelson Rangell: The Very Best of Nelson Rangel
- 9914: Alice Coltrane: Priceless Jazz
- 9915: John Coltrane: Priceless Jazz (More John Coltrane)
- 9916: Ella Fitzgerald: Priceless Jazz (More Ella Fitzgerald)
- 9917: Billie Holiday: Priceless Jazz (More Billie Holiday)
- 9918: Louis Armstrong: Priceless Jazz (More Louis Armstrong)
- 9919: Various Artists: Priceless Jazz Sampler 3
- 9920: Count Basie: Swingstation
- 9921: Ella Fitzgerald With Chick Webb: Swingstation
- 9922: Lionel Hampton: Swingstation
- 9923: Jimmie Lunceford: Swingstation
- 9924: Various Artists: Swingstation Sampler
- 9925: George Benson: Standing Together
- 9926: Marc Antoine: Madrid
- 99282: Nelson Rangell: The Best of Nelson Rangell
- 9929: Rachel Z: Love Is The Power
- 9930: Stephane Grappelli: Priceless Jazz
- 9931: McCoy Tyner: Priceless Jazz
- 9932: Dave Grusin: Priceless Jazz
- 9933: Stanley Turrentine/Shirley Scott: Priceless Jazz
- 9934: Freddie Hubbard: Priceless Jazz
- 9935: Various Artists: A Time for Love
- 9936: Various Artists:Cole Porter Songbook
- 9937: Various Artists: Gershwin Songbook
- 9938: Various Artists: Rodgers & Hart Songbook
- 99392: Rachel Z: Love Is the Power
- 9940: Various Artists: Priceless Jazz Sampler 4
- 9942: David Benoit: Professional Dreamer
- 9943: Various Artists: Irving Berlin Songbook
- 9944: Various Artists: Tenor Sax Ballads
- 9945: Lionel Hampton: Priceless Jazz
- 9946: John Klemmer: Priceless Jazz
- 9947: Betty Carter: Priceless Jazz
- 9948: Brecker Brothers: Priceless Jazz
- 9949: James Moody: Priceless Jazz
- 9950: Various Artists: Priceless Jazz Sampler 5
- 9951: Louis Jordan: Swingstation
- 9952: Charlie Barnet/Jimmy Dorsey: Swingstation
- 9953: Tommy Dorsey/Artie Shaw: Swingstation
- 9954: Benny Goodman: Swingstation
- 9955: Various Artists: Swingstation Sampler 2
- 9956: Joe Sample: The Song Lives On
