= The Orchestral Album =

Studio album by Dave Grusin
- Released: 1994
- Recorded: 1994
- Genre: Jazz
- Length: 63:37
- Label: GRP
- Producers: Dave Grusin & Larry Rosen

Dave Grusin chronology
Homage to Duke (1993)	The Orchestral Album (1994)	The Cure (Motion Picture Soundtrack) (1995)

The Orchestral Album is an album by American pianist Dave Grusin released in 1994, recorded for GRP Records. It contains both original recordings and new arrangements of previously released material. The arrangement of Three Cowboy Songs won the 1995 Grammy Award for Best Instrumental Arrangement.

The Orchestral Album reached No. 10 on Billboard's Jazz chart.

== Track listing ==
All tracks written by Dave Grusin; except where noted

1. "Cuba Libre" (from Havana) - 3:30
2. "Santa Clara Suite: Vayase" (from Havana) - 1:26
3. "Santa Clara Suite: Miliocia Y Refugios" (from Havana) - 1:45
4. "Santa Clara Suite Fuego Peligroso" (from Havana) - 0:59
5. "Santa Clara Suite: Epilogue" (from Havana) - 0:54
6. "Git Along, Little Doggies" - 4:38
7. "The Colorado Trail" - 5:03
8. "Cripple Creek Breakdown" - 5:01
9. Medely: "Bess You is My Woman/I Loves You Porgy" (George Gershwin, Ira Gershwin) - 5:50
10. "Lupita" - 1:09
11. "Coyote Angel" - 3:29
12. "Pistolero" - 1:47
13. "Milagro" - 2:36
14. "Fiesta" - 2:26
15. "The Heart is a Lonely Hunter" - 4:45
16. "Summer Sketches" - 12:34
17. "Condor" (theme from Three Days of the Condor) - 4:43
18. "On Golden Pond" - 3:35

== Personnel ==
- Dave Grusin – conductor (1–8, 10–14, 17), acoustic piano (6–9, 15, 18), arrangements (9), keyboards (10–14, 16), electric piano (17)
- Don Grusin – keyboards (16), synthesizers (17)
- Lee Ritenour – guitars (2, 16, 17), acoustic guitar (6–8), electric guitar (6–8)
- Eric Gale – guitars (16)
- John Pattitucci – bass (6–8)
- Abraham Laboriel – bass (10–14, 17)
- Anthony Jackson – bass (16)
- Harvey Mason – drums (6–8, 10–14, 17)
- Steve Gadd – drums (16)
- Larry Bunker – percussion (6–8)
- Michael Fisher – percussion (10–14, 17)
- Rubens Bassini – percussion (16)
- Emil Richards – cymbals (17), percussion (17)
- Dave Valentin – flute (2)
- George Young – soprano saxophone (16)
- Tom Scott – soprano saxophone (17)
- Ernie Watts – tenor saxophone (17)
- Charles Loper – trombone (17)
- Arturo Sandoval – trumpet (1, 3)
- Tiger Okoshi – trumpet (16)
- Chuck Findley – trumpet (17)
- Greig McRitchie – orchestration (1)
- Gerald Vinci – concertmaster (1–5, 10–14)
- Stuart Shaman – concertmaster (6–8)
- David Nadien – concertmaster (9)
- Ashley Arbuckle – concertmaster (15, 17, 18)
- Ettore Stratta – conductor (9)
- Harry Rabinowitz – conductor (15, 18)
- London Symphony Orchestra – orchestra (15, 17, 18)
- The NHK Strings – strings (16)
- The Tokyo Brass Ensemble – brass section (16)

== Charts ==
Chart (1993)	Peak position
Billboard Jazz Albums	10
