= Moment's Notice =

Jazz Standard by John Coltrane

"Moment's Notice" is a "classic" jazz standard composed by John Coltrane. The song was featured on Coltrane's noted 1958 recording Blue Train.

== History ==
Coltrane never recorded "Moment's Notice" after the version on Blue Train, but other soloists have treated it as a standard, particularly since the 1970s. It has been recorded by such artists as McCoy Tyner (on Supertrios, 1977, and Passion Dance, 1978), Chick Corea (with various ensembles over the years, a recorded version released on Chick Corea & Lionel Hampton - In Concert, 1978), Harry Connick, Jr (on 25, 1992), Dexter Gordon (on Manhattan Symphonie, 1978), George Coleman (on Playing Changes, 1979), Anthony Braxton (on Seven Standards, 1985), Fred Hersch (on Fred Hersch trio plays..., 1994), Mark Turner (on Yam Yam, 1994), Arturo Sandoval (on Swingin', 1996), US Navy Commodores Jazz Ensemble (on Sessions on M Street S.E., 1998), Keith Jarrett in a November 1998 performance in Newark, NJ (not released until 2018 on ECM Records' After the Fall), and Billy Hart (on Quartet, 2005).

== Style ==
"Moment's Notice" contains "unusual and quick-moving harmonic twists", according to Martin and Waters.
