= Hot House (Arturo Sandoval album) =

Studio album by Arturo Sandoval
- Released: May 19, 1998
- Studio: Criteria Studios and Sandoval Studios (Miami, Florida): New River Studios (Fort Lauderdale, Florida)
- Genre: Jazz: Latin jazz
- Length: 54:19
- Label: N2K Records
- Producer: Arturo Sandoval: Carl Griffin; Carl Valldejuli

Hot House is an album by Arturo Sandoval, released through N2K Records in 1998. In 1999, the album won Sandoval the Grammy Award for Best Latin Jazz Performance.

== Track listing ==
All songs composed by Arturo Sandoval, unless noted otherwise.

1. "Funky Cha-Cha"– 5:52
2. "Rhythm of Our World" – 5:12
3. "Hot House" (Tadd Dameron) – 5:03
4. "Only You (No Se Tu)" (Armando Manzanero) – 3:26 (Patti Austin, vocals)
5. "Sandunga" – 5:00
6. "Tito" – 5:34
7. "Closely Dancing" – 4:40
8. "Mam-Bop" – 4:57
9. "New Images" – 5:11
10. "Cuban American Medley" (Ballard MacDonald, James F. Hanley, Buddy Kaye, Sidney Lippman, Fred Wise, Jack Norworth, Albert Von Tilzer) – 5:32
11. "Brassmen's Holiday" (Mario Ruiz Armengol) – 3:31

"Cuban American Medley" contains portions of "Back Home Again in Indiana" (MacDonald, Hanley), "Take Me Out to the Ball Game" (Norworth, Von Tilzer), and the theme from the Little Lulu theatrical shorts (Kaye, Lippman, Wise). It also incorporates snippets of "The Girl I Left Behind" and "Yankee Doodle."

== Personnel ==
- Arturo Sandoval – first and second trumpets, trumpet solos, flugelhorn solo (1, 2, 4, 9), arrangements (1, 2, 4–10), synth solo (2), backing vocals (6)
- John Stephens – acoustic piano, piano solo (5, 10)
- Tim Devine – synthesizers
- Rene Toledo – acoustic guitars, electric guitars, electric guitar solo (7, 10), guitar solo (9)
- Oskar Cartaya – bass
- Dennis Marks – bass
- Willie Jones III – drums
- Edwin Bonilla – bongos, cowbell, güiro, timbales
- Manuel Castrillo – bongos, congas, güiro, timbales
- Tito Puente – timbales (6, 11), arrangements (11)
- Ed Calle – first and second alto saxophones, baritone saxophone, tenor sax solo (5, 7), arrangements (5, 7)
- Michael Brecker – tenor sax solo (1, 3, 5)
- Charles McNeill – first and second tenor saxophones, arrangements (3, 8, 10), tenor sax solo (8, 9)
- Joe Barati – fourth trombone
- Dana Teboe – first, second and third trombones
- Jason Carder – third and fourth trumpets
- Richard Eddy – arrangements (1, 2, 4, 9)
- German Pffiferrer – arrangements (6)
- Patti Austin – vocals (4)
- Rey Ruiz – lead and backing vocals (6)

=== Production ===
- Phil Ramone – executive producer
- Arturo Sandoval – producer, liner notes
- Carl Griffin – co-producer
- Carl Valldejuli – co-producer, management
- Eric Schilling – recording, mixing, mastering
- Ron Taylor – recording, mixing
- Jay Giron – recording assistant, mix assistant
- Alan Goldwater – recording assistant, mix assistant
- Brad Kinney – recording assistant, mix assistant
- Christopher Spahr – recording assistant, mix assistant
- Gateway Mastering (Portland, Maine) – mastering location
- Shanna Busman – creative director
- Jennifer Collins – art direction
- Jay Strauss – photography
