= Jorge Calandrelli =

Argentine composer and conductor (1939–2026)

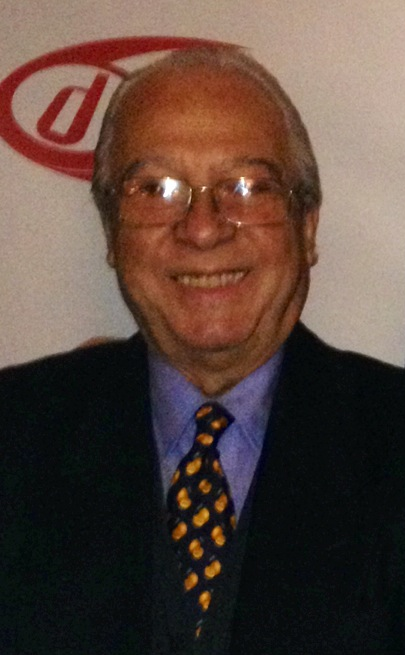
- Calandrelli in 2014

Background information
- Born: December 31, 1939; Buenos Aires, Argentina
- Died: May 4, 2026 (aged 86)
- Occupations: Composer, arranger, conductor

Jorge Calandrelli (December 31, 1939 – May 4, 2026) was an Argentine composer, arranger, and conductor known for his work with Barbra Streisand, Celine Dion, Arturo Sandoval, Yo-Yo Ma, Tony Bennett, Elton John, Lady Gaga, and John Legend. He won 6 Grammy Awards and received 28 nominations. He won the Latin Grammy Award for Producer of the Year and Best Instrumental Album for his work on A Time for Love by Arturo Sandoval in 2010.

Calandrelli was nominated twice for an Academy Award for his work on The Color Purple and Crouching Tiger, Hidden Dragon.

== Life and career ==
Calandrelli's mother was a skilled pianist. Both his father and grandfather were medical doctors and expected him to follow their path. At age 4, Calandrelli started playing the piano by ear and took lessons at age 8.

In his late teens, with both of his parents' support, Calandrelli traveled to Europe to pursue a career in music. He arrived in Los Angeles in 1968 and collaborated with composer and arranger Clare Fischer. Inspired by him, Calandrelli decided to go back to Argentina and continue honing his skills.

He later returned to the United States with recommendation letters from the record labels he had worked with in Argentina. He recorded Russian-American conductor Andre Kostelanetz and a 65-piece orchestra at CBS' studio in New York.

Calandrelli started arranging for different artists, achieving wider recognition in 1981 with first Grammy Award nomination for Best Instrumental Arrangement for his work on "Forget the Woman" by Eddie Daniels. In 1987, he was nominated three times at the 29th Grammy Awards: in the Best Arrangement on an Instrumental category for "Solfeggietto/Metamorphosis" by Eddie Daniels and "The First Letter" from The Color Purple soundtrack and in the Best Instrumental Arrangement Accompanying Vocals category for Tony Bennett's version of Daniels' "Forget The Woman ".

Calandrelli's work with Bennett included twelve recorded albums, six Grammy Nominations and two Grammy Awards won. Bennett's 2011 album "Duets II", arranged and conducted by Calandrelli debuted at No. 1 on the Billboard 200, Jazz Albums and Traditional Jazz Albums charts. This same No. 1 debut was achieved by Bennett's 2014 collaborative album with Lady Gaga "Cheek to Cheek", also arranged and orchestrated by Calandrelli.

He arranged and conducted on eight Barbra Streisand albums, including "A Love Like Ours", "Timeless: Live in Concert", "The Christmas Collection" and "Walls". He was also credited on four Celine Dion albums, including "A New Day Has Come" and "One Heart". His work with cellist Yo-Yo Ma earned him two Grammy Awards and three nominations.

Calandrelli produced, played the piano, composed, arranged and conducted Plácido Domingo's 2008 album "Amore Infinito", based on lyrics by Pope John Paul II. The album contains duets by Josh Groban, Katherine Jenkins, Andrea Bocelli, Vanessa Williams and Plácido Domingo Jr.

Calandrelli was credited as arranger on the 2022 album "Fifty" by The Manhattan Transfer featuring the WDR Funkhausorchester. The album was nominated for Best Jazz Vocal Album at the 65th Annual Grammy Awards.

Calandrelli died on May 4, 2026, at the age of 86.

== Awards ==
=== Golden Score Awards ===
The American Society of Music Arrangers and Composers (ASMAC) honored Calandrelli with the 2014 Golden Score Award for Arranging.

=== Academy Awards ===
Calandrelli was nominated twice for the Academy Award for his work on The Color Purple, directed by Steven Spielberg, and Crouching Tiger, Hidden Dragon, directed by Ang Lee.

=== Latin Grammy Awards ===
| Year | Title | Artist | Category | Result |
|---|---|---|---|---|
| 2010 | A Time for Love | Arturo Sandoval | Best Instrumental Album | Won |
| 2010 | - | - | Producer of the Year | Won |
| 2020 | Tango Argentino: Gardel y Piazzolla | Jorge Calandrelli | Best Tango Album | Nominated |

=== Grammy Awards ===
| Year | Title | Artist | Category | Result |
|---|---|---|---|---|
| 1981 | Forget the Woman | Eddie Daniels | Best Instrumental Arrangement | Nominated |
| 1987 | Solfeggietto/Metamorphosis | Eddie Daniels | Best Arrangement on an Instrumental | Nominated |
| 1987 | The First Letter | Quincy Jones | Best Arrangement on an Instrumental | Nominated |
| 1987 | Forget the Woman | Tony Bennett | Best Instrumental Arrangement Accompanying Vocals | Nominated |
| 1988 | Any Time, Any Season | Sam Most | Best Arrangement on an Instrumental | Nominated |
| 1991 | Body and Soul | Tony Bennett | Best Instrumental Arrangement Accompanying Vocals | Nominated |
| 1996 | Atras Da Porta | Ettore Stratta | Best Instrumental Arrangement | Nominated |
| 1996 | Manha De Carnaval | Ettore Stratta | Best Instrumental Arrangement | Nominated |
| 1997 | The Fifth Season | Eddie Daniels | Best Instrumental Composition | Nominated |
| 1997 | Summer | Eddie Daniels | Best Instrumental Arrangement | Nominated |
| 1999 | Soul of the Tango - The Music of Astor Piazzolla | Yo-Yo Ma | Best Classical Crossover Album | Won |
| 1999 | Tango Remembrances | Yo-Yo Ma | Best Instrumental Composition | Nominated |
| 2000 | Chelsea Bridge | Wynton Marsalis, Tony Bennett | Best Instrumental Arrangement | Nominated |
| 2000 | Day Dream | Tony Bennett | Best Instrumental Arrangement Accompanying Vocalist(s) | Nominated |
| 2001 | The Summer Knows/Estate | Ettore Stratta | Best Instrumental Arrangement | Nominated |
| 2001 | Dream | Ettore Stratta | Best Instrumental Arrangement Accompanying a Vocalist(s) | Nominated |
| 2002 | A Love Before Time | Coco Lee | Best Song Written for a Motion Picture or other Visual Media | Nominated |
| 2003 | Esta Tarde Vi Llover | José Cura | Best Instrumental Arrangement Accompanying Vocalist(s) | Nominated |
| 2004 | Obrigado Brazil | Yo-Yo Ma | Best Classical Crossover Album | Won |
| 2004 | Chega De Saudade | Yo-Yo Ma | Best Instrumental Arrangement Accompanying Vocalist(s) | Nominated |
| 2004 | Oblivion | Regina Carter | Best Instrumental Arrangement | Nominated |
| 2005 | Libertango | Yo-Yo Ma | Best Instrumental Arrangement | Nominated |
| 2006 | Time to Smile | Tony Bennett | Best Instrumental Arrangement Accompanying Vocalist(s) | Nominated |
| 2007 | For Once in My Life | Tony Bennett, Stevie Wonder | Best Instrumental Arrangement Accompanying Vocalist(s) | Won |
| 2008 | Cry Me a River | Ella Fitzgerald | Best Instrumental Arrangement Accompanying Vocalist(s) | Nominated |
| 2012 | Who Can I Turn To (When Nobody Needs Me) | Tony Bennett, Queen Latifah | Best Instrumental Arrangement Accompanying Vocalist(s) | Won |
| 2018 | Every Time We Say Goodbye | Clint Holmes, Jane Monheit | Best Arrangement, Instruments and Vocals | Nominated |
