= Swingin' (Arturo Sandoval album) =

Studio album by Arturo Sandoval
- Released: 1996
- Recorded: January 6–9 & 14–18, 1996
- Studio: Sound On Sound (New York City, New York): Criteria Studios (Miami, Florida)
- Genre: Jazz: Swing music
- Length: 71:19
- Label: GRP Records
- Producer: Arturo Sandoval: Carl Griffin

Swingin' is a jazz album by Arturo Sandoval released in 1996.

The album focuses on swing rhythms instead of Latin music. The album has been cited as "one of Arturo Sandoval's finest recordings," and a "nice addition to the Sandoval library", but classic Sandoval rather than attempting anything too innovative. The line up features clarinetist Eddie Daniels, tenorists Michael Brecker and Ed Calle, trombonist Dana Teboe and guitarist Mike Stern.

== Track listing ==
All songs written by Arturo Sandoval, except where noted. Tracks 2–4, 6 & 8–10 arranged by Richard Eddy and Arturo Sandoval; Transcription on Track 7 by Richard Eddy and Ed Calle.

1. "Moontrane" (Woody Shaw) - 5:40
2. "Swingin'" - 8:15
3. "Moment's Notice" (John Coltrane) - 7:18
4. "Streets of Desire" - 7:43
5. "Real McBop" - 6:08
6. "Weirdfun" - 6:27
7. "Dizzy's Atmosphere" (Dizzy Gillespie) - 3:50
8. "Reflection" - 7:32
9. "Woody" - 7:11
10. "It Never Gets Old" - 5:25
11. "Mack the Knife" (Marc Blitzstein, Bertolt Brecht, Kurt Weill) - 5:41

== Personnel ==
- Arturo Sandoval – trumpet (1, 3, 5–10), flugelhorn (2, 11), acoustic piano (4)
- Joey Calderazzo – acoustic piano (1–3, 5–10)
- Mike Stern – guitars (4, 6, 10)
- John Patitucci – bass
- Gregory Hutchinson – drums
- Ed Calle – tenor saxophone (1, 3, 5, 6)
- Michael Brecker – tenor saxophone (3, 5, 9)
- Eddie Daniels – clarinet (2, 7)
- Dana Teboe – trombone (1)
- Clark Terry – trumpet (11), flugelhorn (11)

=== Production ===
- Carl Valldejuli – executive producer, production assistant, additional photography
- Arturo Sandoval – producer
- Carl Griffin – co-producer
- Jim Anderson – recording
- Ben Wisch – recording
- John Reigart – recording assistant
- Ted Stein – additional engineer
- Ron Taylor – mixing
- Chris Carroll – mix assistant
- Scott Kieklak – mix assistant
- Allan Tucker – mastering at Foothill Digital (New York, NY)
- Hollis King – art direction
- Freddie Paloma – graphic design
- David Lance Goines – photography
- Bret Primack – liner notes
