= I Remember Clifford =

I Remember Clifford may refer to:

- I Remember Clifford (song), a 1956 song by Benny Golson
- I Remember Clifford (album), a 1992 album by Arturo Sandoval

== See also ==
- Clifford Brown, jazz trumpeter
