= A Time for Love (Arturo Sandoval album) =

Studio album by Arturo Sandoval
- Released: May 11, 2010
- Studio: Capitol Studios (Hollywood, California): G Studio Digital (Studio City, California); Firehouse Studios (Pasadena, California); Tury's Music Recording Studio (Coral Gables, Florida)
- Genre: Latin jazz
- Length: 68:04
- Label: Concord
- Producer: Jorge Calandrelli: Gregg Field; Ralf Kemper

Arturo Sandoval chronology
Rumba Palace (2007)	A Time for Love (2010)

A Time for Love is a studio album by Cuban performer Arturo Sandoval. It was released by Concord Records on May 11, 2010. The album was produced by Jorge Calandrelli and Gregg Field and features collaborations by Chris Botti, Kenny Barron and Monica Mancini.

== Composition ==
The album includes a collection of classical pieces, standards, and ballads written by several writers such as Gabriel Fauré, Johnny Mandel, Johnny Mercer, Ogden Nash, Kurt Weill, Bruno Brighetti, Bruno Martino, Maurice Ravel, George Gershwin, Ira Gershwin, DuBose Heyward, Marty Panzer, Ástor Piazzolla, Charlie Chaplin, Geoffrey Parsons, James Phillips, Sammy Cahn, Jimmy Van Heusen, Otto Harbach, Jerome Kern, Alan Bergman, Marilyn Bergman, Michel Legrand and Cole Porter. Sandoval originally wanted to record and release the album by himself, until pianist Shelly Berg brought him to Gregg Field, of Concord Records, who brought in Grammy Award-winning arranger Jorge Calandrelli. They co-produced while Calandrelli arranged eight of the nine string charts, Berg arranged the rest and brought in his trio to back up Sandoval. Sandoval mentioned that his two greatest inspirations for this album were trumpeter Bobby Hackett's playing with the Jackie Gleason Orchestra, and the album Clifford Brown with Strings.

== Reception ==
Professional ratings
Review scores
Source	Rating
Allmusic	4.5/5 stars
Billboard	positive

The critical reception for the album has been extremely positive. Dan Oullette of Billboard magazine named the album "a gem" and the zenith of Sandoval's 20-plus-year recording career. He also praised the performer's expanded repertoire, especially for the selection of the songs "Oblivion", with the collaboration from Monica Mancini, and "Pavane Pour une Infante Défunte", with Chris Botti. While reviewing the album, Thom Jurek of Allmusic said: "It's tempting to call A Time for Love Sandoval's masterpiece, but that is based on the sharp contrast with virtually everything else in his catalog; only time will reveal whether or not it is." Jurek also pointed out the emotional depth of the performer, and also named "stellar" the collaborations with Kenny Barron and Shelly Berg. At the 11th Latin Grammy Awards, the album earned the accolade for Best Instrumental Album and won Jorge Calandrelli and Gregg Field the award for Producer of the Year. A Time for Love also received a nomination for Best Engineered Album, for Gregg Field and Don Murray (engineers), and Michael Bishop (mastering engineer).

== Track listing ==
No.	Title	Writer(s)	Length
1.	"Après un Rêve (After a Dream)"	Gabriel Fauré	5:09
2.	"Emily"	Johnny Mandel, Johnny Mercer	4:25
3.	"Speak Low"	Ogden Nash, Kurt Weill	4:37
4.	"Estate"	Bruno Brighetti, Bruno Martino	4:00
5.	"A Time for Love"	Mandel	5:06
6.	"Pavane Pour une Infante Défunte (Pavane for a Dead Princess)" (featuring Chris Botti)	Maurice Ravel	5:14
7.	"I Loves You Porgy"	George Gershwin, Ira Gershwin, DuBose Heyward	5:15
8.	"Oblivion (How to Say Goodbye)" (featuring Monica Mancini)	Gregg Field, Marty Panzer, Ástor Piazzolla	5:26
9.	"Pavane"	Fauré	4:52
10.	"Smile"	Charlie Chaplin, Geoffrey Parsons, James Phillips	4:02
11.	"All the Way"	Sammy Cahn, Jimmy Van Heusen	4:05
12.	"Smoke Gets in Your Eyes"	Otto Harbach, Jerome Kern	4:24
13.	"Windmills of Your Mind" (featuring Shelly Berg)	Alan Bergman, Marilyn Bergman, Michel Legrand	4:24
14.	"Every Time We Say Goodbye" (featuring Kenny Barron)	Cole Porter	5:54

== Personnel ==
Musicians

- Arturo Sandoval – trumpet, flugelhorn, vocals (4, 10), arrangements (13)
- Shelly Berg – grand piano (1–13), arrangements (3, 7, 13), rhythm arrangements (4, 5, 10, 12)
- Kenny Barron – grand piano (14)
- Chuck Berghofer – bass
- Gregg Field – drums, percussion
- Chris Botti – trumpet (6)
- Jorge Calandrelli – arrangements (1, 6, 9), string arrangements (3, 7, 13)
- Mark Joggerst – arrangements (14)
- Monica Mancini – vocals (8)

String Section

- Jorge Calandrelli – conductor
- Bruce Dukov – concertmaster
- Christine Ermacoff, Vanessa Freebairn-Smith, Trevor Handy and Dennis Karmazin – cello
- Alma Fernandez, Keith Greene, Darren McCann and Harry Shirinian – viola
- Charlie Bisharat, Darius Campo, Kevin Connolly, David Ewart, Tamara Hatwan, Tiffany Yi Hu, Razdan Kuyumijian, Songa Lee, Natalie Leggett, Phillip Levy, Liane Mautner, Robin Olson and Searmi Park – violin

== Production ==
- John Burk – executive producer
- Gregg Field – producer, recording, mixing, Pro Tools editing
- Jorge Calandrelli – producer (1–13)
- Ralf Kemper – producer (14)
- Don Murray – recording
- Waldy Dominguez – additional recording
- Gerrit Kinkel – additional recording
- Steve Genewick – assistant engineer, additional mixing
- Milton Gutierrez – assistant engineer
- Michael Bishop – additional mixing, mastering
- Seth Presant – additional mixing
- Phil Ramone – additional mixing
- Five/Four Productions, Ltd. (Shaker, Ohio) – mastering location
- Mary Hogan – A&R
- Larissa Collins – art direction
- Albert J. Roman – package design
- Manny Iriarte – photography
- David Ritz – liner notes
- Jorge Pinos – management

== Chart performance ==
Chart (2010)	Peak position
Greek Albums (IFPI)	30
US Top Jazz Albums (Billboard)	18
