= One of a Kind (Dave Grusin album) =

Studio album by Dave Grusin
- Released: 1977
- Recorded: 1977
- Studios: Electric Lady Studios, New York City
- Genre: Smooth jazz
- Length: 36:03
- Labels: Polydor (1977); GRP (1984)
- Producers: Dave Grusin & Larry Rosen

Dave Grusin chronology
Discovered Again! (1976)	One of a Kind (1977)	The Champ (1979)

1984 reissue

Professional ratings
Review scores
Source	Rating
AllMusic	3/5 stars

One of a Kind is an album by American pianist Dave Grusin released in 1977, recorded for the Polydor label. It was reissued in 1984 by GRP Records.

== Track listing ==
1. "Modaji" (Dave Grusin) - 7:42
2. "The Heart is a Lonely Hunter" (Grusin, Peggy Lee) - 6:13
3. "Catavento" (Milton Nascimento) - 4:04
4. "Montage" (Grusin) - 9:20
5. "Playera" (Enrique Granados) - 8:44

== Personnel ==
- Dave Grusin – Fender Rhodes, acoustic piano (2, 4, 5), Oberheim Polyphonic Synthesizer (2, 4), Minimoog (2, 4), additional percussion (4), percussion (5), arrangements and conductor
- Ed Walsh – Oberheim Polyphonic synthesizer programming
- Francisco Centeno – electric bass (1, 3), additional electric bass (4)
- Anthony Jackson – electric bass (4)
- Ron Carter – double bass (2, 5)
- Steve Gadd – drums (1, 3–5)
- Ralph MacDonald – percussion (1, 3, 4)
- Larry Rosen – triangle (4)
- Grover Washington Jr. – soprano saxophone (1, 5)
- Don Elliot – mellophone (1), backing vocals (1)
- Dave Valentin – flute (3, 4)
- Paul Gershman – string concertmaster
- Gene Bianco – string contractor
- Seymour Barab, David Davis, Peter Dimitriades, Lewis Eley, Max Hollander, Regis Iandiorio, Theodore Israel, Raymond Kunicki, Richard Maximoff, Marvin Morgenstern, Ralph Oxman, Noel Pointer and Paul Winter – string players

=== Production ===
- Dave Grusin – producer
- Larry Rosen – producer, recording, mixing
- Michael Frondelli – assistant engineer
- Bob Ludwig – mastering at Masterdisk (New York, NY)
- Donna Putney – production coordinator
- Gregory Heisler – cover and liner photograph

1984 CD reissue

- Ted Jensen – mastering at Sterling Sound (New York, NY)
- Josiah Gluck – production supervisor
- Peter Lopez – production coordinator
- Mitchell Funk – photography
- Andy Baltimore – art direction, art design, black and white photography
- Dan Serrano – art design
- Larry Rosen – liner notes

== Charts ==
Chart (1978)	Peak position
Billboard Jazz Albums	11
