= Live at the Blue Note (Dave Valentin album) =

Live album by Dave Valentin
- Released: 1988
- Genre: Latin jazz
- Label: GRP
- Producer: Dave Valentin and Eric Kressmann

Professional ratings
Review scores
Source	Rating
AllMusic	4.5/5 stars

Live at the Blue Note is an album by jazz musician Dave Valentin. It was released in 1988. The album features Bill O'Connell (Kawai Electric Piano and Yamaha DX7), Lincoln Goines (bass), Robert Ameen (drums), and Giovanni Hidalgo (percussion and congas).

== Track listing ==
1. "Cinnamon & Clove"
2. "Columbus Avenue"
3. "Footprints"
4. "Mountain Song"
5. "Marcosinho"
6. "Blackbird"
7. "Monkey Buttons"
8. "Dansette"
9. "Afro Blue"

== Production ==
- Recorded live at the Blue Note, New York City on May 31 and June 1, 1988.
