= Homage to Duke =

Studio album by Dave Grusin
- Released: 1993
- Recorded: 1993
- Studio: Sunset Sound (Hollywood, California)
- Genre: Jazz
- Length: 49:59
- Label: GRP
- Producer: Dave Grusin & Larry Rosen

Dave Grusin chronology
Dave Grusin and the GRP All-Star Big Band (1993)	Homage to Duke (1993)	The Orchestral Album (1994)

Homage to Duke is an album by American pianist Dave Grusin released in 1993, recorded for GRP Records, and is Grusin's interpretation of Duke Ellington's music.

The album was well received. In addition to Mood Indigo winning the 1994 Grammy Award for Best Instrumental Arrangement, Scott Yanow of AllMusic praised this effort as "a respectful and well-conceived tribute".

Homage to Duke reached No. 2 on Billboard's Jazz chart.

== Track listing ==
1. "Cotton Tail" (Duke Ellington) - 4:10
2. "Things Ain't What They Used to Be" (Mercer Ellington, Ted Persons) - 6:45
3. "Satin Doll" (Duke Ellington, Billy Strayhorn, Irving Mills)- 5:22
4. "Mood Indigo" (Duke Ellington, Barney Bigard, Irving Mills) - 5:20
5. "Just Squeeze Me (But Please Don't Tease Me)" (Duke Ellington, Lee Gaines) - 4:56
6. "Caravan" (Juan Tizol) - 6:16
7. "East St. Louis Toodle-Oo" (Duke Ellington, Bubber Miley) - 4:26
8. "C-Jam Blues" (Duke Ellington) - 5:45
9. "Sophisticated Lady" (Duke Ellington, Irving Mills, Mitchell Parish - 3:28
10. "Take the "A" Train" (Billy Strayhorn) - 3:21

== Personnel ==
- Dave Grusin – grand piano
- Brian Bromberg – bass (1–8)
- John Pattitucci – arco bass (7), bass (10)
- Harvey Mason – drums (1–8, 10)
- Pete Christlieb – tenor saxophone (1, 2)
- Tom Scott – tenor saxophone (5, 7, 8)
- Eddie Daniels – clarinet (4)
- John Lowe – bass clarinet (4, 10)
- Steve Kujala – alto flute (4, 10), C flute (4, 10)
- Ronnie Lang – C flute (4, 10)
- John Clark – English horn (4, 10), oboe (4, 10)
- George Bohanon – trombone (1, 2, 5, 7, 8)
- Clark Terry – trumpet (1, 2, 7, 8), flugelhorn (1, 5, 8), "mumbles" (2), vocal (5)
- David Duke – French horn (4, 10)
- Brian O'Connor – French horn (4, 10)
- Richard Todd – French horn (4, 10)
- Tommy Johnson – tuba (4, 10)

=== Production ===
- Larry Rosen – executive producer
- Dave Grusin – executive producer, producer, arrangements
- Don Murray – recording, mixing
- Mike Kloster – recording assistant, mix assistant
- Geoff Gillette – additional recording
- Neal Avron – additional recording assistant
- Robert Vosgien – digital editing at CMS Digital (Pasadena, California)
- Wally Traugott – mastering at Capitol Studios (Hollywood, California)
- Joseph Doughney, Michael Landy and Adam Zelinka – post production at The Review Room (New York City, New York)
- Michael Pollard – production coordinator
- Diane Dragonette – production coordination assistant
- Sonny Mediana – production director
- Sharon Franklin – production direction assistant
- Andy Baltimore – creative director
- Scott Johnson – art direction
- Dan Serrano – art direction
- Alba Acevedo – design
- Jackie Salway – design
- Chuck Stewart – front cover photography
- William P. Gottlieb – black and white photography
- Frank Driggs' collection – black and white photography

== Charts ==
Chart (1993)	Peak position
Billboard Jazz Albums	2
