= Direct-to-disc recording =

Direct-to-disc recording refers to sound recording methods that bypass the use of magnetic tape recording and record audio directly onto analog disc masters.

== Professional analog sound recording ==
Most sound recordings for records before the 1950s were made by cutting directly to a master disc. Recording via magnetic tape became the industry standard around the time of the creation of the LP format in 1948, and these two technological advances are often seen as being joined, although 78 rpm records cut from tape masters continued to be manufactured for another decade.

The first commercial release of direct-to-disc microgroove LP records was from the Nippon Columbia label, in 1969 – the series entitled "Columbia 45rpm Direct Cutting Series". And in the mid-late 1970s, a small number of albums recorded direct-to-disc began to appear again on the market and were marketed as "audiophile" editions, promising superior sound quality compared with recordings made using the more common multi-track tape recording methods. A small number of direct-to-disc albums continue to be recorded and released in the 2020s.

To make a direct-to-disc recording, musicians would typically play one 15-minute "live" set in a recording studio per LP side using professional audio equipment. The recording was made without multitrack recording and without overdubs. The performance was carefully engineered and mixed live in stereophonic sound. During the performance, the analog disc cutting head engages the master lacquer from which sides of an LP record are ultimately derived and is not stopped until the entire side is complete.

Such a direct-to-disc recording was often simultaneously recorded onto a two-track master tape for subsequent pressing in the traditional manner. Although such tapes were often made to preserve the recordings in case the direct-to-disc process failed or the master disc became damaged before the final product could be produced, direct-to-disc albums were almost never re-issued as standard albums made from tape masters. One exception to this was Sheffield Lab's 1976 direct-to-disc LP release of Dave Grusin's Discovered Again! which was re-released a few years later as a conventional LP mastered from the tapes recorded as a backup during the recording sessions for the album.

== Advantages ==
Technically, direct-to-disc recording is believed to result in a more accurate, less noisy recording through the elimination of up to four generations of master tapes, overdubs, and mix downs from multi-tracked masters. The method bypasses problems inherent in analog recording tape such as tape hiss.

== Disadvantages ==
Although the spontaneity of performance is preserved, no overdubbing or editing is possible. It becomes more challenging for the musicians, engineers and producers, whose performances will be captured "warts and all." In the event of aborted sides, expensive lacquers are wasted and cannot be used again. According to Robert Auld of the Audio Engineering Society: "It was a notoriously difficult way to record; the musicians and all concerned had to record a complete LP side without any serious musical or technical mistakes."

Some artists maintain that musical instruments may drift out of tune: it is not possible to keep instruments in tune for the length of the LP side. This is why many professional musicians have always had to tune up their instruments themselves during live shows and often even in the middle of a song.
