= Heart of the Night =

Studio album by Spyro Gyra
- Released: April 23, 1996
- Recorded: 1996
- Studio: BearTracks Studios (Suffern, New York)
- Genre: Jazz, smooth jazz
- Length: 53:24
- Label: GRP
- Producer: Jay Beckenstein; Jeremy Wall

Spyro Gyra chronology
Love and Other Obsessions (1995)	Heart of the Night (1996)	20/20 (1997)

Professional ratings
Review scores
Source	Rating
Allmusic	4/5 stars

Heart of the Night is the nineteenth album by the American jazz group Spyro Gyra, released in 1996 by GRP Records.

== Track listing ==
1. "Heart of the Night" (Jay Beckenstein) – 4:34
2. "De La Luz" (Julio Fernandez) – 5:14
3. "Westwood Moon" (Tom Schuman) – 4:56
4. "Midnight" (Jeremy Wall) – 4:26
5. "Playtime" (Beckenstein) – 4:34
6. "Surrender" (Beckenstein) – 4:47
7. "Valentino's" (Schuman) – 4:56
8. "Believe" (Fernandez) – 5:11
9. "As We Sleep" (Scott Ambush) – 4:58
10. "When Evening Falls" (Beckenstein) – 4:59
11. "J Squared" (Beckenstein, Joel Rosenblatt) – 4:49
12. "Best Thing" (Beckenstein) [Bonus track] – 4:34

== Personnel ==
Spyro Gyra

- Jay Beckenstein – saxophones
- Tom Schuman – keyboards
- Julio Fernandez – guitars, vocals (2)
- Scott Ambush – bass
- Joel Rosenblatt – drums

Additional personnel

- Steve Skinner – programming (1)
- Bashiri Johnson – percussion
- Dave Samuels – marimba (2, 7, 9, 10), vibraphone (2, 7, 9, 10)
- Randy Brecker – trumpet (4)
- Jesse Levy – cello (2, 9)
- Eugene Moye – cello (2, 9)
- Chieli Minucci – arrangements (1)
- Jeremy Wall – vocal arrangements (1), cello arrangements (2, 9)
- Porter Carroll – vocals (1)
- Vaneese Thomas – vocals (1)

The No Sweat Horns (Tracks 3 & 5)

- Scott Kreitzer – saxophones, flutes, horn arrangements
- Randy Andos – trombone
- Barry Danielian – trumpet

=== Production ===
- Jay Beckenstein – producer
- Jeremy Wall – assistant producer
- Doug Oberkircher – recording, mixing
- Kristin Koerner – assistant engineer
- Scott Hull – mastering at Masterdisk (New York City, New York)
- Hollis King – art direction
- Jason Claiborne – graphic design
- Donna Raineri – photography
- Phil Brennan – management
