= Seven Standards =

Seven Standards (1985), Vols. 1 & 2

Studio album by Anthony Braxton
- Released: 1985
- Recorded: January 30–31, 1985
- Genre: Jazz
- Label: Magenta

Professional ratings
Review scores
Source	Rating
Allmusic	2.5/5 stars
Allmusic	2.5/5 stars

Seven Standards (1985), Vols. 1 & 2 is a two volume set by free jazz musician Anthony Braxton. It was recorded January 30 – 31, 1985. The album is less free than most of Braxton's previous work and features jazz standards arranged in the usual jazz-combo style.

== Track listing ==
=== Volume 1 ===
1. "Joy Spring" (Clifford Brown) – 7:33
2. "Spring Is Here" (m. Richard Rodgers w. Lorenz Hart) – 3:53
3. "I Remember You" (m. Victor Schertzinger w. Johnny Mercer) – 5:22
4. "Toy" (Clifford Jordan) – 6:33
5. "You Go to My Head" (m. J. Fred Coots w. Haven Gillespie) – 9:35
6. "Old Folks" (m. Willard Robison w. Dedette Lee Hill) – 7:10
7. "Background Music" (Warne Marsh)– 5:34

=== Volume 2 ===
1. "Moment's Notice" (John Coltrane) – 8:33
2. "Ruby, My Dear" (Thelonious Monk) – 5:11
3. "Groovin' High" (Dizzy Gillespie) – 6:40
4. "Yardbird Suite" (Charlie Parker) – 4:31
5. "Nica's Dream" (Horace Silver) – 4:19
6. "Milestones" (Miles Davis) – 4:35
7. "Trinkle Tinkle" (Thelonious Monk) – 6:20

== Personnel ==
- Anthony Braxton – saxophones
- Rufus Reid – bass
- Victor Lewis – drums
- Hank Jones – piano
- Michael Cuscuna – producer
- Steve Backer – executive producer
