= Digital Duke =

Studio album by Mercer Ellington
- Released: 1987
- Studios: Clinton Recording Studio, New York City
- Genres: Jazz, big band, swing
- Length: 68:13
- Label: GRP
- Producers: Dave Grusin, Larry Rosen, Michael Abene, Mercer Ellington

Mercer Ellington chronology
Hot and Bothered (1984)	Digital Duke (1987)	Music Is My Mistress (1989)

Digital Duke is an album by Mercer Ellington and the Duke Ellington Orchestra that won the Grammy Award for Best Large Jazz Ensemble Album in 1988.

== Track listing ==
No.	Title	Writer(s)	Length
1.	"Satin Doll"	Ellington/Johnny Mercer/Billy Strayhorn	4:26
2.	"Cotton Tail"	Ellington	4:14
3.	"Prelude to a Kiss"	Ellington/Irving Mills/Irving Gordon	4:24
4.	"Perdido"	Ervin Drake/Juan Tizol/Hans Lengsfelder	7:00
5.	"Mood Indigo"	Ellington/Mills/Barney Bigard	7:26
6.	"22 Cent Stomp"	Ellington	6:56
7.	"Do Nothing till You Hear from Me"	Ellington/Bob Russell	3:25
8.	"Jeep's Blues"	Ellington/Johnny Hodges	6:19
9.	"In My Solitude"	Ellington/Mills/Eddie DeLange	5:34
10.	"In a Mellow Tone"	Ellington/Milt Gabler	7:13
11.	"Sophisticated Lady"	Ellington/Mills/Mitchell Parish	4:12
12.	"Take the "A" Train"	Strayhorn	5:36

== Personnel ==
- Mercer Ellington – conductor
- Clark Terry – flugelhorn, trumpet
- Lew Soloff – flugelhorn, trumpet
- Barry Hall – flugelhorn, trumpet
- Ron Tooley – flugelhorn, trumpet
- Kamau Adilifu – flugelhorn, trumpet
- Al Grey – trombone
- Britt Woodman – trombone
- Chuck Connors – bass trombone
- Eddie Daniels – clarinet, tenor sax
- Herman Riley – clarinet, tenor sax
- Charles Owens – clarinet, bass clarinet, baritone sax
- Norris Turney – alto sax
- Branford Marsalis – tenor sax
- Roland Hanna – piano
- Gerald Wiggins – piano
- Bucky Pizzarelli – guitar
- J. J. Wiggins – bass
- Louie Bellson – drums
- Ricky White – drums

Production

- Dave Grusin – executive producer
- Larry Rosen – executive producer
- Mercer Ellington – producer
- Michael Abene – producer
- Ed Rak – engineer
- Rebecca Everett – assistant engineer
- Josiah Gluck – digital mixing, editing
- Ted Jensen – digital mastering
- Leonard Feather – liner notes
