= Discovered Again! =

Studio album by Dave Grusin
- Released: 1976
- Recorded: June 1–3, 1976
- Studio: Producers Workshop and The Mastering Lab (Hollywood, California)
- Genre: Jazz
- Length: 31:58
- Label: Sheffield Lab; LAB-5
- Producer: Doug Sax; Lincoln Mayorga

Dave Grusin chronology
The Yakuza (1975)	Discovered Again! (1976)	One of a Kind (1977)

Professional ratings
Review scores
Source	Rating
Allmusic	4/5 stars

Discovered Again! is an album by American pianist Dave Grusin released in 1976, recorded for the Sheffield Lab label. It was originally a "direct to disc" recording. It was remastered and reissued on CD in Japan as Discovered Again! Plus with four bonus tracks. On the original vinyl, "Captain Bacardi" is misspelled as "Captain Bicardi".

== Track listing ==
1. "A Child Is Born" (Thad Jones) - 3:46
2. "Keep Your Eye on the Sparrow" [Theme From "Baretta"] (Grusin, Morgan Ames) - 4:19
3. "Sun Song" (Grusin) - 4:40
4. "Captain Bacardi" (Antonio Carlos Jobim) - 2:36
5. "Three Cowboy Songs": "Git Along Little Dogies"/"The Colorado Trail"/"Cripple Creek Break-Down" (arranged by Grusin) - 14:16
6. "Adeus a Papai" (Grusin) - 2:21

Bonus tracks on CD reissue:

7. "Keep Your Eye on the Sparrow" [Alternative Take] - 4:20
8. "Sun Song" [Alternative Take] - 4:43
9. "3 Cowboy Songs: No. 1. Git Along Little Dogies" [Alternative Take] - 4:30
10. "3 Cowboy Songs: No. 2. The Colorado Trail" [Alternative Take] - 5:14

== Personnel ==
- Dave Grusin – acoustic piano, Rhodes piano, arrangements
- Lee Ritenour – guitars
- Ron Carter – bass
- Harvey Mason – drums
- Larry Bunker – vibraphone, percussion

Production

- Lincoln Mayorga – producer
- Doug Sax – producer
- Bill Schnee – recording engineer
- David Coe – assistant engineer
- Toby Foster – assistant engineer
- Steve Haselton – assistant engineer
- Paul Kaminsky – assistant engineer
- Sherwood Sax – design engineer
- Bud Wyatt – design engineer
- Richard Doss – disc processing
- Mike Reese – lathe operator
- John Schubach – pressings
- Jeff Weber – production assistant
- Joseph Estren – music preparation
- Morgan Ames – music notes
- Keith Albright – piano tuning
- Christina Farley – album design, photography
