= The Colorado Trail (song) =

American cowboy song

The Colorado Trail (Roud 6695) is a traditional American cowboy song, collected and published in 1927 by Carl Sandburg in his American Songbag. Sandburg says that he learned the song from Dr. T. L. Chapman, of Duluth, Minnesota, who heard it from a badly injured cowboy being treated in his hospital. The cowboy sang it, and many others, to an audience of patients in his ward.

The trail in the song was a cattle route that branched off from the main Western Trail in southern Oklahoma, heading northwest to Colorado. It has no relation to today's Colorado Trail, which is a hiking trail completely within the state of Colorado.

The song got its widest attention from its 1960 recording by The Kingston Trio. It has also been recorded by Burl Ives, The Weavers, The Norman Luboff Choir, Tex Ritter, Johnny Cash, the Bar D Wranglers, and many others. The American Songbag version included only a single short verse; most who have recorded it since have added verses of their own.

Members of the Western Writers of America chose it as one of the Top 100 Western songs of all time.
