= Rumba Palace =

Studio album by Arturo Sandoval

Rumba Palace is an album by Arturo Sandoval, released in 2007. In the United States, the album reached a peak position of number 20 on Billboard's Top Jazz Albums charts.

== Track listing ==
1. "A Gozar" - 4:08
2. "Guarachando" - 6:01
3. "El Huracán Del Caribe" - 5:21
4. "21st Century" - 7:10
5. "Sexy Lady" - 5:09
6. "Peaceful" - 3:44
7. "Having Fun" - 6:18
8. "Arranca De Nuevo" - 5:26
9. "Rumba Palace" - 5:53
10. "Nouveau Cha Cha" - 4:53
