= I Remember Clifford (album) =

Studio album by Arturo Sandoval
- Released: March 1992
- Studio: Sound on Sound (New York City, New York)
- Genre: Be-bop jazz
- Length: 61:51
- Label: GRP
- Producer: Rudy Pérez: Carl Griffin; Orlando "Papito" Hernández; Arturo Sandoval

Arturo Sandoval chronology
Flight to Freedom (1991)	I Remember Clifford (1992)	Dream Come True (1993)

Professional ratings
Review scores
Source	Rating
AllMusic	4.5/5 stars
DownBeat	4.5/5 stars
The Penguin Guide to Jazz	3/4 stars
Vox	8/10 stars

I Remember Clifford is a 1992 album by Arturo Sandoval, the second album he made after leaving his native Cuba.

The entire album is a tribute to Clifford Brown, who was a great influence on Sandoval and who died in an auto accident in 1956, when he was 25 years old.

== Title ==
The album is named for Clifford Brown, who was killed on June 26, 1956, in a car accident which also killed pianist Richie Powell, and Powell's wife.

Sandoval's written tribute to Brown in the liner notes for the album ends:

Everybody that I've spoken to, who knew Brownie, coincided in describing his heart and his simplicity as an artist. Modesty, feelings, dignity and virtuosity; not a bad legacy. ... It is with all my heart and soul that I offer this sincere effort to one of the greatest trumpet players of all time; a man who left his mark as a person and as an artist.

The album is named after the composition "I Remember Clifford", a threnody by Benny Golson, which was also written in memory of Brown.

In addition to a rendition of the Golson piece (using only a trumpet and piano - a tribute to the two musicians who died together), the album contains a long list of Brown's best-known standards (some composed by Brown himself). One final inclusion is a new composition, "I Left This Space for You", written by Sandoval in tribute, in which Sandoval plays only a restrained melody.

One very unusual feature, heard on five of the tracks, is the use of overdubbing to create a trumpet 'choir' of four harmonized trumpets, all played by Sandoval (a concept credited to Orlando "Papito" Hernández, who had experience with multiple trumpets from his time playing with Herb Alpert). The 'choir' is used to play arrangements of some of Brown's own solos; the different trumpet lines are closely synchronized. Sandoval's own playing features in his own solos, especially on "Cherokee", which he takes at a faster pace than Brown's own rapid original.

The album received two nominations in the 1992 Grammy Awards ('Best Jazz Instrumental Performance - Individual or Group', and 'Best Arrangement on an Instrumental', for "Cherokee"). It was picked by critic Leonard Feather as one of the ten best jazz albums of 1992.

== Track listing ==
1. "Daahoud" (Brown) - 4:57
2. "Joy Spring" (Brown) - 5:42
3. "Parisian Thoroughfare" (Bud Powell) - 5:57
4. "Cherokee" (Ray Noble) - 5:07
5. "I Remember Clifford" (Benny Golson) - 4:11
6. "The Blues Walk" (Brown) - 6:45
7. "Sandu" (Brown) - 5:17
8. "I Get a Kick Out of You" (Cole Porter) - 5:11
9. "Jordu" (Duke Jordan) - 8:25
10. "Caravan" (Ellington, Mills, Tizol) - 4:26
11. "I Left This Space for You" (Sandoval) - 5:53

== Personnel ==
=== Performers ===
- Arturo Sandoval – trumpet, flugelhorn, arrangements (5, 11)
- Kenny Kirkland – acoustic piano
- Félix Gómez – keyboards (5)
- Charnett Moffett – bass
- Kenny Washington – drums
- Ernie Watts – tenor saxophone (1, 4, 7, 9, 10)
- Ed Calle – tenor saxophone (2)
- David Sánchez – tenor saxophone (3, 6, 8)
- Gary Lindsay – arrangements (1–4, 6–8, 10)
- Alberto Naranjo – arrangements (9)

=== Production ===
- Dave Grusin – executive producer
- Larry Rosen – executive producer
- Rudy Peréz – producer, recording, digital mixing
- Carl Griffin – producer (1–4, 6–10)
- Orlando "Papito" Hernández – producer (1–4, 6–10)
- Arturo Sandoval – producer (5, 11), liner notes
- Peter Beckerman – assistant engineer
- Andy Roshberg – assistant engineer
- Charles Dye – mix assistant
- Michael Bloom – liner notes coordination
- Joseph Doughney – post-production
- Michael Landy – post-production
- Adam Zelinka – post-production
- The Review Room (New York, NY) – post-production location
- Ted Jensen – mastering at Sterling Sound (New York, NY)
- Michael Pollard – production coordinator
- Doreen Kalcich – production coordinating assistant
- Bo Post – album coordinator
- Andy Baltimore – creative director
- David Gibb – graphic design
- Scott Johnson – graphic design
- Sonny Mediana – graphic design
- Andy Ruggirello – graphic design
- Dan Serrano – graphic design
- Emil Bogan – graphic design assistant
- Carol Weinberg – photography
- Chuck Stewart – black & white photography
- Michael Bloom – liner notes coordination
- Neil Tesser – liner notes
