= Arturo Sandoval =

Cuban-American jazz trumpeter, pianist and composer (born 1949)

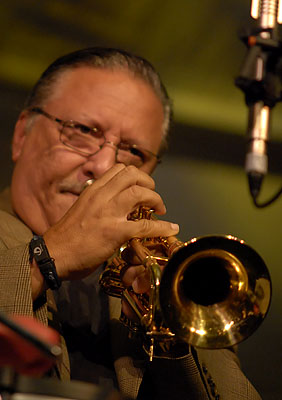
- Sandoval performing in 2008

Background information
- Born: 6 November 1949 (age 76); Artemisa, Cuba
- Genres: Jazz; Latin jazz; Afro-Cuban
- Occupation: Musician
- Instruments: Trumpet; piano; timbales
- Years active: 1962–present
- Spouse: Carmen Marianela Sandoval (m. 1975)
- Website: arturosandoval.com

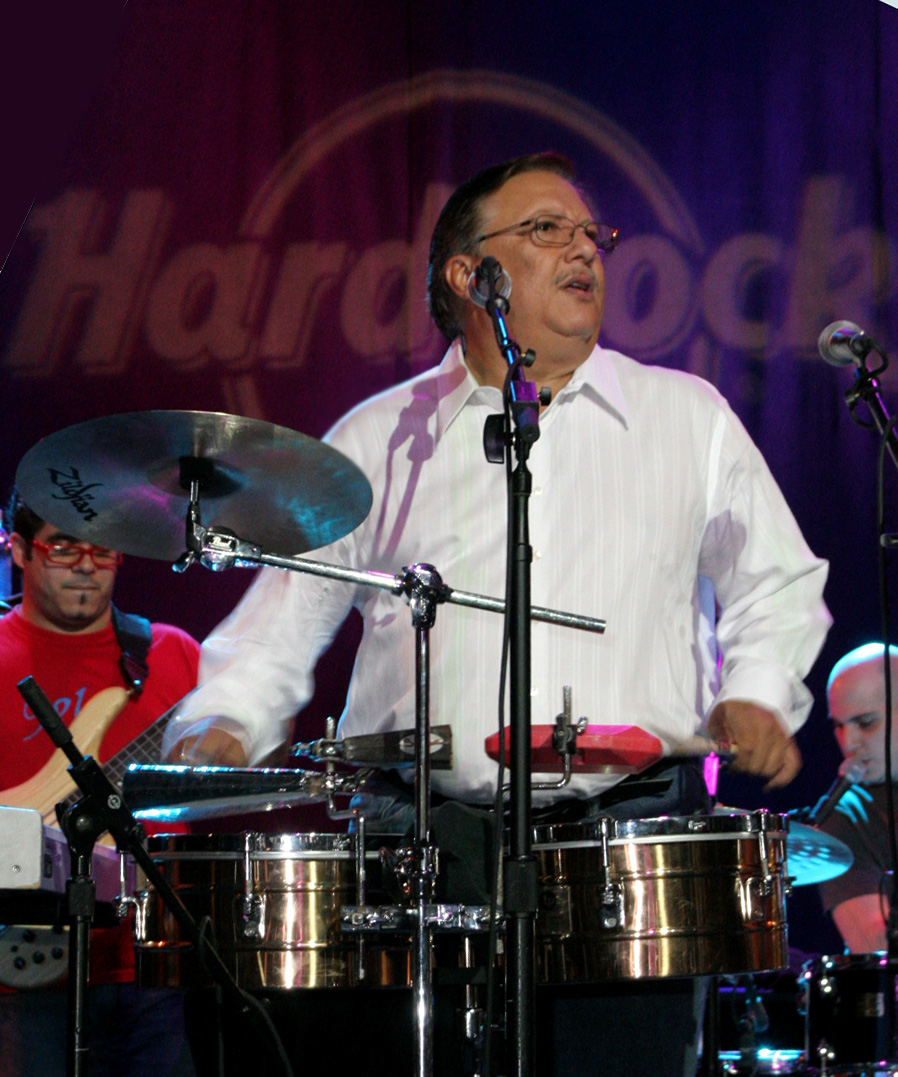
Sandoval playing the timbales

Arturo Sandoval (born November 6, 1949) is a Cuban-American jazz trumpeter, pianist, timbalero, and composer. While living in his native Cuba, Sandoval was influenced by jazz musicians Charlie Parker, Clifford Brown, and Dizzy Gillespie. In 1977 he met Gillespie, who became his friend and mentor and helped him defect from Cuba while on tour with the United Nations Orchestra. Sandoval became an American naturalized citizen in 1998. His life was the subject of the film For Love or Country: The Arturo Sandoval Story (2000) starring Andy García.

Sandoval, a 2024 Kennedy Center Honors recipient, has won four Grammy Awards from 11 nominations, Billboard Awards and one Emmy Award. He has performed at the White House and at the Super Bowl (1995).

== Life and career ==
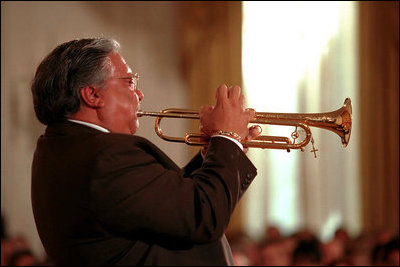
Sandoval in the East Room of the White House, celebrating Hispanic Heritage Month

Sandoval was born into a poor family in Artemisa, a small village in the province of Havana, Cuba. He started playing music at age 13 in the village band, learning the basics of music theory and percussion. After playing many instruments, he finally settled on the trumpet, playing with street musicians. In 1964, Sandoval enrolled at the Cuban National School of Arts where he took classical trumpet lessons for three years, and earned a place in the country's all-star national band. He helped establish the Orquesta Cubana de Música Moderna, which became the band Irakere in 1973. He toured worldwide with his own group in 1981. During the following year he toured with Dizzy Gillespie, who became his friend and mentor. From 1982 to 1984, he was voted Cuba's Best Instrumentalist and was a guest artist at the BBC and Leningrad Symphony Orchestras.

In 1989, Gillespie invited Sandoval to be part of the United Nations Orchestra. During a tour with this group, Sandoval visited the American Embassy in Athens, Greece, accompanied by Gillespie, who helped him with his plan to defect from Cuba. Sandoval became an American citizen on December 7, 1998.

Sandoval has performed Latin jazz with Paquito D'Rivera, Tito Puente, and Chico O'Farrill, Cuban music in Miami, and classical music in England and Germany. In the 1990s, he was a member of the GRP All-Star Big Band.

In 2014, Sandoval performed at Eastman Theatre with Zane Musa, Dave Siegel, Teymur Phel, Johnny Friday, and Armando Arce.

He has taught at Florida International University and Whitworth University, where he is in charge of its jazz ensemble. He has performed with the Los Angeles Philharmonic, Pittsburgh Symphony and National Symphony Orchestras. In 1996, Sandoval was commissioned by the Kennedy Center Ballet to score Pepito's Story, a ballet based on the book by Eugene Fern and choreographed by Debbie Allen. Sandoval also composed a classical trumpet concerto that he performed and recorded with the London Symphony Orchestra.

== Awards and honors ==
Sandoval's score for a film about his life won an Emmy Award. His compositions and performances can be heard on The Mambo Kings, which was nominated for a Grammy Award in 1992 for Best Instrumental Composition Written for a Motion Picture or for Television.

His song "A Mis Abuelos" (To My Grandparents) received Grammy Award nominations for Best Instrumental Composition and Best Arrangement. This composition appeared on his Grammy-winning album Danzon.

On November 20, 2013, President Barack Obama presented Sandoval with the Presidential Medal of Freedom.

Sandoval was a 2024 recipient of the Kennedy Center Honors.

== Other work ==
In 2015, Arturo Sandoval joined the 14th annual Independent Music Awards judging panel to assist independent musicians' careers. He was also a judge for the 10th, 12th and 13th Independent Music Awards.

Sandoval played the trumpet solo in a 2018 music video of the Leonid and Friends cover of Chicago's "Street Player".

== Discography ==
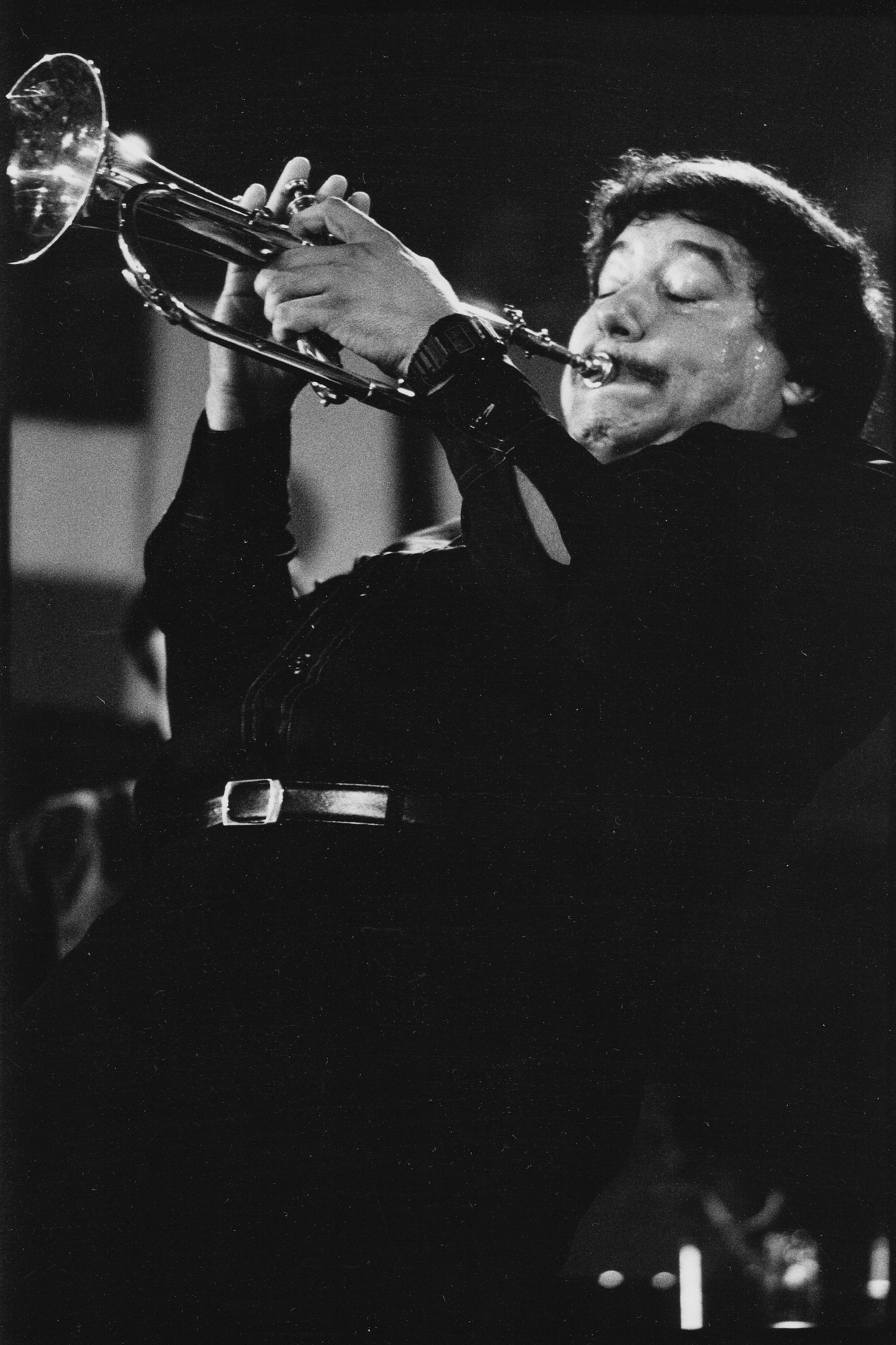
Sandoval at the 1984 International Jazz Festival in Prague

=== As leader ===
- Turi (Areito, 1981)
- Arturo Sandoval y Su Grupo (Areito, 1982)
- To a Finland Station with Dizzy Gillespie (Pablo, 1982)
- Breaking the Sound Barrier (Chicago Caribbean, 1983)
- Tumbaito (Messidor, 1986)
- No Problem (Jazz House, 1987)
- Straight Ahead (Jazz House, 1988)
- Plays for the Pandas (Cocoral, 1988)
- Just Music (Jazz House, 1989)
- Arturo Sandoval (Areito, 1991)
- Flight to Freedom (GRP, 1991)
- I Remember Clifford (GRP, 1992)
- Dream Come True (GRP, 1993)
- Danzón (GRP, 1994)
- The Classical Album (RCA Victor, 1994)
- Arturo Sandoval & the Latin Train (GRP, 1995)
- Swingin' (GRP, 1996)
- Hot House (N-Coded, 1998)
- Americana (N-Coded, 1999)
- Los Elefantes with Wynton Marsalis (In-akustik, 1999)
- For Love or Country: The Arturo Sandoval Story (Atlantic, 2000)
- Jam Miami (Concord, 2000)
- Ronnie Scott's Jazz House (DCC, 2000)
- L. A. Meetings (CuBop, 2001)
- My Passion for the Piano (Columbia, 2002)
- Trumpet Evolution (Columbia, 2003)
- Live at the Blue Note (Half Note, 2005)
- Rumba Palace (Telarc, 2007)
- Mambo Nights (2009)
- A Time for Love (Concord Jazz, 2010)
- Dear Diz (Every Day I Think of You) (Concord Jazz, 2012)
- At Middleton (Perseverance, 2014)
- Live at Yoshi's (Alfi, 2015)
- Ultimate Duets (Universal, 2018)
- Christmas at Notre Dame (2018)
- Rhythm & Soul (MetaJAX, 2022)

=== As sideman ===
With Willy Chirino

- Oxigeno (Sony, 1991)
- South Beach (Sony, 1993)
- Cuba Libre (Sony, 1998)

With Ed Calle

- DoubleTalk (Columbia, 1996)
- Sunset Harbor (Concord 1999)
- Twilight (Concord, 2001)
- 360 (Mojito, 2016)

With the GRP All-Star Big Band

- GRP All-Star Big Band (GRP, 1992)
- Dave Grusin Presents GRP All-Star Big Band Live! (GRP, 1993)
- All Blues (GRP, 1995)

With Dave Grusin

- Havana (GRP, 1990)
- The Orchestral Album (GRP, 1994)
- Random Hearts (Sony, 1999)
- An Evening with Dave Grusin (Heads Up, 2011)

With Irakere

- 3 1/2 (BASF, 1976)
- Chekere Cuba (Love 1977)
- Irakere (Areito, 1978)
- Chekere Son (JVC, 1979)
- 2 (Columbia, 1979)
- Cuba Libre (JVC, 1980)
- Live in Sweden (A Disc, 1981)
- El Coco (JVC, 1982)

With others

- Albita, Dicen Que... (Epic, 1996)
- David Amram, Havana/New York (Flying Fish, 1978)
- Paul Anka, Amigos (Columbia, 1996)
- Paul Anka, A Body of Work (Epic, 1998)
- Ricardo Arjona, Galeria Caribe (Epic, 2000)
- Luis Eduardo Aute, 20 Canciones De Amor y Un Poema Desesperado (Ariola, 1986)
- Regina Belle, Passion (Columbia, 1992)
- Eric Benet, Eric Benet (BMG, 2016)
- Tony Bennett, Duets II (Columbia, 2011)
- Canadian Brass, Noel (RCA Victor, 1994)
- Vikki Carr, Memories, Memorias (Universal, 1999)
- Dr. John, Ske-Dat-De-Dat (Concord, 2014)
- Paquito D'Rivera, Reunion (L'Escalier 1991)
- Candy Dulfer, What Does It Take (N-Coded, 1999)
- Gloria Estefan, Into the Light (Epic, 1991)
- Gloria Estefan, Mi Tierra (Epic, 1993)
- Kurt Elling, Passion World (Concord Jazz, 2015)
- Pete Escovedo, Live from Stern Grove (Concord Jazz, 2013)
- Alejandro Fernandez, Confidencias (Universal, 2013)
- Kenny G, At Last... the Duets Album (Arista, 2004)
- David Garrett, Music (Decca, 2012)
- Lucho Gatica, Historia De Un Amor (Universal, 2013)
- Dizzy Gillespie, Gillespie en Vivo (Areito, 1985)
- Dizzy Gillespie, Live at the Royal Festival Hall (Enja, 1990)
- Josh Groban, All That Echoes (Reprise, 2013)
- Ruben Gonzalez, Suena El Piano Ruben Grandes Solos (Egrem, 2009)
- Gordon Goodwin, Swingin' for the Fences (Silverline, 2000)
- George Gruntz, Sins'n Wins'n Funs (TCB, 1996)
- Henri Guedon, Afro Temple (Le Chant Du Monde, 1984)
- David Hickman, Trumpet Fiesta (Summit, 2011)
- Alicia Keys, The Diary of Alicia Keys (J 2004)
- Michel Legrand, Michel Plays Legrand (LaserLight, 1994)
- Beenie Man, Art and Life (Virgin, 2000)
- Junior Mance, ManceSolid, (Chiaroscuro, 2018)
- Martika, Martika's Kitchen (Columbia, 1991)
- Ricky Martin, Sound Loaded (Columbia, 2000)
- Johnny Mathis, How Do You Keep the Music Playing? (Columbia, 1993)
- Luis Miguel, Mis Romances (WEA, 2001)
- T. S. Monk, Monk On Monk (N2K Encoded, 1997)
- James Moody, Moody's Party (Telarc, 1995)
- Azucar Moreno, Esclava de tu Piel (Epic, 1996)
- Azucar Moreno, Ole (Epic, 1998)
- Mouskouri, Nana Latina (Mercury, 1996)
- Alphonse Mouzon, Angel Face (Tenacious, 2011)
- Billie Myers, Growing Pains (Universal, 1997)
- Chico O'Farrill, Heart of a Legend (Milestone, 1999)
- Ole Ole, Al Descubierto (Hispavox, 1992)
- Johnny Pacheco, Entre Amigos (Bronco, 2005)
- Jorge Luis Prats, Toot Suite (Areito, 1986)
- The Rippingtons, Black Diamond (Windham Hill/Peak, 1997)
- Danny Rivera, Tiempo Al Tiempo (Columbia, 1992)
- Lourdes Robles, Amaneciendo En Ti (Sony, 1993)
- Alejandro Sanz, Sirope (Universal, 2015)
- Alfredo Sadel, Alfredo Sadel En Cuba (BASF, 1978)
- Poncho Sanchez, Psychedelic Blues (Concord, 2009)
- Gilberto Santa Rosa, A Dos Tiempos De Un Tiempo (Sony, 1992)
- Jimmy Scott, I Go Back Home (Eden River, 2016)
- Jon Secada, Si Te Vas (SBK, 1994)
- Jon Secada, Secada (SBK, 1997)
- Alan Silvestri, Clean Slate (Perez Family Music Box 2013)
- Frank Sinatra, Duets (Capitol, 2013)
- Rod Stewart, As Time Goes By (J/BMG, 2003)
- Rod Stewart, It Had to Be You (J/BMG, 2002)
- Billy Taylor, Taylor Made at the Kennedy Center (Kennedy Center, 2005)
- Diego Torres, Tal Cual Es (BMG, 1999)
- Juan Pablo Torres, Pepper Trombone (RMM/TropiJazz, 1997)
- Juan Pablo Torres, Together Again (Pimenta 2002)
- Dave Valentin, Red Sun (GRP, 1993)
- Chris Walden, Full-On! (Origin, 2014)
- Ernie Watts, Reaching Up (JVC, 1994)
- Randy Waldman, Wigged Out (Whirlybird, 1998)
- Randy Waldman, Super Heroes (BFM, 2018)
- Arturo Sandoval and Kiwzo Fumero, Baby Grand, (CD Baby, 2022)
- Yanni, Yanni & Arturo, Truth of Touch (Yanni/Wake, 2011)

== Filmography ==
- 1985: Vampiros en La Habana
- 1987: A Night in Havana: Dizzy Gillespie in Cuba
- 1990: Dizzy Gillespie and the United Nations Orchestra
- 1993: GRP All-Star Big Band Live
- 1995: Lava Lava!
- 1996: Mr. Wrong
- 1996: The Perez Family
- 2000: For Love or Country: The Arturo Sandoval Story
- 2000: Knockout
- 2001: 61*
- 2010: Sacred Waters
- 2011: Oscar's Cuba
- 2013: 1000 to 1
- 2013: Antebellum
- 2013: At Middleton
- 2013: Christmas in Conway
- 2013: The Resurrection of Malchus
- 2013: Tightwire
- 2015: Underdog Kids
- 2018: The Mule
- 2019: Richard Jewell
