= Ed Calle =

Venezuelan jazz saxophonist and composer

- Born: Eduardo J. Calle; Caracas, Venezuela
- Genre: Jazz
- Occupations: Musician; composer
- Instruments: Saxophone; clarinet; flute; EWI

Eduardo J. Calle (/ˈkɑːjeɪ/ KAH-yeh; born in Caracas, Venezuela) is a jazz saxophonist from Miami, Florida. He also plays the flute, clarinet, electronic wind instrument (EWI), and keyboards, sings. In addition, he composes and arranges music and works as a recording engineer. Calle has served as Chairperson of Arts & Philosophy at Miami Dade College North Campus and is currently the Tenured Full Professor of Music Business and Production there.

During his career, he was three times nominated for the Latin Grammy Award. First in 2005 for Ed Calle Plays Santana, in 2007 for In the Zone, and in 2014 for Palo! Live, which was also nominated in 2015 for a Grammy Award.

Calle has participated in a number of recording projects, including Tita Vivar's Tiempos De Regocijo (2022), Héctor Alejandro Cid Pérez's El Glorioso Evangelio: Celebrando 10 Años De Ministerio (2021), feature on the song "Gracias Señor".

== Political controversy ==
In January 2017, Calle posted on Twitter calling to impeach President Barack Obama and referring to him as "The Kenyan". Aligning himself with the Birther Movement, Calle later said in a statement titled "Response to Twitter Mob" he later issued on his personal site, "that America impeach someone whose posted birth certificate has been carefully analyzed and determined a forgery by at least two independent experts".

== Discography ==
=== As leader ===
- Dr. Ed Calle Presents Mamblue (Mojito, 2015)
- In the Zone (Mojito, 2006)
- Ed Calle Plays Santana, (Pimienta, 2004)
- Twilight (Concord, 2001)
- Sunset Harbor (Concord, 1999)
- Double Talk (Columbia, 1995)
