= List of Focus members =

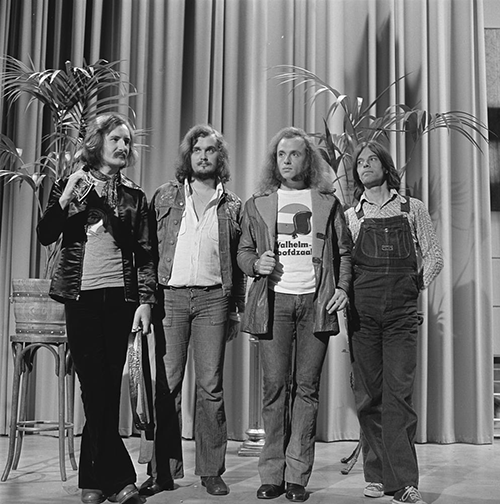
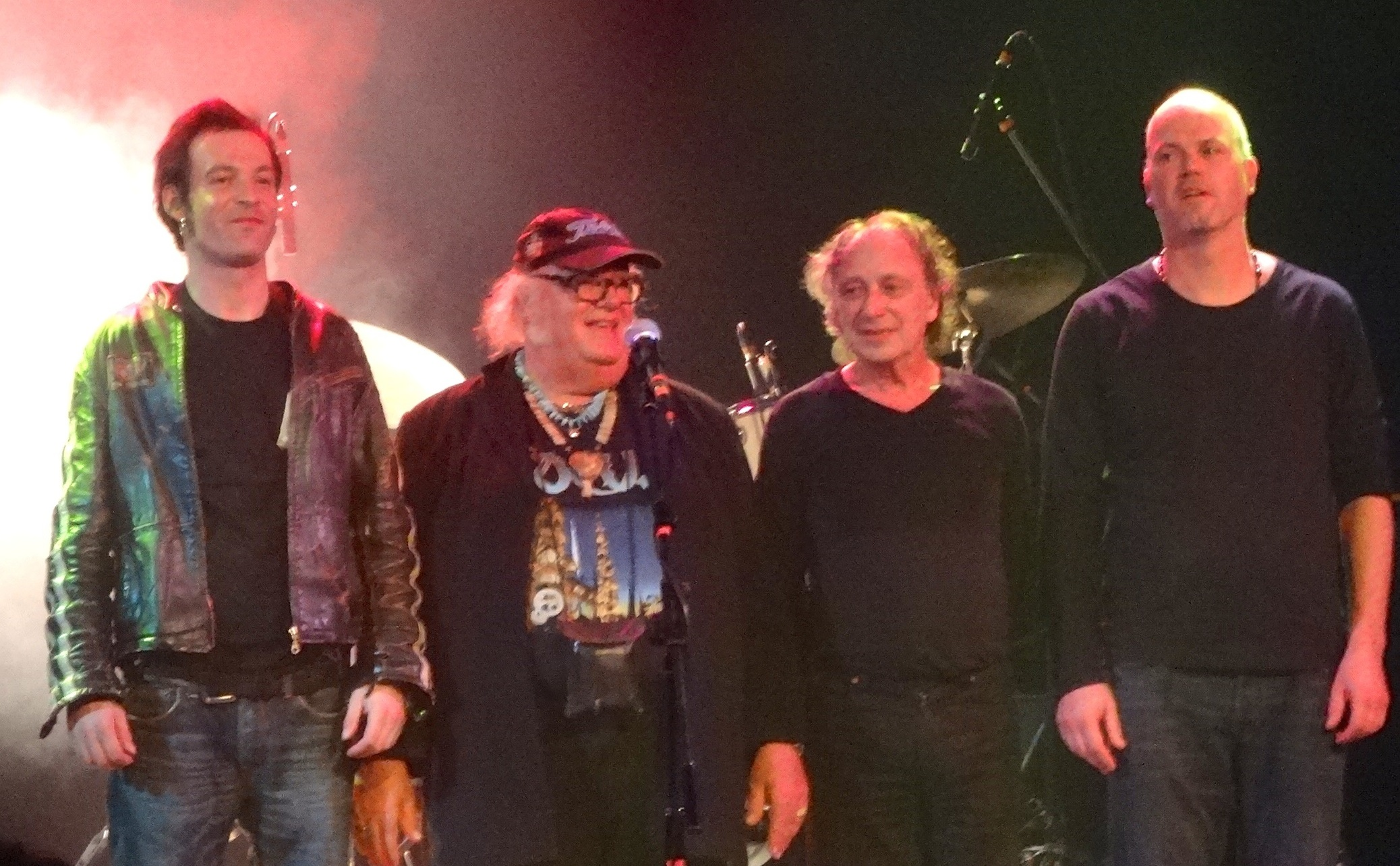
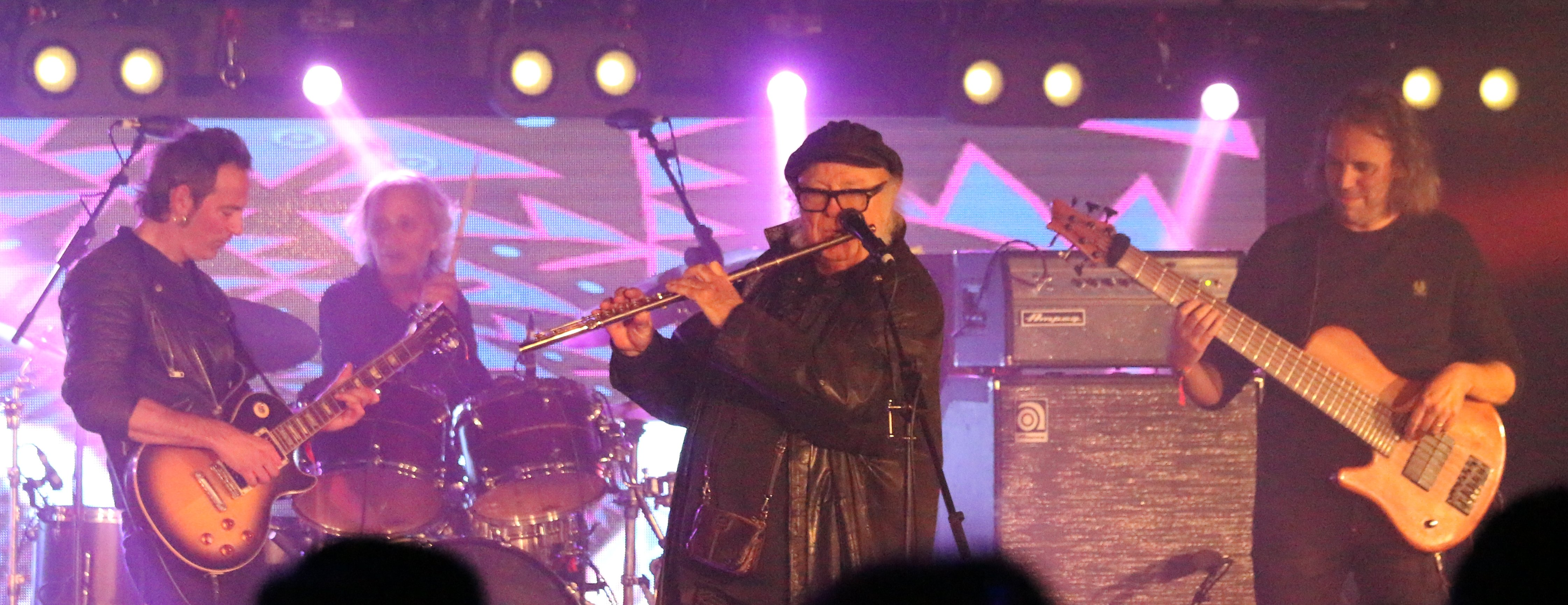
Three lineups of Focus in 1974, 2014, 2023

Focus are a Dutch progressive rock band from Amsterdam. Formed in November 1969, the group originally included keyboardist, flautist and vocalist Thijs van Leer, guitarist Jan Akkerman, bassist Martijn Dresden and drummer Hans Cleuver. The group broke up in 1978, but later reformed with various personnel changes in 1985, 1997 and finally 2002. The current lineup includes van Leer, drummer Pierre van der Linden (originally a member from 1971 to 1973, again from 1975 to 1976, and most recently since 2004), guitarist Menno Gootjes (originally from 1997 to 1998, and since 2010), and bassist Udo Pannekeet (since 2016).

== History ==
=== 1969–1978 ===
Thijs van Leer, Jan Akkerman, Martijn Dresden and Hans Cleuver originally formed Focus in November 1969. Shortly after the release of the band's debut album Focus Plays Focus, Dresden and Cleuver were replaced by Cyril Havermans and Pierre van der Linden, respectively, both of whom had previously worked with Akkerman as members of Brainbox. The new members debuted on the follow-up Focus II, before Havermans was replaced by Bert Ruiter in September 1971. The lineup remained stable for Focus 3, before van der Linden left in October 1973 due to musical differences with van Leer and Akkerman. He was replaced by Colin Allen, and Focus released their fourth album Hamburger Concerto in 1974. Allen was later fired after recording just one track for the follow-up album.

Released in 1975, Mother Focus featured drums recorded by session musician David Kemper. van der Linden subsequently returned, although by early 1976 he had departed again and Kemper had taken his place on tour. The tour in question also featured new guitarist Philip Catherine, who joined on short notice after Akkerman suddenly left in February due to increasing tensions with van Leer. By mid-1977, the group's lineup had changed drastically – P. J. Proby took over lead vocal duties, Eef Albers joined as a second guitarist, and Steve Smith replaced Kemper on drums. Focus con Proby was released in 1978; the band never performed live with Proby, returning to tour the following year with new drummer Richard James. After the tour concluded in August 1978, the group disbanded.

=== 1985 onwards ===
In 1984, van Leer and Akkerman reunited for a set of recordings under their own names, which were released the following March as Focus. The newly reformed group was intended to tour in promotion of the release, but disbanded again shortly after the album's release due to continued tensions between the two. Five years later, the pair reunited with former members Bert Ruiter and Pierre van der Linden for a performance of new and old material on a television special in the Netherlands, although it did not evolve into a full reformation. van Leer and Akkerman subsequently performed together again at the North Sea Jazz Festival in 1993, before van Leer attempted another short-lived Focus reformation with Ruiter, original drummer Hans Cleuver and new guitarist Menno Gootjes in 1997.

=== 2002 onwards ===
In early 2002, Thijs van Leer reformed Focus again with new guitarist Jan Dumée, bassist Bobby Jacobs and drummer Ruben van Roon. Bert Smaak replaced van Roon shortly after the reformation to complete work on the comeback album Focus 8, and remained until August 2004 when van der Linden returned to the band. Dumée was replaced by Niels van der Steenhoven in time for Focus 9 / New Skin in 2006, before Gootjes returned for a second stint in 2010. After the band released Focus X and Golden Oldies, Udo Pannekeet replaced long-time bassist Jacobs in December 2016. The Focus Family Album and Focus 11 followed in 2017 and 2018, respectively.

Former bassist Bert Ruiter died on 24 March 2022, aged 75.

== Members ==
=== Current ===
Image	Name	Years active	Instruments	Release contributions
	Thijs van Leer	1969–1978; 1985; 1990; 1997–1998; 2001–present	keyboards; synthesisers; piano; flute; vocals	all Focus releases
	Pierre van der Linden	1971–1973; 1975–1976; 1990; 2004–present	drums; percussion	Focus II (1971); Focus 3 (1972); At the Rainbow (1973); Ship of Memories (1976); Masters from the Vault (2002); all Focus releases from Focus 9 / New Skin (2006) onwards
	Menno Gootjes	1997–1998; 2010–present	guitar	Focus X (2012); Golden Oldies (2014); The Focus Family Album (2017); Focus 11 (2018)
	Udo Pannekeet	2016–present	bass	The Focus Family Album (2017); Focus 11 (2018)

=== Former ===
Image	Name	Years active	Instruments	Release contributions
	Jan Akkerman	1969–1976; 1985; 1990	guitar; lute; occasional bass and percussion	all Focus releases from Focus Plays Focus (1970) to Ship of Memories (1976); Masters from the Vault (2002)
	Hans Cleuver	1969–1970; 1997–1998	drums; percussion; backing vocals	Focus Plays Focus (1970); Ship of Memories (1976) – one track only
	Martijn Dresden	1969–1970	bass; backing vocals	Focus Plays Focus (1970); Ship of Memories (1976) – one track only
	Cyril Havermans	1971	bass; backing vocals	Focus II (1971); Masters from the Vault (2002)
	Bert Ruiter	1971–1978; 1990; 1997–1998; (died 2022)	bass; backing vocals	all Focus releases from Focus 3 (1972) to Focus con Proby (1978); Live at the BBC (2004)
	Colin Allen	1973–1975	drums; percussion	Hamburger Concerto (1974); Mother Focus (1975) – one track only
	David Kemper	1975 (session); 1976	drums; percussion	Mother Focus (1975); Ship of Memories (1976) – two tracks only; Live at the BBC (2004)
	Philip Catherine	1976–1977	guitar	Focus con Proby (1978); Live at the BBC (2004)
	Eef Albers	1977–1978	guitar	Focus con Proby (1978)
	P. J. Proby	1977–1978	vocals	Focus con Proby (1978)
	Steve Smith	1977–1978	drums	Focus con Proby (1978)
	Richard James	1977–1978	drums	none – live performances only
	Bobby Jacobs	2001–2016	bass; backing vocals	Focus 8 (2002); Live in America (2003); all Focus releases from Focus 9/New Skin (2006) to The Focus Family Album (2017)
	Jan Dumée	2001–2006	guitar; backing vocals	Focus 8 (2002); Live in America (2003)
	Ruben van Roon	2001–2002	drums	none – live performances only
	Bert Smaak	2002–2003	drums	Focus 8 (2002); Live in America (2003)
	Niels van der Steenhoven	2006–2010	guitar	Focus 9/New Skin (2006); Live in Europe (2009); Live in England (2016)

== Lineups ==
Period	Members	Releases
November 1969 – November 1970	Thijs van Leer – vocals, keyboards, flute; Jan Akkerman – guitar; Martin Dresden – bass, backing vocals; Hans Cleuver – drums, percussion, backing vocals	Focus Plays Focus (1970); Ship of Memories (1976) – one track only
November 1970 – September 1971	Thijs van Leer – vocals, keyboards, flute; Jan Akkerman – guitar; Cyril Havermans – bass, backing vocals; Pierre van der Linden – drums, percussion	Focus II (1971)
September 1971 – October 1973	Thijs van Leer – vocals, keyboards, flute; Jan Akkerman – guitar; Bert Ruiter – bass, backing vocals; Pierre van der Linden – drums, percussion	Focus 3 (1972); At the Rainbow (1973); Ship of Memories (1976) – remaining tracks
November 1973 – May 1975	Thijs van Leer – vocals, keyboards, flute; Jan Akkerman – guitar; Bert Ruiter – bass, backing vocals; Colin Allen – drums, percussion	Hamburger Concerto (1974); Mother Focus (1975) – one track only
May – June 1975	Thijs van Leer – vocals, keyboards, flute; Jan Akkerman – guitar; Bert Ruiter – bass, backing vocals; David Kemper – drums (session)	Mother Focus (1975) – remaining tracks; Ship of Memories (1976) – two tracks only
June 1975 – February 1976	Thijs van Leer – vocals, keyboards, flute; Jan Akkerman – guitar; Bert Ruiter – bass, backing vocals; Pierre van der Linden – drums	none
March 1976 – June 1977	Thijs van Leer – vocals, keyboards, flute; Philip Catherine – guitar; Bert Ruiter – bass, backing vocals; David Kemper – drums	Live at the BBC (2004)
June – late 1977	P. J. Proby – vocals; Thijs van Leer – keyboards, flute; Eef Albers – guitar; Philip Catherine – guitar; Bert Ruiter – bass, backing vocals; Steve Smith – drums	Focus con Proby (1977)
Late 1977 – August 1978	Thijs van Leer – vocals, keyboards, flute; Eef Albers – guitar; Philip Catherine – guitar; Bert Ruiter – bass, backing vocals; Richard James – drums	none
Band inactive 1978–1985
1985	Thijs van Leer – vocals, keyboards, flute; Jan Akkerman – guitar	none
Band inactive 1985–1990
1990	Thijs van Leer – vocals, keyboards, flute; Jan Akkerman – guitar; Bert Ruiter – bass, backing vocals; Pierre van der Linden – drums	none
Band inactive 1990–1997
1997–1998	Thijs van Leer – vocals, keyboards, flute; Menno Gootjes – guitar; Bert Ruiter – bass, backing vocals; Hans Cleuver – drums	none
Band inactive 1998–2002
February – April 2002	Thijs van Leer – vocals, keyboards, flute; Jan Dumée – guitar, backing vocals; Bobby Jacobs – bass, backing vocals; Ruben van Roon – drums	none
April 2002 – August 2004	Thijs van Leer – vocals, keyboards, flute; Jan Dumée – guitar, backing vocals; Bobby Jacobs – bass, backing vocals; Bert Smaak – drums	Focus 8 (2002); Live in America (2003)
August 2004 – 2006	Thijs van Leer – vocals, keyboards, flute; Jan Dumée – guitar, backing vocals; Bobby Jacobs – bass, backing vocals; Pierre van der Linden – drums, percussion	none
2006–2010	Thijs van Leer – vocals, keyboards, flute; Niels van der Steenhoven – guitar; Bobby Jacobs – bass, backing vocals; Pierre van der Linden – drums, percussion	Focus 9 / New Skin (2006); Live in Europe (2009); Live in England (2016)
2010 – December 2016	Thijs van Leer – vocals, keyboards, flute; Menno Gootjes – guitar; Bobby Jacobs – bass, backing vocals; Pierre van der Linden – drums, percussion	Focus X (2012); Golden Oldies (2014)
December 2016 – present	Thijs van Leer – vocals, keyboards, flute; Menno Gootjes – guitar; Udo Pannekeet – bass; Pierre van der Linden – drums, percussion	Focus 11 (2018); Focus 12 (2024)
