= Focus discography =

- Studio albums: 11
- Live albums: 6
- Compilation albums: 1
- Singles: 8

The discography of the progressive rock band Focus consists of 11 studio albums, one compilation album, six live albums, and eight singles.

== Studio albums ==
Year	Title	NL	AUS	NOR	UK	US	Can	Certifications (sales thresholds)
1970	Focus Plays Focus / In And Out Of Focus	—	—	—	—	104	—	—
1971	Focus II / Moving Waves	4	15	—	2	8	6	US: Gold
1972	Focus 3	1	36	20	6	35	54	US: Gold
1974	Hamburger Concerto	5	14	16	20	66	87	UK: Silver
1975	Mother Focus	—	61	17	23	152	—	—
1976	Ship of Memories (Studio outtakes 1970–1975)	—	—	—	—	163	—	—
1978	Focus con Proby	27	—	—	—	—	—	—
1985	Focus (as Jan Akkerman & Thijs Van Leer)	33	—	—	—	—	—	—
2002	Focus 8	—	—	—	—	—	—	—
2006	Focus 9 / New Skin	—	—	—	—	—	—	—
2012	Focus X	—	—	—	—	—	—	—
2014	Golden Oldies (Studio re-recordings)	—	—	—	—	—	—	—
2016	Focus 8.5 / Beyond the Horizon	—	—	—	—	—	—	—
2017	The Focus Family Album (Studio outtakes 2012–2017)	—	—	—	—	—	—	—
2019	Focus 11	—	—	—	—	—	—	—
2021	Completely Focused (Re-recordings of "Focus 1" through "Focus 12" - bonus disc of Live in Rio 2017		—	—	—	—	—	—
2024	Focus 12	—	—	—	—	—	—	—

== Compilation albums ==
Year	Title	NL	US
1974	Focus	—	—
1975	Dutch Masters: A Selection of Their Finest Recordings (1969-1973)	—	—
1993/2001	Hocus Pocus: The Best of Focus	—	—
2011	Best of Vol. 2	—	—
2017	Hocus Pocus Box	61	—
2020	Focus 50 Years Anthology	—	—

== Live albums ==
Year	Title	NL	AUS	UK	US	Certifications (sales thresholds)
1973	At the Rainbow	9	53	23	135	UK: silver
2003	Live in America 2002 same as Live on Air, 2011	—	—	—	—	—
2004	Live at the BBC 1976	—	—	—	—	—
2004	Live Legends	—	—	—	—	—
2016	Live in Europe 2009	—	—	—	—	—
2016	Live in England 2009	—	—	—	—	—
2021	Live in Rio 2017	—	—	—	—	—
2026	House of the King, Live in the USA 1973	—	—	—	—	—

== Singles ==
Year	Song	NL	BEL	GER	UK	US	CAN	Album	Notes
1970	"House of the King"	10	27	—	—	—		NED: Focus Plays Focus; UK & NA: In and Out Of Focus	
1971	"Why Dream"	—						NED: Focus Plays Focus; UK & NA: In and Out Of Focus	
1971	"Hocus Pocus"	12	—	—	—	—		NED: Focus II; UK & NA: Moving Waves	
1972	"Tommy"	18	—		—	—		NED: Focus II; UK & NA: Moving Waves	A rearrangement of two parts of "Eruption"
1972	"Sylvia"	9	—	40	4	89	—	Focus 3	
1972	"Hocus Pocus (2)"	9	—	45	20	9	18	Non-album track	A faster version of "Hocus Pocus"
1974	"Harem Scarem"	22	—	—	—	—	—	Hamburger Concerto	
1975	"Mother Focus"							Mother Focus	Released in Australia and Japan
