= Live at the BBC (Focus album) =

Live album by Focus
- Released: 2004
- Genre: Progressive rock, instrumental rock
- Length: 62:22
- Label: Hux Records

Focus chronology
Focus 8 (2002)	Live at the BBC (2004)	Focus 9 / New Skin (2006)

Live at the BBC is a live album by the Dutch progressive rock group Focus, recorded on 21 March 1976, and broadcast on Radio 1 in the BBC Concert Series, but released only in 2004 by Hux Records, in CD format.

The album was recorded just weeks after Jan Akkerman had left the band, and a new guitarist, Philip Catherine had been brought in. According to the Allmusic review, "although the sound quality is very good, the music doesn’t only suffer from Akkerman's absence; it’s also about half-comprised of boring, laid-back, instrumental jazz-funk fusion."

== Track listing ==
No.	Title	Writer(s)	Length
1.	"Virtuous Woman"	Thijs van Leer	10:58
2.	"Blues in D"	Bert Ruiter	3:46
3.	"Maximum"	van Leer	14:00
4.	"Sneezing Bull"	Philip Catherine	4:46
5.	"Sonata for Flute"	J.S. Bach, arranged by van Leer	2:47
6.	"House of the King"	Jan Akkerman, Flynn	3:15
7.	"Angel Wings"	Catherine	5:38
8.	"Little Sister/What You See"	van Leer	8:18
9.	"Hocus Pocus"	Akkerman, van Leer	5:48
Total length:			62:22

== Personnel ==
Focus

- Thijs van Leer – keyboards, flute, vocals
- Philip Catherine – guitar
- Bert Ruiter – bass
- David Kemper – drums
