= Sylvia (Focus song) =

Single by Focus

from the album Focus 3
- B-side: "Love Remembered" "House of the King" (UK)
- Released: April 1972 (NL); December 1972 (UK); July 1973 (US)
- Recorded: 1972; Olympic Studios
- Genre: Progressive rock; baroque rock
- Length: 3:32
- Label: Imperial (Netherlands); Sire (US); Polydor (UK)
- Songwriter: Thijs van Leer
- Producer: Mike Vernon

Official audio
- "Sylvia" on YouTube

Audio sample
- "Sylvia": file; help

"Sylvia" is a 1972 instrumental by the Dutch progressive rock band Focus. It was released on their 1972 album Focus 3. As a single, it became the band's biggest international hit, reaching number 4 in the UK Singles Chart, after entering the charts there on 27 January 1973. and number 89 in the US Billboard chart in August.

== Background ==
First released as a single in The Netherlands in April 1972, the song was subsequently included on the album Focus 3 in November. On 12 December, the band recorded a session for the BBC's The Old Grey Whistle Test, including "Sylvia" segueing into the yodeling of "Hocus Pocus".

Aside from Thijs van Leer's short section of falsetto vocalising, the song is instrumental.

In 1968, while in the four-piece backing band and vocal group Shaffy Chantant with lead singer Ramses Shaffy, van Leer composed the melody of the song with words by Linda Van Dijck for Sylvia Alberts to sing. It had the long winded title "I Thought I Could Do Everything On My Own, I Was Always Stripping The Town Alone" but when he played the song for Sylvia, "she didn't like it at all", so it went "on the shelf". Years later he dusted it down, and recorded it as an instrumental with Focus, and named it after her.

== Reception ==
The Rough Guide to Rock describes Akkerman's guitar melody as "exuberant". The band's Christmas 1972 appearance on the Old Grey Whistle Test, along with a number of UK gigs in late 1972, has been credited with exposing the band and helping the single reach number 4 in the UK Singles Chart. The programme's presenter, Bob Harris, is quoted as saying that the band's appearance was so well received by the audience that the pressing plant for the single was overwhelmed and only produced copies of "Sylvia" for the following week to cater for the demand.

Dave Thompson, writing for AllMusic, said that aside from the studio recording, the band's best version of the song was the one included on the 1973 At the Rainbow live album. He compared the relatively short song to the band's longer compositions, describing Akkerman's playing as an "exercise in economics".

In the US, the song peaked at number 89.

== Personnel ==
- Thijs van Leer – Hammond organ, vocals
- Jan Akkerman – electric guitar
- Bert Ruiter – bass guitar
- Pierre van der Linden – drums
