= The Focus Family Album =

Compilation album by Focus
- Released: 1 September 2017
- Recorded: 2012–2017
- Genre: Progressive rock; jazz fusion; hard rock
- Length: 88:00
- Label: In and Out of Focus Records
- Producer: Bobby Jacobs, Udo Pannekeet, Geert Scheijgrond

Focus chronology
Focus 8.5 / Beyond the Horizon (2016)	The Focus Family Album (2017)	Focus 11 (2018)

The Focus Family Album is a compilation album by the Dutch progressive rock band Focus. It shares the same concept with 1976's Ship of Memories. A total of 15 previously unreleased tracks and alternate versions are included on this set.

== Track listing ==
Disc one
No.	Title	Writer(s)	Artist	Length
1.	"Nature Is Our Friend"	Thijs van Leer	Thijs Van Leer	3:14
2.	"Song for Eva"	van Leer	Focus	9:31
3.	"Riverdance"	Pierre van der Linden	Pierre van der Linden	4:44
4.	"Victoria"	van Leer	Focus	3:53
5.	"Two-Part Intervention"	Menno Gootjes	Menno Gootjes	1:20
6.	"Mosh Blues"	van Leer, Gootjes, Jacobs, van der Linden	Focus	6:24
7.	"Raga Reverence 1"	Gootjes, Jacobs, van der Linden	Swung	5:24
8.	"The Fifth Man"	Jacobs, van Leer	Focus	4:40
9.	"Song for Yaminah"	Udo Pannekeet	Udo Pannekeet	1:53
10.	"Clair-Obscur"	van Leer	Focus	3:12

Disc two
No.	Title	Writer(s)	Artist	Length
1.	"Let us Wander"	van Leer	Thijs van Leer	2:22
2.	"Birds Come Fly Over (Le Tango)"	music: Thijs van Leer; words: Rosalie Peters	Focus	5:30
3.	"Spiritual Swung"	van der Linden	Pierre van der Linden	3:02
4.	"Santa Teresa"	van Leer	Focus	6:00
5.	"Hazel"	Gootjes	Menno Gootjes	1:56
6.	"Fine Without You"	van Leer, Gootjes, Jacobs, van der Linden, Jo de Roeck	Focus	7.01
7.	"Raga Reverence 5"	Gootjes, Jacobs, van der Linden	Swung	3:49
8.	"Five Fourth"	van Leer	Focus	7:05
9.	"Anaya"	Pannekeet	Udo Pannekeet	2:06
10.	"Winnie"	van Leer	Focus	5:25

== Disc one ==
=== "Nature Is Our Friend" ===
The first of solo pieces by Thijs, recorded in early 2017 on his 1989 Muramatsu flute, especially for The Focus Family Album. Recorded by Geert Scheijgrond.

=== "Song for Eva" ===
The second of two tracks recorded during the Focus X sessions, but not included, due to its long length on an album which already flowed well. Eva is Thijs's second eldest daughter and the spoken word portion comes from "They Say That Hope is Happiness" by Lord Byron (1788-1824).

=== "Riverdance" ===
The first piece from Pierre's Drum Poetry, an album he initially made for friends only from sessions to experiment into his own playing skills and techniques. Recorded by Marlies Helder.

=== "Victoria" ===
This is a vocal remix of the Focus X album track, which is also a shorter edit, previously unreleased until its appearance here.

=== "Two-part Intervention" ===
The first of two acoustic guitar tracks by Menno, which were recorded in June 2017 for inclusion on this compilation, a couple of weeks after the end of the Focus 11 sessions. It's called "Two-Part Intervention" because the piece two voices counter-parting, based on how Bach's two part "Inventions". Menno commented "But I liked the word Intervention better, and I’m no Bach!".

=== "Mosh Blues" ===
When Focus is on tour in South America, the members often draw on the beautiful surroundings as inspiration to write new material, such as at MOSH Studios in São Paulo, on 18 March 2012. These writing and jamming sessions are usually with a view to later recording any material on future projects, but this instrumental was advanced enough to be mixed for release in its original form.

=== "Raga Reverence 1" ===
A track from second Swung album, simply called Vol. 2, which features Bobby Jacobs, Pierre van der Linden and Menno Gootjes.

=== "The Fifth Man" ===
A track from the second Mosh Studios sessions on 13 April 2014. At one point these tracks were considered for Focus 11, before being mixed for an EP, but that ideas ultimately merged into the ideas for The Focus Family Album.

=== "Song for Yaminah" ===
Dutch bass player Udo joined Focus in November 2016 and introduces his playing to the band's catalogue with two bass pieces recorded in June 2017. The song is dedicated to his one and only love.

=== "Clair-Obscur" ===
The first of two tracks from Focus 11, these are a rare opportunity to hear early band reference mixes which are usually keep private. These two tracks are the very first view into the sessions for the album. Clair-Obscure is a technique in the art of painting, film of photography where the contrast of light and dark is stronger than reality.

== Disc two ==
=== "Let us Wander" ===
The second of the flute pieces, which give us the opportunity to hear how Thijs carries his flute around on days off between shows, playing in nature when the moment inspires him. Recorded by Geert Scheijgrond.

=== "Birds Come Fly Over (Le Tango)" ===
This track was included on the Focus X album, with lead vocals by guest singer Ivan Lins, but this is an unreleased version including the original vocal track by Thijs.

=== "Spiritual Swung" ===
The second piece from the Drum Poetry album, which has no connection with the band Swung, and is another experiment by Pierre as reexamines his own playing. Recorded by Marlies Helder.

=== "Santa Theresa" ===
The first of two tracks recorded during the Focus X sessions, but not included on the album. This track was later included on the Focus X album as a bonus track in Japan only.

=== "Hazel" ===
The second of Menno's acoustic pieces to showcase his skill as an acoustic guitar player. This piece is inspired by the hazel colored eyes, rather than a person by that name.

=== "Fine Without You" ===
This take takes Mosh Blues and adds lead vocals by guest vocalist Jo de Roeck, who previously sang on "Just Like Eddy" during the Focus 9 / New Skin sessions. The vocal session was recorded on 11 June 2013.

=== "Raga Reverence 5" ===
The concept of the band Swung was to experiment and improvise during Focus soundcheck and downtime, before Thijs arrived, which resulted in various innovative improvised recordings by the trio.

=== "Five Fourth" ===
This track was written by Thijs and who brought manuscripts with him to the Mosh 2014 session and the band sight read the piece as they played it. "Five-Four" was recorded in that first take.

=== "Anaya" ===
Uno plays a custom built six-string bass guitar on these tracks, which he has been playing since 1994. Anaya is the 9-year-old daughter of Yaminah.

=== "Winnie" ===
The second of two tracks that are the very first view into the sessions for the Focus 11 album. Winnie is named for Menno's daughter.

== Personnel ==
- Thijs van Leer - Hammond organ, flute, vocoder, vocals
- Pierre van der Linden - drums, percussion
- Menno Gootjes - guitars
- Udo Pannekeet - bass guitar
- Bobby Jacobs - bass guitar
- Jo de Roeck - vocals on "Fine Without You"
  - Swung - a trio with Menno Gootjes, Bobby Jacobs and Pierre van der Linden
