= Focus X =

- Cover art by Roger Dean

Studio album by Focus
- Released: 5 November 2012
- Recorded: 2012
- Studio: Wedgeview Studios (Woerdense Verlaat, Netherlands); Fieldwork Studios (Schoten, Belgium); Skystudio; Bassbob Studios
- Genre: Jazz fusion; progressive rock
- Length: 49:40
- Label: Eastworld Recordings
- Producer: Bobby Jacobs, Geert Scheijgrond

Focus chronology
Focus 9 / New Skin (2006)	Focus X (2012)	Golden Oldies (2014)

Focus X is the tenth studio album by the Dutch progressive rock band Focus, released on 5 November 5, 2012 by Eastworld Recordings.

== Background ==
Focus X is the group's first studio album in six years. The album features Menno Gootjes on guitar, replacing Niels van der Steenhoven, who played guitar on the ensemble's previous album Focus 9 / New Skin (2009). The Japanese edition contains two bonus tracks, "Santa Teresa", and a live version of the band's successful 1971 single, "Hocus Pocus". The album generally received positive reviews. The cover art is designed and painted by Roger Dean.

== Track listing ==
No.	Title	Writer(s)	Length
1.	"Father Bacchus"	Menno Gootjes	4:04
2.	"Focus 10"	Thijs van Leer	5:48
3.	"Victoria"	van Leer	5:28
4.	"Amok In Kindergarten"	van Leer	5:00
5.	"All Hens On Deck"	van Leer	5:45
6.	"Birds Come Fly Over (Le Tango)"	van Leer, Roselie Peters	5:26
7.	"Hoeratio" (Words: Horatius, taken from "Ars Poetica")	Bobby Jacobs	5:38
8.	"Talk Of The Clown"	van Leer	2:59
9.	"Message Magique"	Ben van der Linden	3:53
10.	"Crossroads"	van Leer, Peters	5:39

Japanese edition bonus tracks
No.	Title	Writer(s)	Length
11.	"Santa Teresa"	van Leer	5:59
12.	"Hocus Pocus (live)"	van Leer, Jan Akkerman	17:30

== Personnel ==
- Thijs van Leer – Hammond organ, flute, vocoder, spoken vocals (tracks 1, 7, 11)
- Pierre van der Linden – drums, percussion
- Menno Gootjes – guitar, acoustic guitars (track 8)
- Bobby Jacobs – bass guitar, pro ducting and mixing
- Ivan Lins – vocals (tracks 6, 11)
- Berenice van Leer – vocals (track 10)
- Geert Scheijgrond – producing and mixing
