= O Kerstnacht, schoner dan de dagen =

Dutch Christmas carol

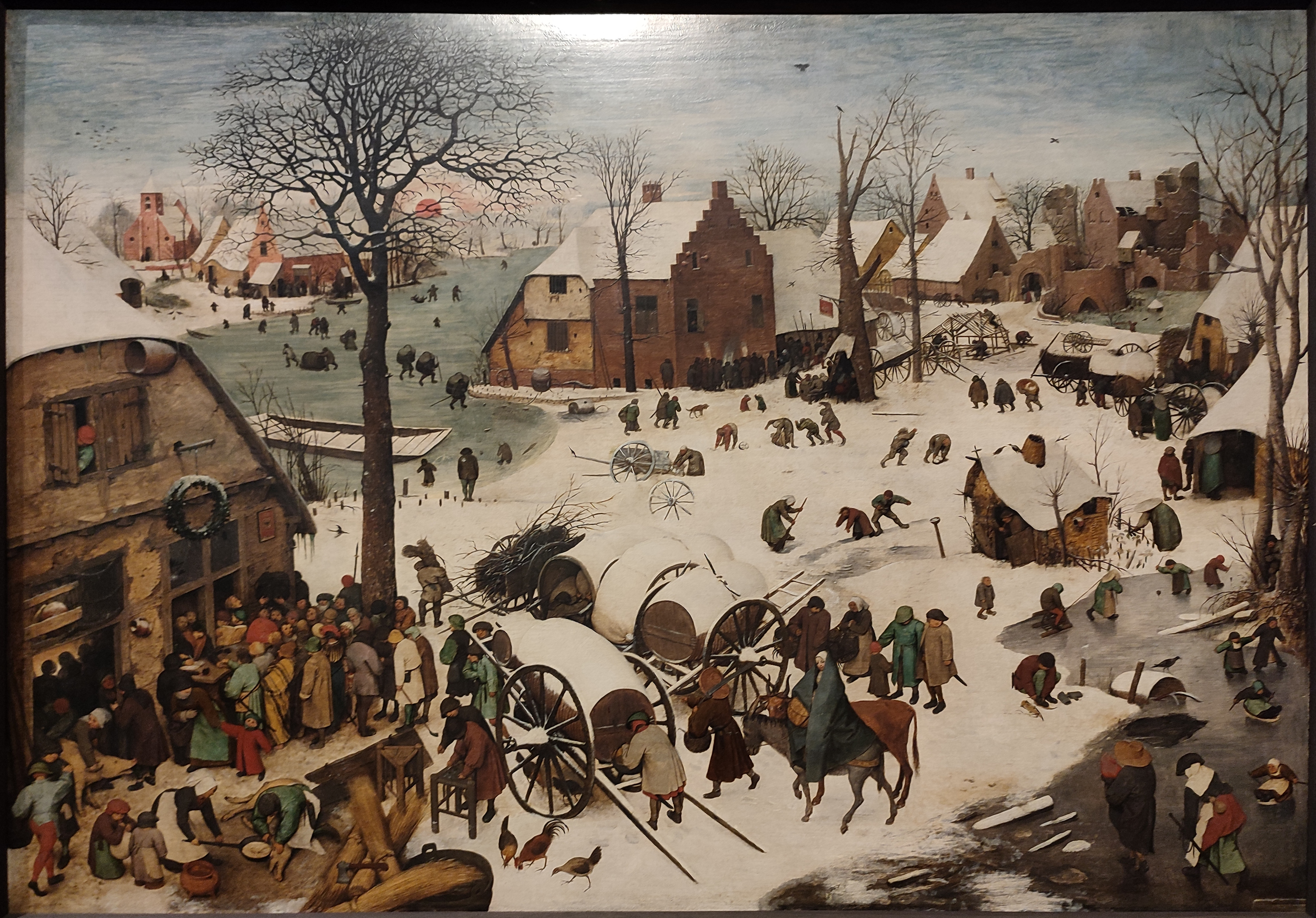
The Census at Bethlehem by Pieter Bruegel the Elder

O Kerstnacht, schoner dan de dagen (O Christmas Night, more beautiful than any day!) is a Dutch hymn that is usually referred to as a Christmas carol, although it does not refer to the birth of Jesus, but rather to the infanticide in Bethlehem. The poet and playwright Joost van den Vondel wrote it for the opening of the theatre Schouwburg of Van Campen in Amsterdam, the stage work Gijsbrecht van Aemstel, whose première was around Christmas 1637. It contains this song as a dance.

Following the example of Greek choral singing, van Vondel completed the act with spoken or sung lyrical reflections, which are detached from the actual action. The third act ends with this song sung by nuns "Rey van Clarissen" (reydance of the Poor Clares). (Gijsbrecht, vs. 904 – 950)

The dance later came to have a life of its own as a hymn in the Christmas environment. In 1644, it was included in the Livre Septième.

It is not clear who was the composer of the melody and the polyphonic phrase, but they were alternately attributed to Cornelis Padbrué or Dirk Janszoon Sweelinck.

Also in the 20th century, there were still arrangements of the song, including one for four-part church choir by Gaston Feremans and an adaptation by the Dutch church musician Jan van Biezen. Because he did not appreciate the common version – he found the octave jump on "Kerstnacht" inappropriate – he wrote in 1973 a new version of the tune for the "Liedboek voor de Kerken".

The song gained a degree of fame by the progressive rock band Focus, who in 1974 incorporated the first two verses of the song in their composition Hamburger Concerto, where it can be heard at around 15 minutes into the piece.

The text of the first three stanzas – here reproduced in the original spelling of Joost van den Vondels – are:

O Kersnacht, schooner dan de daegen!
Hoe kan Herodes 't licht verdraegen,
dat in uw duisternisse blinckt?
En wort geviert en aengebeden!
Zijn hooghmoed luistert na geen reden,
hoe schel die in zijn ooren klinckt.

Hy pooght d'onnoosle te vernielen
door 't moorden van onnoosle zielen!
En werckt een stad en landgeschrey,
In Bethlehem en op den acker.
En maeckt den geest van Rachel wacker,
die waeren gaet door beemd en wey,

dan na het westen, dan na'et oosten.
Wie zal die droeve moeder troosten
nu zy haer lieve kinders derft?
Nu zy die ziet in 't bloed versmooren,
aleerze naulix zijn geboren,
en zoo veel zwaerden rood geverft!

O Christmas Night, more beautiful than any day!
How can Herod bear the light,
that shines in your darkness?
That is celebrated and worshiped!
His arrogance does not listen to any reasoning
how shocking it sounds in his ears.

He tries to destroy the Innocent,
by killing innocent souls!
He causes a cry in city and country,
in Bethlehem and in the field.
He awakens the spirit of Rachel,
passing through fields and meadows,

soon to the west, soon to the east.
Who is to comfort the sad mother,
Now that she misses her beloved children?
Now that she sees those drowning in blood,
who are just born,
and so many swords dyed red!

In the Liedboek voor de Kerken (church hymnal), five of the eight verses were recorded. The proposition Wat kan de blind staatzucht brouwen wanneer ze raast uit misvertrouwen ('What can lust for blind power do if it rages with mistrust') from the 7th stanza is regularly cited in Dutch to describe tyranny and brutal politics.
