= Don't Ask Me (TV programme) =

1974 British television series

Don't Ask Me is a British television science show made by Yorkshire Television for the ITV network and ran from 1974 to 1978. It attempted to answer science-based questions and contributors included Magnus Pyke (natural sciences), Rob Buckman (medicine), David Bellamy (biology), Miriam Stoppard (medicine), and Derek Griffiths. Those behind the scenes included Adam Hart-Davis, who later became a well-known science presenter in his own right. The theme music was "House of the King" by the contemporary Dutch progressive rock band Focus.

The series was rebroadcast on TVOntario in the late 1970s and early 1980s.

A follow-up called Don't Just Sit There ran for 19 episodes from 1979 to 1980. It was also produced by Yorkshire Television and featured the same panel.
