= At the Rainbow =

Live album by Focus
- Released: October 1973
- Recorded: May 5, 1973
- Venue: Rainbow Theatre, London
- Genre: Progressive rock
- Length: 42:26
- Label: Imperial
- Producer: Mike Vernon

Focus chronology
Focus 3 (1972)	At the Rainbow (1973)	Hamburger Concerto (1974)

Professional ratings
Review scores
Source	Rating
Allmusic	3/5 stars

At the Rainbow (re-released as Live at the Rainbow) is the first live album from the Dutch rock band Focus, released in October 1973 on Imperial Records. The album was recorded at the Rainbow Theatre in London on 5 May 1973 by The Pye Mobile Unit, recording engineer Alan Perkins. A studio album was initially slated for release, but it was shelved due to disagreements within the band. (An album compiled from the tapes of these sessions was later released with the title Ship of Memories.) At the Rainbow was released instead.

== Track listing ==
=== Vinyl release ===
Side one
No.	Title	Writer(s)	Original album	Length
1.	"Focus III"	Thijs van Leer	Focus III	3:52
2.	"Answers? Questions! Questions? Answers!"	Jan Akkerman, Bert Ruiter	Focus III	11:29
3.	"Focus II"	van Leer	Focus II (aka Moving Waves)	4:36

Side two
No.	Title	Writer(s)	Original album	Length
1.	"Eruption (Excerpt): Orfeus (1:33); Answer (1:25); Orfeus (1:22); Answer (0:20); Pupilla (1:10); Tommy (1:54); Pupilla (0:45)"	van Leer, except "Tommy" by Tom Barlage	Focus II (aka Moving Waves)	8:29
2.	"Hocus Pocus"	Akkerman, van Leer	Focus II (aka Moving Waves)	8:30
3.	"Sylvia"	van Leer	Focus III	2:47
4.	"Hocus Pocus (Reprise)"	Akkerman, van Leer	Focus II (aka Moving Waves)	2:46

=== CD release 1988 ===
No.	Title	Writer(s)	Original album	Length
1.	"Focus III"	Thijs van Leer	Focus III	3:54
2.	"Answers? Questions! Questions? Answers!"	Jan Akkerman, Bert Ruiter	Focus III	11:38
3.	"Focus II"	van Leer	Focus II (aka Moving Waves)	4:27
4.	"Eruption (Excerpt): "Orfeus" (1:33); "Answer" (1:25); "Orfeus" (1:22); "Answer" (0:20); "Pupilla" (1:10); "Tommy" (1:54); "Pupilla" (0:45)"	van Leer, except "Tommy" by Tom Barlage	Focus II (aka Moving Waves)	8:29
5.	"Hocus Pocus"	Akkerman, van Leer	Focus II (aka Moving Waves)	8:29
6.	"Sylvia"	van Leer	Focus III	2:48
7.	"Hocus Pocus (Reprise)"	Akkerman, van Leer	Focus II (aka Moving Waves)	2:47

== Performed at the show, but unreleased ==
1. "Anonymus 2"
2. "House of the King" (Instrumental) (filmed)
3. Lute solo ("Britannia" by John Dowland) (filmed)

== Personnel ==
Focus

- Thijs van Leer – keyboards, flute, vocals
- Jan Akkerman – guitar
- Bert Ruiter – bass guitar
- Pierre van der Linden – drums

== Charts ==
Chart (1973–1974)	Peak position
Australian Albums (Kent Music Report)	53
Dutch Albums (Album Top 100)	9
Norwegian Albums (VG-lista)	22
UK Albums (OCC)	23
US Billboard 200	153

== Certifications ==
Region	Certification	Certified units/sales
United Kingdom (BPI)	Silver	60,000^{^}
^{^} Shipments figures based on certification alone.
