= Focus 11 =

- Cover art by Roger Dean

Studio album by Focus
- Released: 10 November 2018
- Genre: Progressive rock; jazz fusion
- Length: 52:41
- Label: In And Out Of Focus Records
- Producer: Geert Scheijgrond, Udo Pannekeet

Focus chronology
| The Focus Family Album (2017) | Focus 11 (2018) | Focus 12 (2024) |

Focus 11 is the thirteenth studio album by Dutch progressive rock band Focus, released in November 2018 on in and Out of Focus Records. It is their first album to feature bassist Udo Pannekeet, who replaced Bobby Jacobs in 2016.

The album cover was produced by renowned artist Roger Dean.

== Track listing ==
1. "Who's Calling?" (Thijs van Leer) – 5:27
2. "Heaven" (van Leer) – 4:26
3. "Theodora Na Na Na" (van Leer) – 4:27
4. "How Many Miles?" (van Leer) – 4:48
5. "Mazzel" (van Leer) – 4:23
6. "Winnie" (van Leer) – 5:13
7. "Palindrome" (van Leer) – 5:33
8. "Clair-Obscur" (van Leer) – 3:14
9. "Mare Nostrum" (Udo Pannekeet) – 5:08
10. "Final Analysis" (van Leer) – 3:51
11. "Focus 11" (van Leer) – 6:11

== Personnel ==
- Thijs van Leer – organ, piano, synthesizers, flute, vocals
- Menno Gootjes – guitar
- Udo Pannekeet – bass, mixing
- Pierre van der Linden – drums
- Geert Scheijgrond – producing, mixing

== Charts ==
| Chart (2019) | Peak position |
|---|---|
| UK Progressive Albums (OCC) | 16 |
| UK Rock & Metal Albums (OCC) | 23 |
