= Live at the Rainbow (disambiguation) =

Live at the Rainbow is an album by Iron Maiden.

Live at the Rainbow may also refer to:

- Live at the Rainbow, an album by Focus
- Live at the Rainbow '74, an album by Queen
- Live at the Rainbow, a bootleg album by Pink Floyd, see Pink Floyd bootleg recordings
