= Focus 3 =

Album by Focus

Studio album by Focus
- Released: November 1972
- Recorded: July 1972
- Studios: Olympic "B" Studios (Barnes, London)
- Genres: Progressive rock; baroque rock; jazz fusion
- Length: 70:25
- Label: Imperial
- Producer: Mike Vernon

Focus chronology
Focus II (Moving Waves) (1971)	Focus 3 (1972)	At the Rainbow (1973)

Focus 3 is the third studio album by Dutch rock band Focus, released as a double album in November 1972 on Imperial Records. Recorded after touring in support of their previous album, Moving Waves (1971), the album saw the band write extended pieces and is their first with bassist Bert Ruiter in the group's line-up.

Focus 3 received a positive reception upon its release. It went to No. 1 in the Netherlands for one week and reached No. 6 on the UK Albums Chart and No. 35 on the US Billboard 200. "Sylvia" was released as the album's sole single, which reached No. 4 in the UK and No. 89 in the US. The album was certified gold by the Recording Industry Association of America for selling in excess of 500,000 copies.

== Production ==
=== Recording ===
By 1972, Focus had stabilised with a line-up of organist and vocalist Thijs van Leer, guitarist Jan Akkerman, drummer Pierre van der Linden, and bassist Bert Ruiter. In July 1972, after touring in supporting their previous album, Focus II (1971), the band retreated to Olympic Studios in Barnes, south west London, to record their next album. Initially a single LP was intended to be recorded but the group had written a considerable amount of new material, so the group opted to release a double album. Mike Vernon reprised his role as the record's producer with George Chkiantz assigned as recording engineer. Two versions of the album's sleeve design exist; its North American release features each member photographed during a performance on the BBC music television show The Old Grey Whistle Test with a black background. The second, designed by Hamish Grimes, depicts a close-up of van Leer playing the flute with the title over his face.

=== Songs ===
"Round Goes the Gossip" features five lines from the poem Aeneid by the ancient Roman poet Virgil, sung in Latin by van Leer and its chorus hook, "Round goes the gossip", also sung by Vernon. The five lines from the poem are printed on the album's sleeve in Latin and English with the 1916 translation by Henry Fairclough. "Love Remembered" is a track written by Akkerman, playing an acoustic guitar with van Leer's flute, which is based on a young couple's morning walk. Van Leer wrote "Sylvia" in 1968 when he was a cast member of Shaffy Chantant, a Dutch theatre production by singer and actor Ramses Shaffy. He was not fond of a composition that singer Sylvia Alberts was given to sing for her solo performance, so he wrote the instrumental with a set of lyrics in English written by Linda van Dyck. Its original title was a long one: "I Thought I Could Do Everything on My Own, I Was Always Stripping the Town Alone", and concerned an independent young woman who fell apart after she met the love of her life. Van Leer kept the music, re-arranging it as an instrumental track when it came to selecting material for the album. He renamed it "Sylvia" after Alberts "to tease [her] a little". The track includes a guitar introduction written by van Leer's brother Frank. Focus biographer Peet Johnson highlights several musical references and similarities that van Leer incorporates in "Focus III", including riffs from Bernard Hermann, "Don't Sleep in the Subway" made famous by Petula Clark in 1967, Tchaikovsky, and Schubert.

"Answers? Questions! Questions? Answers!" was titled by Akkerman and features extended flute and guitar solos. Ruiter came up with its basic riff, with Akkerman coming up with the "second part". Akkerman wrote "Elspeth of Nottingham" after driving around England for a holiday in 1967, stopping in a town in the Cotswolds where he first heard guitarist Julian Bream play the lute which inspired him to learn the instrument. Akkerman requested to include birdsong on the recording; Vernon suggested to include sounds of cows mooing and the song's title, the "Elspeth" being an old Scottish variant of the name Elizabeth. "Carnival Fugue" borrows from Johann Sebastian Bach's The Well-Tempered Clavier before venturing into cool jazz territory, then culminates in a rock finale with piccolo improvisations and a hint of Calypso rhythms on guitar. "Anonymus II" borrows its theme from "Anonymus" from the band's first album (an extended jam based on the traditional tune "Dit le bourguignon,") and features a solo spot for all four members. At 26 minutes in length, it remains the group's longest recorded piece.

The vinyl pressings of the album includes "House of the King", a track Focus recorded for their first album, Focus Plays Focus (1970), intended to fill up space on side four. The two former members who perform on the recording, bassist Martin Dresden and drummer Hans Cleuver, are not credited on the album sleeve.

== Release ==
Released in November 1972, Focus 3 was a commercial success for the band, reaching No. 1 in the Netherlands for one week. It reached a peak of No. 6 on the UK Albums Chart in March 1973 during a 16-week stay on the chart. In the US, it reached No. 35 on the Billboard 200. "Sylvia" was released as the album's sole single, which reached No. 4 in the UK and No. 89 in the US. In November 1973, Billboard announced the album was certified Gold by the Recording Industry Association of America for selling in excess of 500,000 copies. The album reached the same certification in the Netherlands and the UK.

=== Reception ===
Professional ratings
Review scores
Source	Rating
Allmusic	4.5/5 stars
Rolling Stone	(not rated)

In his retrospective review for AllMusic, Ben Davies rates the album four-and-a-half stars out of five, highlighting the band's "jollier, more accessible tone" compared to their more serious sound on Moving Waves. He rates "Sylvia" a "classic" track that continues to be "one of the most loved and best remembered" songs from the band's catalogue. He concludes with: "To be frank, this LP has it all: diverse songs, astounding musicianship, one of the finest singles ever released — Focus III should unquestionably be ranked alongside the likes of ... rock's greatest". Down Beat rated Focus 3 five stars out of five in 1972, citing it to be "a sincere, emotional mixture of classical, jazz, and rock."

== Track listing ==
=== Vinyl version ===
Side one
No.	Title	Writer(s)	Length
1.	"Round Goes the Gossip"	Thijs van Leer	5:16
2.	"Love Remembered"	Jan Akkerman	2:49
3.	"Sylvia"	van Leer	3:32
4.	"Carnival Fugue"	van Leer	6:02

Side two
No.	Title	Writer(s)	Length
1.	"Focus III"	van Leer	6:07
2.	"Answers? Questions! Questions? Answers!"	Akkerman, Bert Ruiter	14:03

Side three
No.	Title	Writer(s)	Length
1.	"Anonymus II (Part 1)"	van Leer, Akkerman, Ruiter, Pierre van der Linden	19:28

Side four
No.	Title	Writer(s)	Length
1.	"Anonymus II (Conclusion)"	van Leer, Akkerman, Ruiter, van der Linden	7:30
2.	"Elspeth of Nottingham"	Akkerman	3:25
3.	"House of the King"	Akkerman	2:23

=== CD reissue ===
No.	Title	Writer(s)	Length
1.	"Round Goes the Gossip"	Thijs van Leer	5:12
2.	"Love Remembered"	Jan Akkerman	2:50
3.	"Sylvia"	van Leer	3:31
4.	"Carnival Fugue"	van Leer	6:09
5.	"Focus III"	van Leer	6:05
6.	"Answers? Questions! Questions? Answers!"	Akkerman, Bert Ruiter	13:48
7.	"Elspeth of Nottingham"	Akkerman	3:10
8.	"Anonymus II"	van Leer, Akkerman, Ruiter, Pierre van der Linden	26:24
Total length:			67:12

== Personnel ==
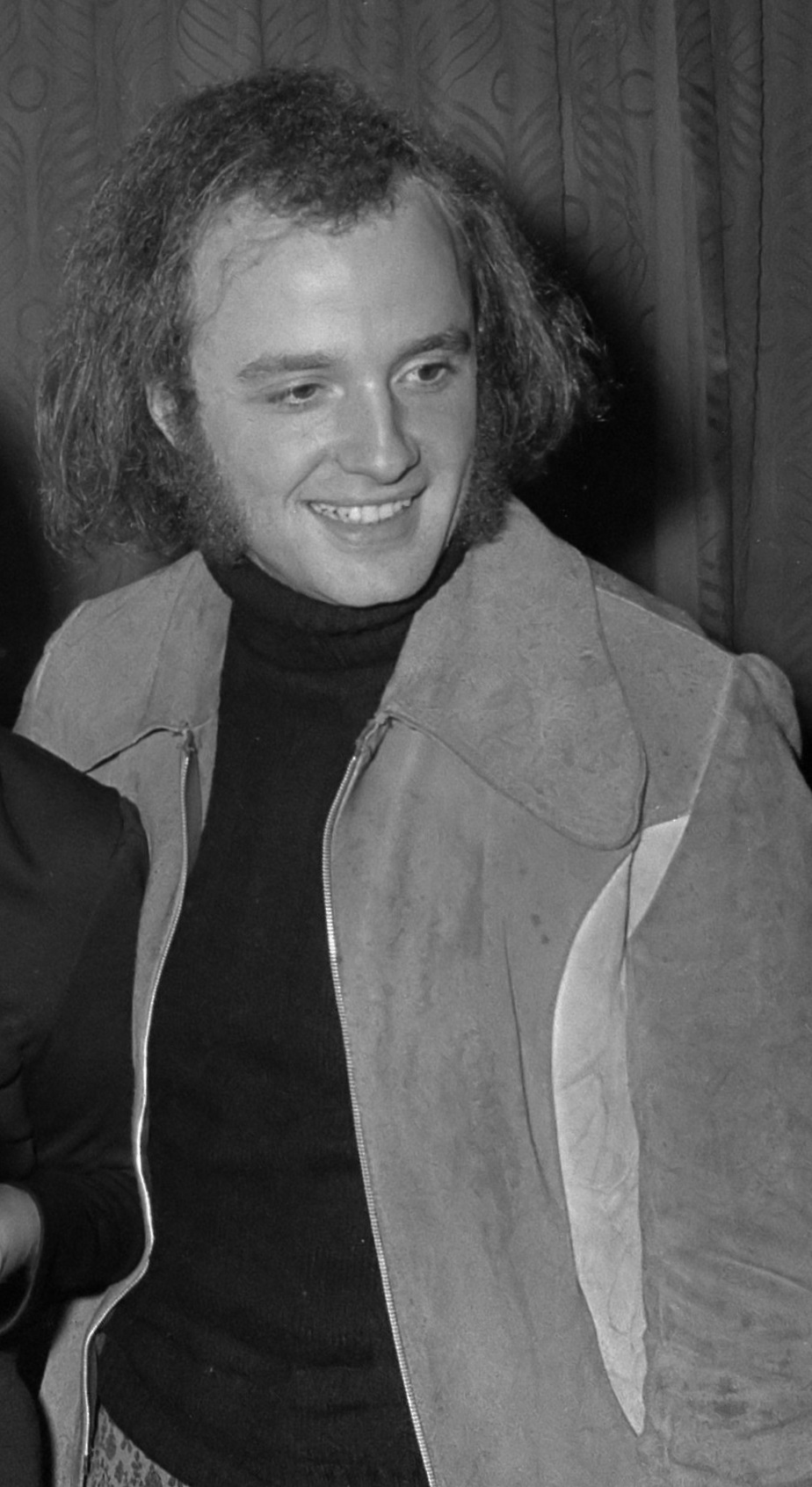
Frontman Thijs van Leer in 1971

Focus

- Thijs van Leer – vocals, Hammond organ, piano, alto flute, piccolo, harpsichord
- Jan Akkerman – guitars, lute
- Bert Ruiter – bass guitar
- Pierre van der Linden – drums

Additional musicians

- Mike Vernon – backing vocals on "Round Goes the Gossip" (uncredited)
- Martin Dresden – bass guitar on "House of the King" (original vinyl version, uncredited)
- Hans Cleuver – drums on "House of the King" (original vinyl version, uncredited)

Production

- Mike Vernon – producer
- George Chkiantz – recording engineer
- Bill Levy – art direction
- Frank Marcelino – design

== Charts ==
Chart (1972–1973)	Peak position
Australian Albums (Kent Music Report)	36
Canada Top Albums/CDs (RPM)	54
Dutch Albums (Album Top 100)	1
Norwegian Albums (VG-lista)	20
UK Albums (Official Charts)	6
US Billboard 200	35

== Certifications ==
Region	Certification	Certified units/sales
United Kingdom (BPI)	Gold	100,000^{^}
United States (RIAA)	Gold	500,000^{^}
^{^} Shipments figures based on certification alone.
