= Focus con Proby =

Studio album by Focus
- Released: January 1978
- Recorded: 1977
- Genre: Progressive rock; jazz fusion
- Length: 48:07
- Label: EMI
- Producer: Yde De Jong

Focus chronology
Ship of Memories (1976)	Focus con Proby (1978)	Focus 8 (2002)

Professional ratings
Review scores
Source	Rating
Allmusic	3/5 stars

Focus con Proby is the sixth studio album by the Dutch rock band Focus, released in 1978 on EMI Records. It features five tracks with vocals from American singer P. J. Proby. The record also features guitarists Eef Albers and Philip Catherine, drummer Steve Smith (then with Jean-Luc Ponty and later to become part of Journey), as well as the two Focus members from previous albums. Smith and Albers would later go on to collaborate on the second album of Smith's band Vital Information.

== Reception ==
In a mixed review in the Richmond Review, reviewer Bob Beech preferred the instrumental tracks over the songs with vocals. He deemed Proby's voice more mellow than his previous records which he preferred, but felt it was out of place on a Focus album. Brian Brennan wrote in Calgary Herald that while Albers is "an accomplished musician" he does not live up to the standard of past Focus guitarist Jan Akkerman. He thought the album consisted of "fussy instrumental work, aimless, hollow and rather uninviting".

== Track listing ==
Side one
No.	Title	Writer(s)	Length
1.	"Wingless"	Roselie van Leer, Thijs van Leer	5:35
2.	"Orion"	Eef Albers	4:08
3.	"Night Flight"	Albers	3:40
4.	"Eddy"	R. van Leer, T. van Leer	5:54
5.	"Sneezing Bull"	Philip Catherine	4:27

Side two
No.	Title	Writer(s)	Length
1.	"Brother"	R. van Leer, T. van Leer	5:19
2.	"Tokyo Rose"	R. van Leer	5:08
3.	"Maximum"	Bert Ruiter, T. van Leer	8:40
4.	"How Long"	R. van Leer, T. van Leer	5:16

== Personnel ==
Musicians

- Thijs van Leer – Hammond organ, piano, electric piano, Mellotron, synthesiser, flute
- Bert Ruiter – bass guitar
- Steve Smith – drums
- Philip Catherine – acoustic guitar, rhythm guitar, lead guitar on "Sneezing Bull", "Maximum" and "How Long"
- Eef Albers – rhythm guitar, lead guitar (except above)
- P. J. Proby – vocals on "Wingless", "Eddy", "Brother", "Tokyo Rose" and "How Long"

Production

- Yde de Jong – production
- Jan van Vrijaldenhoven – engineer
- Mike Stavrou – engineer
- Jacques Heere – cover design

== Charts ==
Chart (1978)	Peak position
Dutch Albums (Album Top 100)	27
