= Ship of Memories =

Compilation album by Focus
- Released: November 1976
- Recorded: January 1970 – mid-1975 in various locations
- Genres: Progressive rock; jazz fusion
- Length: 36:22
- Label: EMi-Bovema
- Producers: Hubert Terheggen, Mike Vernon

Focus chronology
Mother Focus (1975)	Ship of Memories (1976)	Focus con Proby (1978)

Professional ratings
Review scores
Source	Rating
Allmusic	2.5/5 stars

Ship of Memories is a compilation album from the Dutch rock band Focus, released in 1976 on EMI-Bovema. During a period of group inactivity, longtime associate Hubert Terheggen asked their producer Mike Vernon to select previously unreleased material for official release. Compiled without any active involvement by any band member, the recordings date from January 1970 to mid-1975, and largely during unproductive recording sessions in 1973 for a follow-up studio album to Focus 3 (1972).

== Production ==
The first four songs were recorded in May 1973 at Chipping Norton Recording Studios in Chipping Norton, Oxfordshire. "P.'s March", though seemingly a pun on "peace march", was meant to be "Pierre's March" in honour of the drummer, Pierre van der Linden. The second, or "B" motif first appeared as a "B" motif in the song, "Carmen Elysium", on Thijs van Leer's "Introspection 2" album. Written in the classical style by Thijs van Leer, but performed with rock arrangements, this song alternates between uptempo, major key choruses, with melody stated on flute and piccolo, and minor key Bachian verses, with melody stated on electric guitar. "Can't Believe My Eyes", originally entitled "Can't Believe My Ears" and subtitled "Dance Macabre", is a bleak, hard rock instrumental written by Jan Akkerman. In stark contrast is van Leer's gentle jazz ballad "Focus V." "Out of Vesuvius" is an excerpt from a 1973 jam session, which would eventually evolve into a long composition like "Eruption". "Glider" marked a move into disco-funk territory, and was recorded in Brussels, Belgium with drum machine and electric sitar amongst the instrumentation. The song was later rearranged and recorded as "Mother Focus". "Red Sky at Night" features synthesised bass parts, and was recorded with vocals as "O Avondrood" (Oh Evening glow) on a Dutch music compilation. Recorded in 1970, "Spoke the Lord Creator" was the band's first attempt at using "Brahms Variations on a Theme by Haydn" in a rock music context. It was later recorded as "Starter" on the 1974 Hamburger Concerto album. "Crackers" is another disco-funk instrumental with extended chords more common to jazz. Lastly, "Ship of Memories" is an excerpt of an instrumental on drums and harmonium written and performed by Pierre van der Linden.

== Track listing ==
=== Vinyl release ===
Side One
No.	Title	Writer(s)	Recorded	Length
1.	"P's March"	Thijs van Leer	May 1973	4:43
2.	"Can't Believe My Eyes"	Jan Akkerman	May 1973	5:17
3.	"Focus V"	van Leer	May 1973	3:02
4.	"Out of Vesuvius"	Akkerman, Bert Ruiter, Pierre van der Linden, van Leer	May 1973	5:50

Side Two
No.	Title	Writer(s)	Recorded	Length
1.	"Glider"	Akkerman	May 1973	4:38
2.	"Red Sky at Night"	Akkerman, van Leer	May 1975	5:50
3.	"Spoke the Lord Creator"	van Leer	January 26, 1970	2:32
4.	"Crackers"	Akkerman	May 1975	2:42
5.	"Ship of Memories"	van der Linden	May 1973	1:48

=== CD release ===
No.	Title	Writer(s)	Recorded	Length
1.	"P's March"	Thijs van Leer	May 1973	4:48
2.	"Can't Believe My Eyes"	Jan Akkerman	May 1973	5:23
3.	"Focus V"	van Leer	May 1973	3:02
4.	"Out of Vesuvius"	Akkerman, Bert Ruiter, Pierre van der Linden, van Leer	May 1973	5:50
5.	"Glider"	Akkerman	May 1973	4:39
6.	"Red Sky at Night"	Akkerman, van Leer	May 1975	5:52
7.	"Spoke the Lord Creator"	van Leer	January 26, 1970	2:33
8.	"Crackers"	Akkerman	May 1975	2:44
9.	"Ship of Memories"	van der Linden	May 1973	1:47
10.	"Hocus Pocus (US Single Version, bonus track)"	van Leer, Akkerman	December 13, 1972	3:25
Total length:				40:06

Recording dates as given in the liner notes of the 50 Years: Anthology 1970-1976 box set. The cover art shows the German World War II heavy cruiser "Admiral Hipper" recovering an Arado Ar 196 plane.

== Personnel ==
- Thijs van Leer – Hammond organ, piano, Moog synthesizer, mellotron, electric piano, drum machine (track 5), Moog bass synth (track 6), flute, non-lexical vocables
- Jan Akkerman – guitar, electric sitar (track 5)
- Bert Ruiter – bass guitar (tracks 1, 2, 3, 4, 5, 8, 10)
- Martin Dresden – bass guitar (track 7)
- Pierre van der Linden – drums (tracks 1, 2, 3, 4, 9)
- Hans Cleuver – drums (track 7)
- David Kemper – drums (track 6, 8)
