= Jan Dumée =

Dutch musician

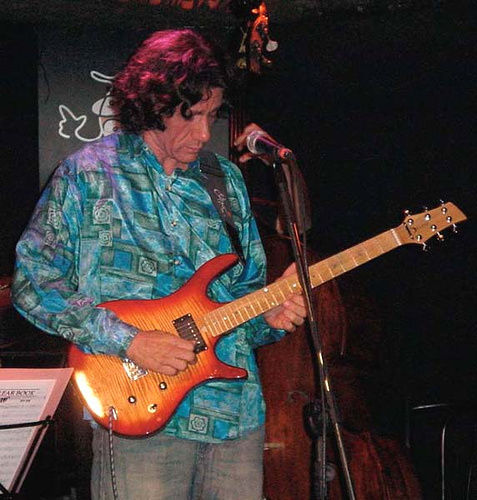
Jan Dumée, 2006

Jan Dumée (born April 6, 1965) is a Dutch rock/jazz guitar player, composer and record producer.

== Biography ==
Jan Dumée is known for his rich and surprising compositional work and guitar playing that draws on a palette of many expressions, sounds and great musical taste. As a unique composer with a significant own signature his work is widely praised.

The music of Dumée is described in the reviews as ‘very creative’, ‘non-conformist in approach’, ‘ear-tickling’ and ‘knowing no bounds’. In an extraordinary way he showed this with his O Septeto Plus, with musicians from Brazil, Senegal. Argentina, Holland and Croatia. With this ensemble he recorded the album ‘Rodinha‘. ‘Rodinha’ was recognized in 1998 as one of the best Dutch music productions in the category worldmusic by Radio Holland (worldbroadcasting), Conamus, several reviews in the press Since 1991 he regular visited Brazil to do what is called ‘work in the field’, which helped him become a versatile composer in different Brazilian music styles.

From 2001–2006 Dumée performed as guitarplayer/composer in Dutch’ foremost progjazzrock-group of all times: Focus, playing with Dutch icons Thijs van Leer and Pierre van der Linden. He recorded with Focus the albums: ‘Focus 8‘, ‘Live in South America‘ and the DVD/CD ‘Live in America‘. During his time with Focus, Dumée recorded in Rio de Janeiro in 2003 his solo-album ‘Rio on the Rocks‘ (released in 2005 by the Rock Symphony label): a blend of (prog)rock-, jazz-, Brazilian- and classical- music with musicians from Rio de Janeiro.

Since 2007 Dumée is leading together with ex-Uriah Heep/Lucifer's Friend singer John Lawton the multinational rock band called On The Rocks, officially known as OTR. Together (again) with musicians from Rio de Janeiro, Brazil. They recorded their first CD ‘Mamonama‘ released in the United States, Europe and Japan by the rocklabel Lion Music.

Since 2000 on Dumée has been involved in ‘The Cubrabop Quintet‘ ( with the band's own compositions), with musicians from Holland, France and Germany (Cd 'Cubrabop' released April 2011).

Since 2012 his musical creations in ’Impressionistic Brazilian Jazz’ can be listened with the heartwarming and virtuoso quintet Dumee & Dijkgraaf Quinteto, with some of the finest musicians from Brazil, having had released its first CD ‘Heloisando‘.

His most recent work was with the Brazilian Symphony Orchestra of Barra Mansa (Rio de Janeiro) as an arranger/composer and performing soloist in Brasil 2014 together with Wim Dijkgraaf.

== Discography ==
=== Solo albums ===
- Rio On The Rocks (2005)

=== With Dumee & Dijkgraaf Quinteto (2012) ===
- Heloisando

=== With Cubrabop Quintet (2012) ===
- Cubrabop

=== With On The Rocks ===
- Mamonama (2008)

=== With Focus ===
- Focus 8 (2002)
- Live in the USA (CD/DVD, 2003)
- Live in South America (2004)

=== With O Septeto Plus ===
- A Rodinha (1998)
