= Mother Focus =

Studio album by Focus
- Released: October 1975
- Genre: Funk
- Length: 37:14
- Label: Polydor, Atco
- Producer: Focus

Focus chronology
Hamburger Concerto (1974)	Mother Focus (1975)	Ship of Memories (1976)

Professional ratings
Review scores
Source	Rating
Allmusic	.
Christgau's Record Guide	C+

Mother Focus is the fifth studio album by the band Focus, released in 1975 on Polydor (cat. no. 2310 408) in Europe, on Atco Records in North America and on EMI in Japan.

Some tracks on the album mark a departure from the progressive rock style that dominated the group's prior work, and herald a funk music style with light jazz and pop at the centre. Unlike previous albums, the tracks were also much shorter, the longest being 3:55. Bassist Bert Ruiter provided most of the themes, as van Leer had just recorded a solo album, O My Love, of his own music, and Jan Akkerman withheld compositions for Eli, his forthcoming album with Kaz Lux.

The closing track, "Father Bach", is credited as a 'traditional tune', arranged and adopted by Thijs van Leer, but in reality it consists of the opening lines of J. S. Bach’s St. Matthew Passion.

== Track listing ==
Track listing of Dutch vinyl release 1975.

Side one
No.	Title	Composer	Length
1.	"Mother Focus"	Jan Akkerman, Bert Ruiter, Thijs van Leer	3:03
2.	"I Need a Bathroom"	Ruiter	3:02
3.	"Bennie Helder"	Leer	3:31
4.	"Soft Vanilla"	Ruiter	3:00
5.	"Hard Vanilla"	Ruiter	2:35
6.	"Tropic Bird"	Ruiter	2:42

Side two
No.	Title	Composer	Length
1.	"Focus IV"	van Leer	3:55
2.	"Someone's Crying … What?"	Akkerman	3:18
3.	"All Together … Oh, That!"	Akkerman	3:40
4.	"No Hang Ups"	Paul Stoppelman	2:54
5.	"My Sweetheart"	Akkerman, van Leer	3:35
6.	"Father Bach"	Trad., arr. van Leer	1:30
Total length:			37:16

=== CD listing ===
Track listing of Japanese release from 16 December 2006.

1. "Mother Focus" (Jan Akkerman, Bert Ruiter, Thijs van Leer) – 3:04
2. "I Need a Bathroom" (Ruiter) – 3:03
3. "Bennie Helder" (van Leer) – 3:31
4. "Soft Vanilla" (Ruiter) – 3:03
5. "Hard Vanilla" (Ruiter) – 2:34
6. "Tropical Bird" (Ruiter) – 2:42
7. "Focus IV" (van Leer) – 3:56
8. "Someone's Crying . . . What?" (Akkerman) – 3:18
9. "All Together . . . Oh, That!" (Akkerman) – 3:41
10. "No Hang Ups" (Paul Stoppelman) – 2:55
11. "My Sweetheart" (Akkerman, van Leer) – 3:36
12. "Father Bach" (van Leer) – 1:34

== Personnel ==
Focus

- Thijs van Leer – Hammond organ, electric piano, grand piano, Solina String Ensemble, concert and alto flutes, voices, synthesizers, piano, saxophone on track 1 & 8, flute, non-lexical vocables (track 1)
- Jan Akkerman – guitar
- Bert Ruiter – bass guitar, vocals (track 2)
- David Kemper – drums (all tracks except 10)
- Colin Allen – drums (track 10)
- An unidentified session musician – percussion

== Charts ==
Chart (1975–1976)	Peak position
Australian Albums (Kent Music Report)	61
Norwegian Albums (VG-lista)	17
UK Albums (OCC)	23
US Billboard 200	152
