= Bobby Jacobs =

Dutch bassist, songwriter and producer (born 1965)

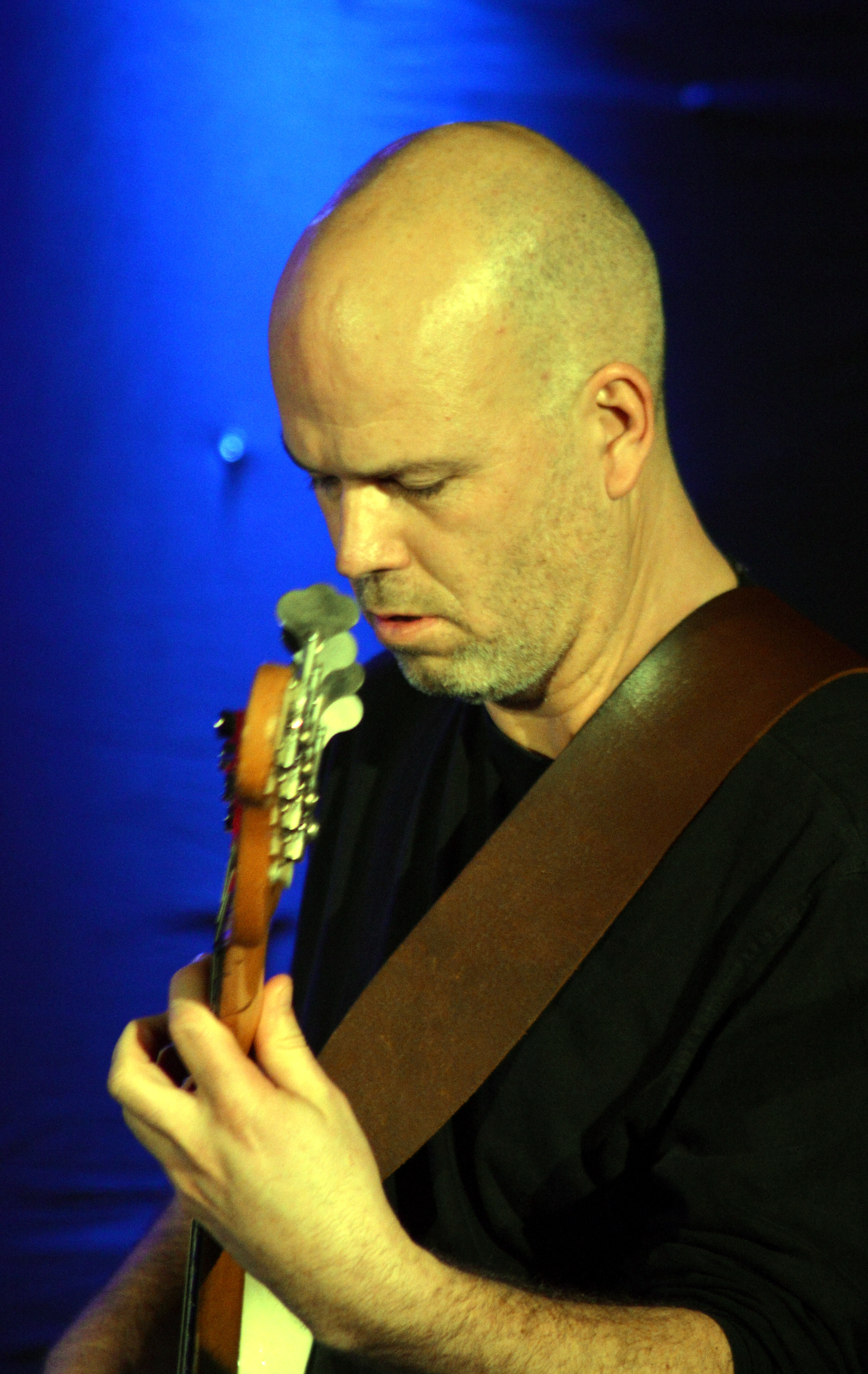
- Bobby Jacobs live with Focus in 2014

Background information
- Born: February 16, 1965 (age 61); Hilversum, Netherlands
- Genres: Progressive rock; jazz; classical; hard rock; instrumental rock
- Occupations: Musician, Composer, Producer
- Instruments: Bass, Keyboards

Bobby Jacobs (born 16 February 1965) is a Dutch bassist, songwriter and producer best known as the former bassist for the Dutch rock band Focus, from 2002 to December 2016.

== Biography ==
Jacobs was born in Hilversum, Netherlands. He is the second son of famed Dutch musician Ruud Jacobs and therefore the nephew of Pim Jacobs. Jacobs has two brothers, Jeroen and Roeland, and is the stepson of Thijs van Leer, the founding member of Focus. Jacobs was a member of van Leer's side bands Van Leer and Conxi, and Olivia.

From 2002 to December 2016, Jacobs was a member of Focus as their bassist as is featured on their studio albums Focus 8 (2002), Focus 9 / New Skin (2009), Focus X (2012), and Golden Oldies (2014). During his tenure with the band, Jacobs also served as their producer and was credited as a writer on "De Ti O De Me", "Sylvia's Stepson", "Aya-Yuppie-Hippy-Yee" and "Hoeratio". He was replaced by Dutch player Udo Pannekeet.

== Discography ==
with Focus

- Focus 8 (2002)
- Focus 9 / New Skin (2009)
- Focus X (2012)
- Golden Oldies (2014)
