= Moving Waves =

- Cover of the international edition under the title Moving Waves

Studio album by Focus
- Released: October 1971
- Recorded: 13 April – 14 May 1971
- Studios: Sound Techniques (London); Morgan (London)
- Genres: Progressive rock; jazz fusion; hard rock
- Length: 41:40
- Label: Imperial
- Producer: Mike Vernon

Focus chronology
Focus Plays Focus (1970)	Moving Waves (1971)	Focus 3 (1972)

Singles from Moving Waves
- 1. "Hocus Pocus" Released: June 1971; 2. "Tommy" Released: February 1972

Focus II (better known by its international title, Moving Waves) is the second studio album by Dutch progressive rock band Focus, released in October 1971 on Imperial Records. Following the departure of original bassist Martin Dresden and drummer Hans Cleuver in 1970, the band recruited Cyril Havermans and Pierre van der Linden, respectively, and prepared material for a new album. Recording took place in London in April and May 1971 with Mike Vernon as producer. The album features "Hocus Pocus", a hard rock song featuring keyboardist Thijs van Leer's yodelling, scat singing, and whistling, and "Eruption", a 22-minute track inspired by the opera Euridice by Italian composer Jacopo Peri.

The album was released to a mostly positive response and remains one of their most commercially successful albums, reaching No. 2 in the UK, No. 4 in the Netherlands, and No. 8 in the US. "Hocus Pocus" was released as a single in the Netherlands in June 1971, followed by its international release in 1973, where it reached No. 9 in the US and No. 20 in the UK. The album is certified gold by the Recording Industry Association of America for selling 500,000 copies in the US.

== Background ==
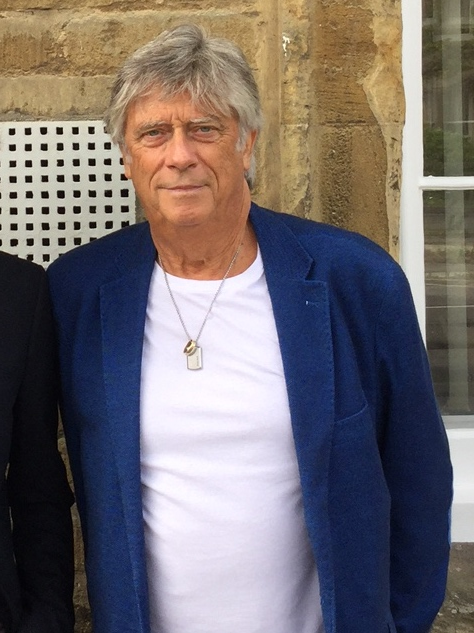
Producer Mike Vernon in 2017

Focus was formed in Amsterdam in 1969 by keyboardist, vocalist, and flautist Thijs van Leer, bassist Martin Dresden, drummer Hans Cleuver, and guitarist Jan Akkerman. After releasing their debut album Focus Plays Focus (1970), the group suffered a setback when Akkerman requested that van Leer fire Dresden and Cleuver so his former Brainbox bandmate, drummer Pierre van der Linden, could join the band. Van Leer reluctantly agreed, and the trio subsequently recruited bassist Cyril Havermans. After a series of gigs, the group travelled to London to record a follow-up album. Session took place from 13 April–14 May 1971 at Sound Techniques and Morgan Studios with Mike Vernon as their producer.

== Songs ==
"Hocus Pocus" is a rock song that features van Leer yodelling, eefing, scat singing, and whistling. The song was written as a rock parody, and it was recorded for the album as it lacked any "outright rock" tracks at that point. The group wanted to incorporate an element of humour in the track because they felt it was missing in the rock genre. "Le Clochard" is French for "Tramp" and is fully titled "Le Clochard (Bread)". It is a melancholic classical guitar piece by Akkerman with van Leer backing on Mellotron. "Janis" is another Akkerman-penned ballad and features van Leer on the flute. "Moving Waves", a piano and vocal solo by van Leer, features lyrics by Sufi singer, poet, and teacher Inayat Khan. "Focus II" is a classical-jazz fusion instrumental.

Side two contains the 23-minute track "Eruption", a loose rock adaptation of the tale of Orpheus and Euridice from the opera Euridice by Italian composer Jacopo Peri. The track is in fifteen distinct sections, and the suite opens with an uncredited melody from the opera L'Orfeo by Monteverdi. "Tommy" features a guitar solo and was named and written by Tom Barlage of the Dutch fusion band Solution. "Euridice" is a classical lied which segues into the Gregorian-inspired "Dayglow" and followed by van der Linden's drum solo, "Endless Road". The suite ends with a return to its opening themes.

== Release ==
Professional ratings
Review scores
Source	Rating
AllMusic	4/5 stars
MelodicMusic	5/5 stars

Moving Waves was released in October 1971 to mainly positive reception. It went on to peak at number 2 on the UK Albums Chart, number 8 on the US Billboard 200, and number 4 on the Dutch Album Top 100 chart.

The single "Hocus Pocus" peaked at number 9 on the Billboard Hot 100.

Moving Waves came in at number 24 in Q and Mojo's list of "40 Cosmic Rock Albums".

== Track listing ==
Side one
No.	Title	Writer(s)	Length
1.	"Hocus Pocus"	Thijs van Leer, Jan Akkerman	6:42
2.	"Le Clochard (Bread)"	Akkerman	2:01
3.	"Janis"	Akkerman, van Leer	3:09
4.	"Moving Waves"	van Leer, Inayat Khan	2:42
5.	"Focus II"	van Leer	4:00

Side two
No.	Title	Length
6.	"Eruption": 1. "Orfeus" (van Leer); 2. "Answer" (van Leer); 3. "Orfeus" (van Leer); 4. "Answer" (van Leer); 5. "Pupilla" (van Leer); 6. "Tommy" (Tom Barlage); 7. "Pupilla" (van Leer); 8. "Answer" (van Leer); 9. "The Bridge" (Akkerman); 10. "Euridice" (van Leer, Eelko Nobel); 11. "Dayglow" (van Leer); 12. "Endless Road" (Pierre van der Linden); 13. "Answer" (van Leer); 14. "Orfeus" (van Leer); 15. "Euridice" (van Leer, Nobel)"	22:35

== Personnel ==
Focus

- Thijs van Leer – Hammond organ, Mellotron, Harmonium, vocals (including yodeling, scat singing, whistling), soprano flute, alto flute, piano
- Jan Akkerman – acoustic and electric guitars, bass guitar
- Cyril Havermans – bass guitar, vocals on "Eruption"
- Pierre van der Linden – drums, percussion

Production

- Mike Vernon – producer
- Jerry Boys – engineer
- Dennis Kloeth – sleeve design (original pressing)
- Janos Barendsen – cover photograph

== Charts ==
Chart performance for Focus II
Chart (1971–1973)	Peak position
Australian Albums (Kent Music Report)	15
Canada Top Albums/CDs (RPM)	6
Dutch Albums (Album Top 100)	4
Finnish Albums (The Official Finnish Charts)	26
UK Albums (Official Charts)	2
US Billboard 200	8

== Certifications ==
Region	Certification	Certified units/sales
United Kingdom (BPI)	Gold	100,000^{^}
United States (RIAA)	Gold	500,000^{^}
^{^} Shipments figures based on certification alone.
