= House of the King =

- German picture sleeve

Single by Focus
- B-side: "Black Beauty"
- Released: January 1971
- Genre: Baroque pop
- Length: 2:18
- Songwriter(s): Jan Akkerman

"House of the King" is an instrumental by the Dutch rock band Focus. It was released as a single in January 1971 and reached No. 10 on the Dutch charts and sold well across Europe. In the UK, it was issued on both the group's first album, In And Out of Focus and the 1972 double album Focus 3.

The song is in a baroque pop style. It was written by guitarist Jan Akkerman and based on an improvised instrumental that the group performed after the plug was pulled on a concert in Majorca in June 1970 because they played over their allotted time. The recording features group leader Thijs van Leer on flute, which has led to it being compared to the work of Jethro Tull. Akkerman played acoustic guitar during the main section, and a brief electric guitar solo in the bridge. Unlike many other Focus songs, which featured extended instrumentals, it is less than two and a half minutes long.

Focus almost disbanded during 1970, after the song was recorded, but because of the commercial potential for "House of the King", they were persuaded by management to stay together, albeit with a different line-up. It was performed live as part of a one-off reunion set for Dutch television in 1990.

The track's commercial potential led to it being used as the theme tune for the 1970s ITV television show Don't Ask Me. It was also used as theme for the Steve Coogan comedy series Saxondale, which befitted the title character's role as a former roadie for rock bands. It has been cited by several sources as one of the best television theme tunes.

== Weekly charts ==
Chart (1971)	Peak position
Netherlands Single Top 100 Megacharts	10
Netherlands Dutch Top 40	14
Belgium (Flanders) Ultratop	27
Belgium (Wallonia) Ultratop	7
France SNEP	31
