= Hamburger Concerto =

Studio album by Focus
- Released: May 1974
- Recorded: January–March 1974
- Studio: Olympic Sound Studios
- Genres: Progressive rock; jazz fusion
- Length: 40:06
- Labels: Polydor, Atco
- Producer: Mike Vernon

Focus chronology
At the Rainbow (1973)	Hamburger Concerto (1974)	Mother Focus (1975)

Singles from Hamburger Concerto
- 1. "Harem Scarem" Released: April 1974

Professional ratings
Review scores
Source	Rating
Allmusic	4/5 stars

Hamburger Concerto is the fourth studio album by the Dutch progressive rock band Focus, released in May 1974. It peaked at No. 20 on the UK charts. The title track is based on Variations on a Theme by Haydn by Johannes Brahms. The composition also incorporates the first two verses of the Dutch Christmas carol O Kerstnacht, schoner dan de dagen at around 15 minutes, and the Third Quarter chime from the Westminster Quarters is quoted in the track's final seconds. The first track is based on a galliard of Joachim van den Hove, Delitiae Musicae.

== Track listing ==
=== Vinyl release, 1974 ===
Side one
No.	Title	Writer(s)	Length
1.	"Delitiæ Musicæ"	Traditional; arranged by Jan Akkerman	1:12
2.	"Harem Scarem"	Thijs van Leer	5:51
3.	"La Cathédrale de Strasbourg"	van Leer	4:59
4.	"Birth"	Akkerman	7:46

Side two
No.	Title	Length
1.	"Hamburger Concerto: I. Starter (Traditional; arranged by van Leer); II. Rare (Akkerman); III. Medium I (van Leer, Akkerman); IV. Medium II (Akkerman); V. Well Done (van Leer); VI. One for the Road (Akkerman)"	20:20

=== CD release, 1988 ===
No.	Title	Writer(s)	Length
1.	"Delitiæ Musicæ"	Jan Akkerman	1:13
2.	"Harem Scarem"	Thijs van Leer	5:52
3.	"La Cathédrale de Strasbourg"	van Leer	4:59
4.	"Birth"	Akkerman	7:46
5.	"Hamburger Concerto: I. Starter (Traditional; arranged by van Leer); II. Rare (Akkerman); III. Medium I (van Leer, Akkerman); IV. Medium II (Akkerman); V. Well Done (van Leer); VI. One for the Road (Akkerman)"		20:19
6.	"Early Birth"	Akkerman	2:54
Total length:			43:08

== Personnel ==
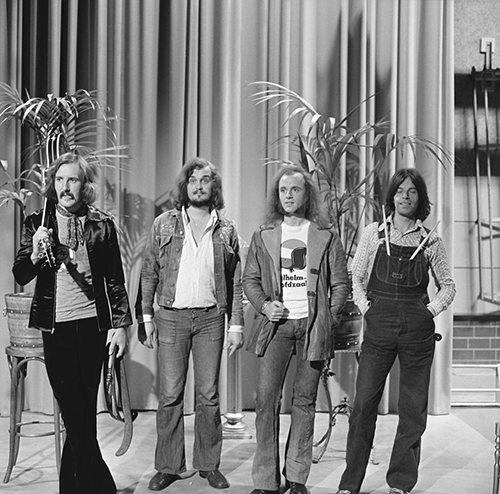
Focus in April 1974

Focus

- Thijs van Leer – Hammond organ, flute, piano, harpsichord, moog, ARP synthesizer, recorder, mellotron, accordion, pipe organ, the organ of St.Mary the Virgin, Barnes, vocals
- Jan Akkerman – guitars, lute, timpani, handclaps
- Bert Ruiter – bass guitar, autoharp, triangles, finger cymbals, bells, handclaps
- Colin Allen – drums, congas, tambourine, castanets, cabasa, wood block, gong, timpani, handclaps, flexatone, cuica

== Charts ==
Chart (1974)	Peak position
Australian Albums (Kent Music Report)	14
Canada Top Albums/CDs (RPM)	95
Dutch Albums (Album Top 100)	5
Norwegian Albums (VG-lista)	16
UK Albums (Official Charts)	20
US Billboard 200	66

== Certifications ==
Region	Certification	Certified units/sales
United Kingdom (BPI)	Silver	60,000^{^}
^{^} Shipments figures based on certification alone.
