= Focus Plays Focus =

Studio album by Focus
- Released: September 1970
- Recorded: January 1970
- Studios: Sound Techniques (Chelsea, London)
- Genre: Progressive rock
- Length: 33:30 (UK edition 35:50)
- Labels: Imperial (5C 054-24192)
- Producer: Hubert Terheggen

Focus chronology
Focus Plays Focus (1970)	Focus II (1971)

Focus Plays Focus is the first studio album by Dutch rock band Focus, released in September 1970 on Imperial Records. It is the only album recorded by the group's original line-up consisting of organist and vocalist Thijs van Leer, bassist Martijn Dresden, drummer Hans Cleuver, and guitarist Jan Akkerman. It was renamed In and Out of Focus for the international version of the album released in January 1971 which included their debut single "House of the King".

== Musical style ==
AllMusic's Richie Unterberger called the album "a fair collection of progressive rock tunes without a clear focus" and noted prominent influences from folk rock, blues, and classical music, as well as "occasional jazzy shadings".

== Track listing ==
=== Original release ===
Side one
No.	Title	Writer(s)	Length
1.	"Focus" (Instrumental)	Thijs van Leer	9:45
2.	"Why Dream"	van Leer, Erik Cleuver	3:57
3.	"Happy Nightmare"	van Leer, Martin Dresden, Mike Hayes	3:56

Side two
No.	Title	Writer(s)	Length
1.	"Anonymus"	van Leer, Jan Akkerman, Dresden, Hans Cleuver	7:00
2.	"Black Beauty"	van Leer, Cleuver	3:05
3.	"Sugar Island"	van Leer, Dresden, Jan Staal	3:03
4.	"Focus" (Vocal Version)	van Leer, Cleuver	2:44

=== 1971 reissue ===
Side one
No.	Title	Writer(s)	Length
1.	"Focus" (Instrumental)	van Leer, Cleuver	9:45
2.	"Why Dream"	van Leer, Cleuver	3:57
3.	"Happy Nightmare"	van Leer, Dresden, Hayes	3:56

Side two
No.	Title	Writer(s)	Length
1.	"Anonymus"	van Leer, Akkerman, Dresden	7:00
2.	"Black Beauty"	van Leer, Cleuver	3:05
3.	"Sugar Island"	van Leer, Dresden, Jan Staal	3:03
4.	"House of the King"	Akkerman	2:15

=== 1971 UK issue (Polydor 2344 003) ===
Side one
No.	Title	Writer(s)	Length
1.	"Focus" (Vocal)	van Leer, Cleuver	2:44
2.	"Black Beauty"	van Leer, Cleuver	3:05
3.	"Sugar Island"	van Leer, Dresden, Staal	3:56
4.	"Anonymous"	van Leer, Akkerman, Dresden	7:00
5.	"House of the King"	Akkerman	2:20

Side two
No.	Title	Writer(s)	Length
1.	"Happy Nightmare (Mescaline)"	van Leer, Dresden, Hayes	3:59
2.	"Why Dream?"	van Leer, Cleuver	3:57
3.	"Focus (instrumental)"	van Leer, Cleuver	9:45

== Personnel ==
Credits adapted from the album's 1970 liner notes.

Focus

- Thijs van Leer – lead vocals ("Why Dream," "Black Beauty," "Sugar Island," "Focus (Vocal)"), flute, Hammond organ, piano, electric piano, mellotron, harpsichord, vibraphone
- Jan Akkerman – guitars
- Martijn Dresden – bass guitar, trumpet, lead vocals ("Happy Nightmare"), backing vocals ("Why Dream," "Sugar Island")
- Hans Cleuver – drums, bongos, backing vocals ("Why Dream," "Black Beauty," "Sugar Island")
- Wouter Möller – cello ("Happy Nightmare")

Production

- Hubert Terheggen – production
- Jerry Boys – engineering

== Charts ==
Chart (1973)	Peak position
US Billboard 200	104
