= Focus (band) =

Dutch rock band

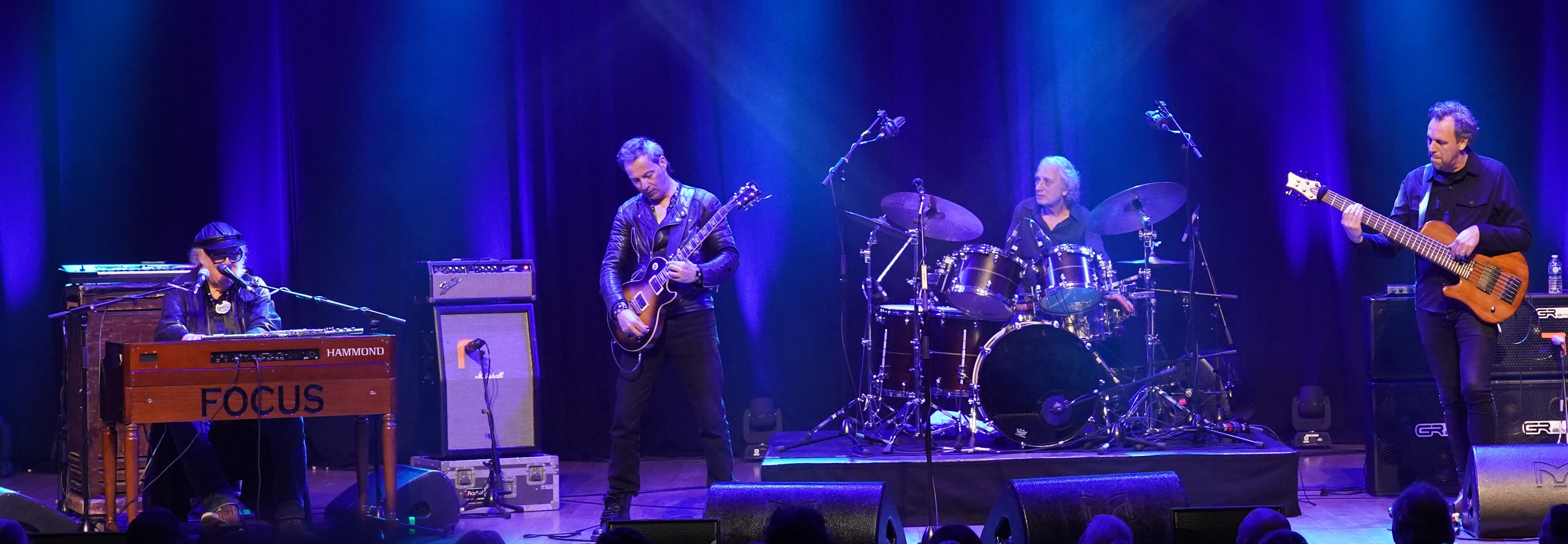
- Focus in 2024; Left to right: Thijs van Leer, Menno Gootjes, Pierre van der Linden and Udo Pannekeet

Background information
- Also known as: Trio Thijs van Leer
- Origin: Amsterdam, Netherlands
- Genres: Progressive rock; jazz fusion
- Years active: 1969–1978; 1990; 1997–1999; 2002–present
- Labels: Atco; Cherry Red; Eastworld; EMI; Imperial; In and Out of Focus Records; IRS; Musea; Sire; Polydor; Red Bullet; Vertigo
- Members: Thijs van Leer; Pierre van der Linden; Menno Gootjes; Udo Pannekeet
- Past members: See Band members
- Website: focustheband.co.uk

Focus is a Dutch progressive rock band formed in Amsterdam in 1969 by keyboardist, vocalist, and flautist Thijs van Leer, drummer Hans Cleuver, bassist Martijn Dresden, and guitarist Jan Akkerman. The band has undergone numerous formations in its history; since December 2016, it has comprised Van Leer, drummer Pierre van der Linden, guitarist Menno Gootjes, and bassist Udo Pannekeet. They have sold one million RIAA-certified albums in the United States.

After the addition of Akkerman to Van Leer's rock trio in late 1969, the band named themselves Focus and initially worked for a Dutch production of the rock musical Hair. Their debut album, Focus Plays Focus (1970), gained little attention but the follow-up, Moving Waves (1971), and its lead single "Hocus Pocus", earned the band international recognition. Their success continued with Focus 3 (1972) and Hamburger Concerto (1974), the former containing their second hit single, "Sylvia". After recording two albums with various musicians, including guitarist Phillip Catherine, singer P. J. Proby, and drummers Colin Allen, David Kemper, and Steve Smith, Focus dissolved in 1978. They briefly reunited in 1990 and 1997.

In 2002, Van Leer reformed Focus with a new line-up that saw Van der Linden rejoining the group in 2004. The albums Focus 8 (2002), Focus 9 / New Skin (2006), and Focus X (2012) were well received, and Focus continue to perform worldwide. Their most recent album is Focus 12 (2024). Focus remain one of the most successful and influential rock bands from the Netherlands.

== History ==
=== 1969–1970: Formation ===
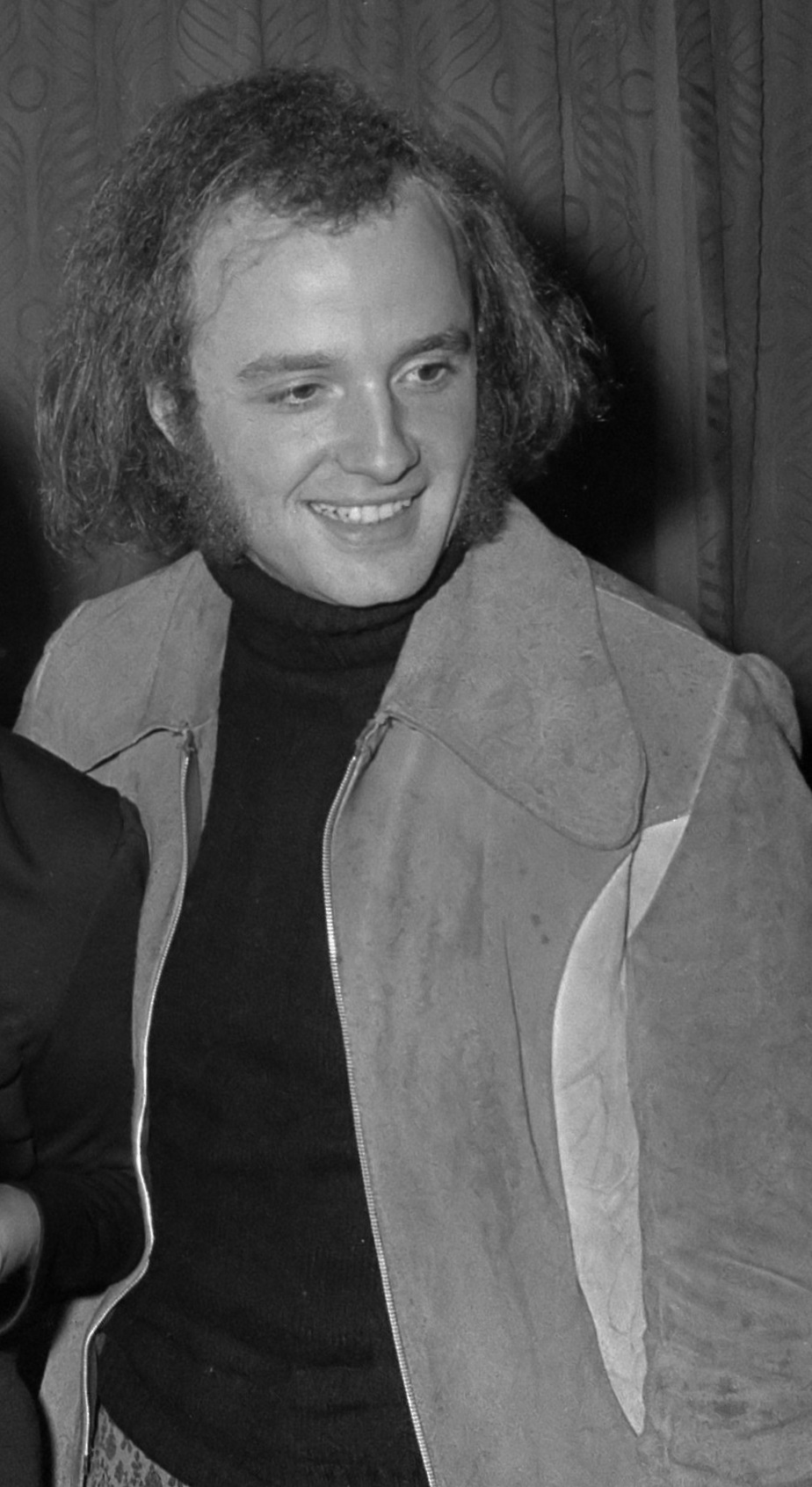
Thijs van Leer, the founding member of Focus, in 1971

Focus formed in mid-1969 by keyboardist, vocalist, and flautist Thijs van Leer, who recruited bass guitarist Martijn Dresden and drummer Hans Cleuver after he met them at sessions for the Jazz and Poetry radio program in Hilversum, Netherlands. The three went on to start a new three-piece band initially known as Thijs van Leer and the Rebaptised, playing a set formed mostly of cover songs by Traffic and original material mostly written by van Leer. In November 1969, during rehearsals at the theatre where van Leer performed as part of Ramses Shaffy's theatre group, they were joined by guitarist Jan Akkerman of the rock band Brainbox after Shaffy invited him to play with the trio. Van Leer later recalled the first try out session: "Jan came in and we jammed for hours, and it was really kicking". They then settled on the name Focus for the new band; Akkerman later said, "Focus is a Latin word that is the same in many languages. It means concentration, which is the meaning of what Focus does". Their first live gig as Focus followed at the Bird's Club in Rembrandtplein, and they soon secured a weekly residency playing two shows a night on two days. Early sets were mainly formed of covers, including "I Shall Be Released" by Bob Dylan, "A Whiter Shade of Pale" by Procol Harum and "Nights in White Satin" by The Moody Blues, mixed with original material, including van Leer's first song written with the group in mind, the instrumental "Focus".

In their search for more work and a steady income, Focus was chosen to play as part of the pit band for the Dutch production of the rock musical Hair produced by Welsh actor Victor Spinetti. They were invited to audition at the Victoria Ballroom, London after Dutch lyricist Lennaert Nijgh suggested them to Del Newman, the musical's director. Cast member Robin Lent claimed the production was suffering and Focus, taking part only for the money, "were also pretty rusty ... but this changed and everybody got into it". The show, launched in December 1969, involved six nightly performances a week and gave them space to rehearse in the afternoons for free and store their equipment. An album of the soundtrack featuring the band was recorded in February 1970 and released soon after by Polydor Records.

After Hair ended its run in June 1970, Focus declined an offer to tour the musical across the Netherlands for a year and a half and become a full-time band. They had picked up more local gigs and dates across the country by this time, and had performed their first international gigs in Belgium and Spain. Their weekly earnings from gigs, plus their earnings from Hair, had reached 400 guilders though Akkerman recalled the group failed to appreciate its value and were quick to spend it. To manage their finances more carefully, Cleuver was chosen to oversee their earnings and expenses.

=== 1970–1971: Debut album, "House of the King", and line-up change ===
In 1970, Focus reached contact with Hubert Terheggen, director of Radio-Tele-Music Belgium-Holland, a music publishing division of Radio Luxembourg, through connections with Dresden's father. Terheggen enjoyed their music and signed them to his production company, secured deals with music publishers worldwide, and booked studio time for them to record their first album, which took place in January 1970 at Sound Techniques in Chelsea, London during time off from Hair. The result was Focus Plays Focus, better known as its international release title In and Out of Focus, with Terheggen credited as producer and Jerry Boys the engineer. A mix of pop-oriented songs and instrumentals were recorded for the album; van Leer felt the vocals suffered as a result of singing English lyrics with a foreign accent, which inspired the group to become stronger instrumentally.

After recording Focus Plays Focus, the band struggled to find a label willing to release it. Their fortunes changed once they had recorded "House of the King", an instrumental by Akkerman with different accounts of its origin. Focus biographer Peet Johnson gives the general consensus that it was inspired by their appearance at the Barbarela de Conjuntos music contest in Mallorca on 11 June 1970, where in the final round, their rendition of Concierto de Aranjuez by Joaquín Rodrigo ran over the 15-minute time limit, causing their plugs to be pulled. Focus proceeded to retaliate with van Leer playing the flute to the audience as a distraction while the rest of the group trashed the dressing room, after which they were arrested and spent a night in jail. Van Leer claims Akkerman came up with the track the day after their arrest, but the guitarist said he wrote it "on a mountain, with a beautiful Spanish stewardess ... in about five minutes". Focus recorded it without management's permission in one evening at Heemstede, yet it reached staff at Imperial Records who thought it was strong enough as a hit single and signed the group.

Focus Plays Focus was released in September 1970, eight months after it was recorded. "Why Dream" and "Happy Nightmare" were released as their first single in the Netherlands. The album saw an American release in October by Sire Records, who had secured the rights to the band's international distribution, with "House of the King" added to the track listing. Prior to signing Focus, Sire founder Seymour Stein had flown to the Netherlands to see the band perform: "Without a doubt they were the most original band I had ever heard". Though the album received little commercial attention it earned Focus their first Edison Award, and the January 1971 release of "House of the King" went to number 10 on the home chart.

Late in 1970, Akkerman had become increasingly unhappy with Cleuver and Dresden as a rhythm section and missed his former Brainbox bandmate, drummer Pierre van der Linden. He thought the pair struggled to incorporate their own identity or musicianship into the music. Akkerman then presented an ultimatum to van Leer by threatening to quit unless he asked Cleuver and Dresden to leave. Van Leer refused to part ways with his co-founders and instead told Akkerman to leave, which increased tension between the two as they were often at odds with each other. Cleuver sensed panic from Imperial as it knew "House of the King" would be a hit and wanted van Leer and Akkerman to stay together. The situation reached Terheggen, who asked Yde de Jong to become Focus's manager if he could reunite the band. After six weeks of driving to both members' homes to negotiate, van Leer agreed to fire Cleuver and Dresden and joined Akkerman, van der Linden, and newcomer bassist Cyril Havermans on the condition that the group continue as Focus.

With the new line-up secured, Stein convinced English producer Mike Vernon to witness the band perform in the Netherlands in late 1970. Vernon was not so impressed with their first album, but enjoyed them as a live act: "I couldn't stop talking or thinking about them! They were formidable ... the power of Jan and Thijs alone gave me heart palpitations". Vernon subsequently agreed to produce their next studio album.

=== 1971–1972: Moving Waves and breakthrough ===
Following rehearsals at Groeneveld Castle in Baarn, the band recorded Focus II, better known by its international title Moving Waves, in April and May 1971 at Sound Techniques and Morgan Studios, London. It showcased the band exploring progressive rock with jazz fusion and classical music elements with extended pieces and lengthy solos. Akkerman changed his sound, moving from a Gretsch White Falcon to a 1957 Gibson Les Paul Custom which enabled him to "'sing' on the guitar" to compensate for the group's weak vocals. Its opening track, "Hocus Pocus", became one of the band's best known tracks, featuring a recognisable rock guitar riff and van Leer's yodelling, whistling, and nonsensical vocals that developed through an improvised jam session. Akkerman wrote "Janis" as a tribute to Janis Joplin, and its closer, "Eruption", is a 23-minute multi-part track inspired by the operas Orfeo ed Euridice by Christoph Willibald Gluck and L'Orfeo by Claudio Monteverdi, combining rock, jazz and classical influences.

Released in October 1971, Moving Waves became the band's international breakthrough, reaching number 2 in the UK, number 4 in the Netherlands, and number 8 in the US. The album earned Focus a Conamus Export Award, their second Edison Award, and gold certifications in the three aforementioned countries; the US award was issued in 1973 for selling 500,000 copies. Its success was helped by the release of "Hocus Pocus" as a single, released in the Netherlands in July 1971 which peaked at number 12 and exposed the band to a new audience. It peaked at number 20 in the UK in January 1973.

Between the recording and release of Moving Waves, Focus underwent further line-up changes. Shortly before a tour of France in July 1971, Van der Linden temporarily left the band after he found out Van Leer and Akkerman would get paid more than himself. He was replaced by Akkerman's younger brother, the 19-year-old Jacob "Cocky" Akkerman, before the rift was sorted and Van der Linden resumed on the drums at its conclusion. This was followed by Havermans' departure in September 1971, having handed in his notice in late June. He wished to sing on more tracks but was unable to do so within the confines of the group and pursued a solo career. The remaining members would reunite with the bassist in the US in early 1973 to play on his first solo album, Cyril. Focus found their new bassist in Bert Ruiter, who had previously rehearsed with van der Linden prior to a gig in Texel in June 1971, and went on to see the band live around ten times thereafter. He was invited by the drummer to a tryout session, after which he became a full-time member.

Focus resumed as a live act in September 1971; among their first gigs with Ruiter was in Rotterdam as part of the European Newport Jazz Festival on 29 October. Towards the end of the year, de Jong organised the band's first UK tour, a 15-gig trek between 15 February–10 March 1972, to increase exposure and record sales. Van Leer felt insecure about the tour at first and expressed the lack of courage from the group when they compared themselves to other popular UK rock acts. They arrived in the UK during a period of nationwide energy shortages, yet de Jong resolved the issue by having Focus tour with their own power generator. Despite receiving little money for their performances, they received radio airplay on BBC Radio 1, earned positive reviews from critics, and gained new fans. Akkerman recalled the attendance of the gigs "were packed because it was probably the only thing that was going on". On 28 May 1972, Focus were booked to play the Lincoln Festival for an estimated 40,000 people, but the band arrived too late for their spot and were unable to reschedule, leaving them furious at the missed opportunity. Two days later, Focus made their British television debut with a pre-recorded performance of excerpts of "Eruption" and "Hocus Pocus" on the BBC music show The Old Grey Whistle Test. In the following month they were voted Brightest Hope by readers of Melody Maker and Best New Talent by readers of New Musical Express.

=== 1972–1974: Focus 3 and Hamburger Concerto ===
The band spent four days at Olympic Studios in Barnes, London in July 1972 recording their third album, Focus 3. They had written a considerable amount of material by this time which led to the decision to make a double album, mostly by van Leer and Akkerman. Focus 3 saw the group produce short and extended pieces, including the three-minute instrumental "Sylvia" and the group devised, 26-minute "Anonymous II" that devotes a solo spot for each member, and the addition of "House of the King". Upon its release in November 1972, the album went to number one in the Netherlands for one week, number 6 in the UK, and number 35 in the US. "Sylvia" was released as a single and reached number 4 in the UK in January 1973, the week after "Hocus Pocus" reached its peak on the same chart. This marked the first time in a decade that a band had two concurrent songs without lyrics in the UK top 40.

To support the album, Focus began their largest tour since their formation with spots at the Reading Festival on 12 August 1972 followed by the Melody Maker Poll Awards show at The Oval, London on 30 September. This was followed by an exhaustive 31-date UK tour in 36 days that included their return appearance on The Old Grey Whistle Test on 12 December which caused a surge in interest for their records; host Bob Harris said the show was inundated with calls and letters about the band and Polydor's record plant printed nothing but Focus for ten days in order to meet demand. A performance of "Sylvia" from the Marquee Club, London aired on the BBC's Top of the Pops show. After a sell out UK tour in January 1973 that spanned 24 days, Focus completed their first of three North American tours in 1973 from February to April, supporting various acts including Gentle Giant, Frank Zappa and Yes. Upon their return, they toured the UK once more which included two sold-out shows at the Rainbow Theatre, London in May 1973 which aired on BBC television.

In early May 1973, Focus returned to Olympic Studios at Vernon's request and recorded a new cut of "Hocus Pocus" titled "Hocus Pocus II", released exclusively for the American market. Later in the month, the band retreated to Chipping Norton Recording Studios, Oxfordshire to record a fourth studio album. Akkerman had expressed a wish to put down "great ideas" he had written over the past year, but extensive touring had left the band physically and mentally exhausted which reduced their eagerness to write and record new group material. Vernon recalled Akkerman's reluctance to take part in the sessions which to him, "led to the final dissolving of the Akkerman/van Leer partnership". Around 40 minutes of songs was eventually recorded, yet the pair refused to co-operate and recorded their parts without the other present. Vernon later called this period as "probably the worst ten days I've ever spent in a studio". As a new studio album could not be released, Vernon took the recording from the Rainbow Theatre concerts and released it as a live album, At the Rainbow. The album went to number 23 in the UK in October 1973. The band went on to receive a Billboard Trendsetter Award for their success after notching up two gold albums, combining sales of one million copies sold in the US, and one gold single. Recordings from the Chipping Norton sessions remained unreleased, rearranged years later, or included in the collection of previously unreleased Focus studio recordings Ship of Memories, in 1976.

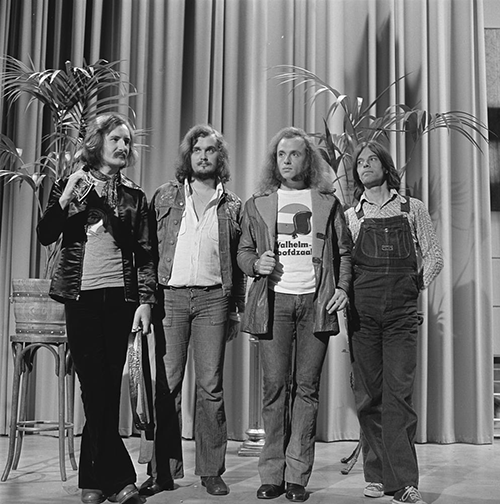
The 1973–1975 line-up on the Dutch television show Top Pop in April 1974, with drummer Colin Allen on far right.

Upon their return from their second North American tour from June to September 1973, the band returned to Groeneveld Castle for rehearsals. Van der Linden failed to turn up, and the group soon learned of his decision to quit the band. Van Leer claimed rock music was a step in the wrong direction for the drummer, who wished to pursue jazz. Vernon suggested English players Mitch Mitchell, Aynsley Dunbar, and Colin Allen as replacements. Allen was the only one available as his previous group, Stone the Crows had recently broken up. He flew to the Netherlands to meet the band and after a successful try out session, he joined the group. "It all happened pretty quickly ... I fitted in." His arrival came eight days before the band's upcoming North American tour was to start.

From January to March 1974, Focus recorded Hamburger Concerto at Olympic Studios with Vernon. Recording was met with growing tension, with van Leer, Ruiter and Allen working together during the day and Akkerman recording his parts in the evening. The album presents further classical music influences, opening with "Delitæ Musicæ", a lute piece Akkerman adapted from Delitæ Musicæ Cantiones by Dutch composer Joachim van den Hove. It closes with a six-part, 20-minute conceptual title track inspired by Akkerman once eating a hamburger while watching cartoons at his hotel room in New York City and was put down in basic form during the 1973 Chipping Norton sessions. Released in May 1974, Hamburger Concerto peaked at number 5 in the Netherlands and number 20 in the UK. Van Leer claimed it was the band's "First proper work. It has strength and purpose", and Vernon later said the album and Moving Waves were the most rewarding on a second listen. Akkerman later felt the album suffered as his position in the group had weakened with van der Linden gone and claimed van Leer "broke up the tandem I had with Pierre rhythmically". A single version of "Harem Scarem" was released but did not chart in the UK.

Focus toured Hamburger Concerto from March 1974, starting with dates across Europe, including two in London that were filmed for broadcast on the BBC2 and US television music series In Concert. They began their first tour of Japan and Australia in June, followed by an appearance at the Reading Festival in August and the start of their fourth North American tour in September. They were featured on the nationally syndicated Don Kirshner's Rock Concert show aired live from Long Beach, California, giving the band widespread exposure. At one concert during the US leg, van Leer and Akkerman noticed a young Michael Jackson sitting in the front row. Upon their return, the band completed a 24-day tour of Europe and two compilation albums were released, The Story of Focus and Masters of Rock.

=== 1975–1978: Mother Focus, Focus con Proby, and disbanding ===
In 1975, the band gathered at Morgan Studios, Brussels to rehearse and record Mother Focus. They reunited with Terheggen to oversee the project as executive producer, but the group found themselves without a collective direction; van Leer put its failure down to the band's recording contract which required them to produce one studio album each year, the pressures of touring had affected the songs, and a lack of overall interest from the band. In addition, Akkerman continued to record parts separately, showing no sign of an improvement in his relationship with van Leer. Ruiter became a more prominent songwriter and contributed more ideas than he had on previous Focus albums; he and Allen, after recording "I Need a Bathroom", began to experiment with a drum machine to aid their ideas, but the drummer recalled Akkerman got angry, shouted at him, and tossed the machine across the room. Allen was fired the next day, not knowing who made the decision. He was required to pay what he owed to the group during his tenure which amounted to roughly £10,000, using his earnings from royalties to pay much of it. Despite the problems, he "will always remain proud to have been a member". In May 1975, at the suggestion of their studio engineer, American drummer David Kemper was brought in to complete the rest of the album.

Released in October 1975, Mother Focus saw Focus depart from their classical and jazz-influenced sound towards shorter, commercially accessible songs with middle of the road influences and little room for improvisation and jamming they were known for. Akkerman argued with van Leer and Ruiter over the group's change in musical direction, deeming it "typical American music". The album went to number 23 in the UK, and received mostly negative reviews from critics. During plans for their upcoming tour Akkerman refused to perform the album's music, thinking it was not strong enough. To solve the issue, he and van Leer returned to Morgan Studios and put down "Red Sky at Night" and "Avondrood", the latter featuring the two singing in Dutch. After Kemper left when recording was complete, Akkerman wished van der Linden to return, thinking he was responsible "for at least 40%" of the band's success and said he "wouldn't leave Focus" with him on the drums. However, van Leer and Ruiter did not share the same enthusiasm over van der Linden's return. Nevertheless, Focus returned to Australia and Japan in May and June 1975 for a series of sold out dates, yet reviewers of the gigs noticed the lack of cohesiveness than before. During the Scandinavian tour that followed, a gig at the Ullevaal Stadium, Oslo during the Ragnarok Festival was met with Akkerman and van der Linden jamming with "little adherence to the repertoire" that was taken as a protest to playing the same material night after night. Matters turned for the worse after van Leer and Ruiter refused to have van der Linden re-record the drums for a single release of "Crackers", causing the drummer to quit a second time. With van der Linden gone, Focus cancelled a proposed 34-date UK tour and brought back Kemper during subsequent rehearsals after a desperate plea from de Jong. The "House of the King"/"Avondrood" single was released in 1976; the latter track originally appeared on a Dutch compilation album. The two appear in instrumental form on Ship of Memories.

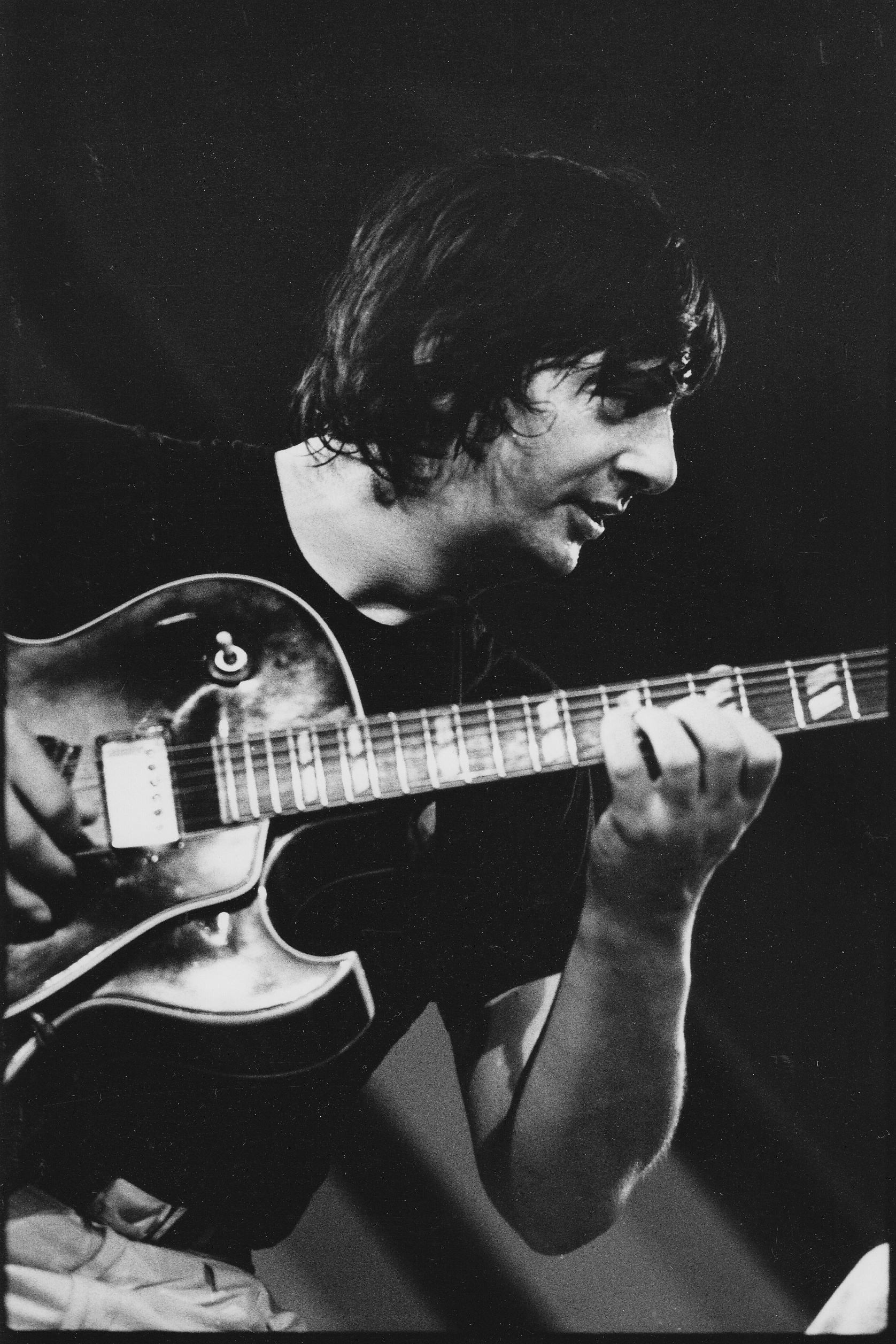
Phillip Catherine replaced Akkerman in 1976

In February 1976, two and a half days before the group's arrival to the UK for a tour, van Leer asked Akkerman to leave Focus over his disagreements with the music they were rehearsing and the decision not to have van der Linden return on the drums. Akkerman had grown tired of playing the same songs on stage, "It felt like I was in a straitjacket. There was still a lot of improvisation but even this had become planned". Van Leer said he wished to write "happy" music and move from "our European minor chords". Rather than have the tour cancelled, van Leer decided to proceed, with Kemper having seven days to arrive from the US and learn the new material and Akkerman at home with illness. In the guitarist's absence, van Leer met Belgian guitarist Philip Catherine and the two played a jam session that van Leer enjoyed. Akkerman disliked a song that the group had rehearsed about him soon after, which led to van Leer asking him to leave the next day. After Catherine agreed to step in, the group rehearsed for fifty hours without sleep; van Leer spent the evening prior the first gig mapping out the guitar parts on paper which Catherine followed on stage. Refunds were offered to concert goers as news of Akkerman's departure was not made public until after the tour had begun, which ended in March 1976. Dutch guitarist Eef Albers later joined Focus. A handful of scattered gigs were performed through 1977 and 1978 with American drummer Richard James on call out whenever they secured a booking.

After van Leer signed a deal with EMI in April 1976 to record a new Focus album, work did not begin until late 1977 when the band faced potential legal action if they did not release something. Recording took place in December 1977 at EMI Studios in Haarlem, Amsterdam with van Leer, Ruiter, Albers, and a returning Catherine, who was contractually required to perform. Van Leer turned to ideas that he had developed with his wife Roselie during Focus tours, but felt neither his or Ruiter's voices were strong enough to sing on. In the search for a suitable lead vocalist de Jong, a friend of American singer P. J. Proby, rang his Netherlands-based manager and invited him to the studio, thinking his vocals would replace Akkerman's lyrical playing. Van Leer was sceptical as Proby was not familiar with the band and the singer was going through a period of heavy alcohol abuse. Upon Proby's arrival, Albers recalled: "He drank Four Roses whiskey the whole day, so much so that the nearest liquor store was soon sold out ... he always had the intention to run away". Proby interpreted the jazz-rock influenced songs as he felt, attempting "to meet them half-way between jazz and rock". James's drumming was unsuitable for the lighter material, so van Leer brought in future Journey drummer, American Steve Smith. Following the release of Focus con Proby in February 1978, which ignored the UK market, the album received negative reviews. Cleuver, then van Leer's manager, later called it "simply shameful". After a handful of gigs in the Netherlands, which concluded with a show in Terneuzen in August 1978 with James on the drums, van Leer ended Focus.

=== 1983−1999: Reunions ===
In 1983, Akkerman agreed to the idea of reuniting with van Leer and record new music, as suggested by his management. Van Leer immediately accepted the invitation and went on to play the synthesiser on "Headbanger", a track for Akkerman's solo album From the Basement (1984). After this initial collaboration, an executive at Phonogram Records suggested the pair work on an album of re-recorded Focus songs with English producer Trevor Horn, but it fell through. They subsequently signed a recording contract with Vertigo Records, which required the two to record as a duo, as opposed to Focus. During the recording, producer Ruud Jacobs was brought in to supervise due to the length of time taken to finalise tracks. Engineer Theo Balijon claimed Jacobs cut corners and pushed for the strongest tracks to be completed quickly to save production costs, which "unintentionally increased the animosity between Jan and Thijs". Around 30 tracks were completed with several additional musicians in 1984. Focus was released in March 1985 and reached number 33 in the Netherlands. The pair followed the album with promotional videos and a local four-date tour.

In 1988, EMI acquired the rights to the band's back catalogue and reissued their albums on CD for the first time.

In 1990, van Leer, Akkerman, van der Linden, and Ruiter reunited for a live gig, marking their first performance together since 1975. The four played a 40-minute set at the Americahal in Apeldoorn on 20 April that was broadcast as part of the Goud van Oud television special. It came about when producer Frans Meijer asked Akkerman to perform a gig with the group, and the fact that the guitarist's manager had not seen the band play in the 1970s. After the group agreed to participate, they rehearsed for four hours in Wijchen several days prior to the concert. Ruiter said they "went very well"; van Leer said it was "fantastic". Following the concert van Leer was keen to formally restart Focus with Akkerman, but the latter resisted. On 17 May 1990 the group, minus Akkerman, mimed a performance of "House of the King" on Service Salon on AVRO-TV. They had planned to perform "Hocus Pocus" with Akkerman, but the guitarist declined to take part. Van Leer and Akkerman shared the stage once more in 1993, performing mostly Akkerman solo songs at the North Sea Jazz Festival.

In 1997, van Leer reformed Focus with Cleuver and Ruiter returning on drums and bass, respectively, and 21-year-old Dutch guitarist Menno Gootjes who was studying at the Rotterdam Conservatory. The four made their live debut at the Hockey Club in Mill, Netherlands, on 30 August. They performed additional shows in the Netherlands, but disagreements between van Leer and Ruiter over material intended for an official release effectively split up the group, in 1999.

=== 2001–2009: Reformation, Focus 8, and Focus 9 ===
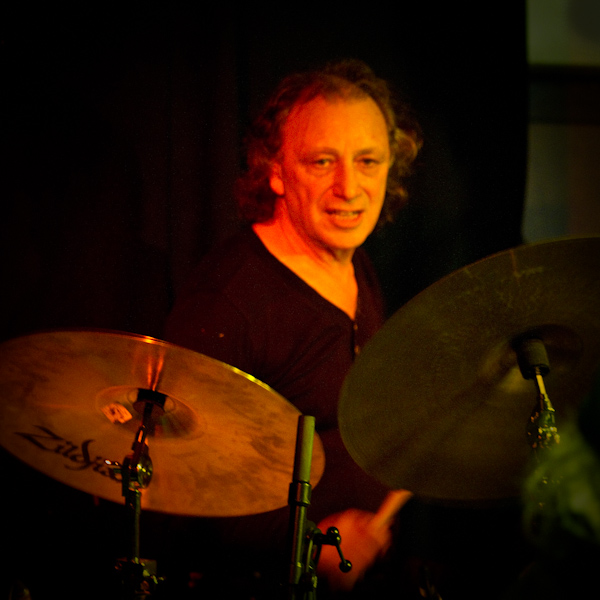
Drummer Pierre van der Linden rejoined Focus in 2004

In 2001, van Leer was invited to a session by his stepson and bassist Bobby Jacobs, who was rehearsing with guitarist Jan Dumée and drummer Ruben van Roon. Jacobs and van Roon was former members of van Leer's side project Conxi, and Dumée had attended school with Jacobs and Gootjes. To van Leer's surprise, he found out the three had been rehearsing Focus songs from the 1970s. The sessions led to the group's decision to perform live as a Focus tribute band named Hocus Pocus "just for fun, nothing too serious". After some well received gigs in the Netherlands, the group resumed the Focus name and acquired Willem Hubers as their new manager and booking agent which led to several offers to perform worldwide. Focus 8 was recorded between February and July 2002; van Roon left soon after due to personal circumstances. He was replaced by drummer Bert Smaak. Released on Musea Records in late 2002, it received critical praise and was supported with a world tour in 2002 and 2003.

In the autumn of 2004, Smaak had left the group and replaced by a returning van der Linden. Van Leer was particularly happy about his return, and stated that their friendship was better than it had been in the 1970s. In July 2006, Dumée was replaced by guitarist Niels van der Steenhoven. This line-up recorded Focus 9 / New Skin, released in September 2006 by Red Bullet Records.

=== 2010–present: Focus X, Focus 11, 50th anniversary, and Focus 12 ===
In May 2010, Nike included "Hocus Pocus" as the main theme in its 2010 FIFA World Cup commercial, Write the Future. The advert aired on television worldwide which generated renewed interest in the band and led to "Hocus Pocus" entering the UK Singles Chart at number 57. In late 2010, Gootjes rejoined the band as a replacement to a departing van der Steenhoven. In 2011, American rapper J. Cole sampled "Hocus Pocus" in his song "Blow Up", which is featured in the game MLB 11: The Show.

The band released their eleventh studio album Focus X, featuring cover art by Roger Dean, in November 2012. On 14 April 2014, the band released Golden Oldies on their own label, In and Out of Focus Records. It is a collection of re-recorded versions of Focus songs. In 2016, the band released Focus 8.5 / Beyond the Horizon. It is credited to "Focus and Friends featuring Marvio Ciribelli", and was recorded during gaps in their 2005 South American tour with Brazilian musicians.

In December 2016, Udo Pannekeet replaced Jacobs on bass. Focus performed at their second Cruise to the Edge event in February 2017, third in 2018, and fourth in 2019. The line-up included Dumée returning on guitar after Gootjes was too ill to perform.

In November 2018, Focus released their fourteenth studio album Focus 11 to coincide with their 20-date UK tour. The album was available at each venue which was followed by its full release on 25 January 2019, via Cherry Red Records.

In November 2020, a box set containing new remasters of the band's albums from 1970 to 1976, with previously unreleased audio and video material, entitled 50 Years: Anthology 1970–1976, was released by Red Bullet Productions to commemorate the band's fiftieth anniversary. This was followed in June 2021 by the release of Focus 50, a set featuring live material recorded in 2017 in Rio de Janeiro and a disc entitled Completely Focused, containing studio re-recordings of "Focus 1" through "Focus 12".

Former bassist Bert Ruiter died on 22 March 2022, aged 75.

On 28 May 2024, the band released single "Fjord Focus" for Focus 12, which itself was released on 5 July.

On 12th October 2025, WedgeView Music released "The Focus Symphony" Performed by the Antwerp Philharmonic Orchestra, bringing the works of Focus into orchestral form.

== Band members ==
Current members

- Thijs van Leer – keyboards, flute, vocals (1969–1978, 1990, 1993–1995, 1997–1999, 2001–present)
- Pierre van der Linden – drums, percussion (1971–1973, 1975, 1990, 2004–present)
- Menno Gootjes – guitar, backing vocals (1997–1999, 2010–present)
- Udo Pannekeet – bass (2016–present)

== Discography ==
Studio albums

- Focus Plays Focus (1970; also known as In and Out of Focus)
- Focus II (1971; also known as Moving Waves)
- Focus 3 (1972)
- Hamburger Concerto (1974)
- Mother Focus (1975)
- Ship of Memories (1976)
- Focus con Proby (1978)
- Focus (1985) (as Jan Akkerman & Thijs Van Leer)
- Focus 8 (2002)
- Focus 9 / New Skin (2006)
- Focus X (2012)
- Focus 8.5 / Beyond the Horizon (2016)
- Focus 11 (2018)
- Focus 12 (2024)
