= Hocus Pocus (song) =

1973 single by Focus

Single by Focus

from the album Moving Waves
- B-side: "Janis"
- Released: June 1971 (Netherlands); October 1971 (UK); February 1973 (US, Canada)
- Recorded: 1971; re-recorded 1972
- Genre: Progressive rock; hard rock; heavy metal
- Length: 6:42 (album version); 3:18 (single edit); 3:25 (re-recording: "Hocus Pocus 2", "Hocus Pocus II")
- Label: Imperial (NL); Polydor (DE, UK); Blue Horizon (UK); Sire (US, CA)
- Songwriters: Thijs van Leer, Jan Akkerman
- Producer: Mike Vernon

Official audio
- "Hocus Pocus" on YouTube

"Hocus Pocus" is a song by the Dutch rock band Focus, written by keyboardist, flutist, and vocalist Thijs van Leer and guitarist Jan Akkerman. It was recorded and released in 1971 as the opening track of their second studio album Moving Waves. An edited version was released as a single (with "Janis" as the B-side) on the Imperial, Polydor and Blue Horizon labels in Europe in 1971, but failed to chart in that year outside of the Netherlands (NL No. 10).

Buoyed by a live performance on The Old Grey Whistle Test in December 1972 and a subsequent British club tour, the song rose to No. 20 on the UK singles chart in late January 1973. In the US, the song peaked at No. 9 on the Billboard Hot 100 and No. 4 on the Cash Box Top 100.

The song was given new life in the new millennium, when it became the musical signature of the Nike "Write the Future" advertising campaign, shown during the 2010 FIFA World Cup. That year the single re-entered the UK chart at No. 57 and on the Dutch chart at No. 48.

== Description ==
"Hocus Pocus" was described as "the bludgeoning guitar riff ... broken up (or held together) by whistles, yodels, flutes and all manner of musical graffiti." Another reviewer wrote that "it amounts to ... a modern day 'Teddy Bear’s Picnic' without a let-up". Akkerman himself has said that it "was a send-up of ourselves ... all that serious Monteverdian fantasy." In NME in May 1973 Akkerman said that it was “just a send-up of those rock groups”.

The song takes the form of a rondo, consisting of alternation between a powerful rock chord riff with short drum solos and then varied solo "verses" (in the original all performed by Thijs van Leer) which include yodeling, organ playing, accordion, scat singing, flute riffs, and whistling. The single version is significantly edited from the album version.

"Hocus Pocus 2" is a slightly faster version with some funk elements and rhythms added. It was released as a single in its own right in Europe and was the B-side to the North American release of "Hocus Pocus". When performing live, Focus would play "Hocus Pocus" even faster.

== Release ==
The song was released in 1971, and reached No. 12 in the Netherlands. A new version, "Hocus Pocus 2", was released in 1973, and this reached No. 9.

In the US and Canada, the song was released as a single on the Sire Records label in 1973. A different recording, a faster version of the song, titled "Hocus Pocus 2" or "Hocus Pocus II", appeared on the B-side of the original single edit in these territories. It was released in the compilation album Dutch Masters (1969–73) by Sire Records in 1975, and it was later added as a bonus track on the CD release of the 1976 compilation album Ship of Memories, where the producer, Mike Vernon, also mentions it in his booklet notes as the US single version.

== Chart performance ==
=== Weekly charts ===
Hocus Pocus

Chart (1971–1973)	Peak position
Australia (Kent Music Report)	15
Canadian Singles Chart	18
Netherlands (Dutch Top 40)	10
Dutch Top 30	12
UK Singles Chart	20
US Billboard Hot 100	9
US Cash Box Top 100	4

Hocus Pocus 2

Chart (1973)	Peak position
Netherlands (Dutch Top 40)	9
Netherlands (Single Top 100)	9
West Germany (GfK)	45

Chart (2010)	Peak position
Dutch Singles Chart	48
UK Singles Chart	57

=== Year-end charts ===
Chart (1973)	Rank
Australia	143
Canada	152
US Billboard Hot 100	69
US Cash Box Top 100	58

== Cover versions ==
- In 1984 the song was covered by California based punk band The Vandals on their When in Rome Do as The Vandals album.
- In 1993 the song was covered instrumentally by guitarist Gary Hoey.
- In 1997 the song was covered by British violinist Vanessa Mae on her album Storm.
- In 1999 the song was covered by German heavy metal band Helloween on their Metal Jukebox album.
- In 2006 the song was covered by Iron Maiden as a B-side on their European DVD single "Different World".

== Use in media ==
- The song has also been used in the British motoring show Top Gear during one of The Stig's power laps, on series 6 episode 1, testing a Mercedes-Benz CLS55 AMG; as the exit music on the second series of the BBC TV sitcom Saxondale; in the 1994 film The Stoned Age; in a 2008 McDonald's commercial featuring the website Line Rider; in a 2010 Nike football World Cup advertisement titled "Write the Future"; in the third season episode of My Name Is Earl entitled "Early Release", when Earl Hickley (Jason Lee) is locked in solitary confinement; and in the 2008 Supernatural season 3 episode "Ghostfacers"; for the chase scene early in the first episode of Beyond Paradise 2023.
- The song was used in the series 1 episode "Chris" in the Channel 4 teen drama Skins. During a scene where Chris Miles (Joe Dempsie) tries to sell a CD player for pizza, the song can be heard playing in the background while Chris and Sid Jenkins (Mike Bailey) are about to get kicked out of a music shop, the music plays as they end up making their way to a tip where they end up selling the CD player
- The song was sampled for J. Cole's 2010 single "Blow Up" from his mixtape Friday Night Lights.
- "Hocus Pocus 2" was included in the GuitarFreaks & DrumMania video game V5 Rock to Infinity and was also used in the 2014 remake of Robocop during a live-fire test with RoboCop (Joel Kinnaman) against a large number of robot drones and the character Mattox.
- The song has also been featured on the 2016 episode "E.A.B." of HBO's Vinyl, and on the 2016 season 7 episode "Own Your Shit" of Showtime's Shameless.
- The song was also used in the 2013 documentary 1. In this film about Formula 1 racing, the pulsing song was the backdrop for in-car footage of Ayrton Senna's qualifying lap at the Monaco Grand Prix.
- Hocus Pocus accompanied the chase scenes of Dave TV's 2016 fantasy comedy Zapped, in series 3 episode 5 entitled "Book".
- The song was prominently featured in a scene in Edgar Wright’s 2017 film Baby Driver and is featured on its soundtrack, elements of the track having been used in Wright's 2007 film Hot Fuzz by composer David Arnold.
- The song was used in the trailer for Pixar's 2020 film Onward. It was also used in DreamWorks' 2020 film Trolls World Tour as well as in the end credits of the 2020 Netflix film The Babysitter: Killer Queen. On the 7th-Inning Stretch livestream, organist Josh Kantor performs the song to celebrate viewers' birthdays.
- The song was used in Finland as the theme song for the YLE television programme Iltatähti, which was aired in 1973–1983.
- The song was performed in October 2024 in Finland in the YLE programme Elämäni biisi ("Song of my Life"), by the programme's house band. The song had been chosen by Mato Valtonen, who commented the song as follows: "At the age of 16, there was this jolt in my life, when I heard a completely insane song, which had yodeling, whistling and all kinds of crazy sounds. The first thing I thought was that you can't do a song like this, this is too crazy. But my second reaction was that of course you have to be this crazy. I had been inhibited in a hell of a many ways, and this liberated me", Valtonen explained in the episode. In social media, the song was hailed as the greatest one in the history of the show. It was performed by Timo Kämäräinen (guitar), Lenni-Kalle Taipale (keyboards and accordion), and Diandra Flores, Tero Vesterinen and Lauri Mikkola (vocals, Mikkola also played tin whistle).
