= Pierre van der Linden =

Dutch musician

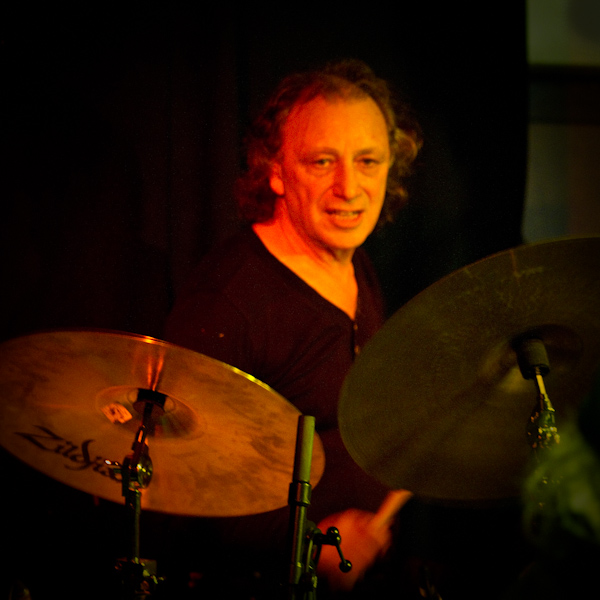
- Pierre van der Linden in 2012

Background information
- Born: Pierre van der Linden; 19 February 1946 (age 80); Amsterdam, Netherlands
- Genres: Progressive rock; jazz rock
- Instrument: Drums
- Years active: 1963–present
- Labels: Sire Records; EMI; CBS; Ariola
- Member of: Brainbox, Focus
- Formerly of: Johnny and his Cellar Rockers; Advance Warning; Sweet'd Buster's; Trace

Pierre van der Linden (born 19 February 1946) is a Dutch drummer and member of the band, Focus.

== Early life ==
Pierre van der Linden was born in Amsterdam in 1946. His father was Dutch actor Ab van der Linden, who was known in the Netherlands for being "Flappie", one half of the comedy duo "Appie and Flappie". As a teenager in the early 1960s, he played in many local bands, including "ZZ en de Maskers".

== Career ==
In 1968, he formed the band Brainbox with Jan Akkerman and Cyril Havermans. He and Akkerman were also in the 60s group Johnny and the Cellar Rockets together. All three members were later recruited to join Focus; Akkerman and Havermans in 1969, and Van der Linden in 1971. Van der Linden and Akkerman played on their biggest record "Hocus Pocus" (1973). He left in October 1973, and was quickly recruited into the supergroup Trace, that also included his second cousin Rick van der Linden on keyboards and vocals. They released three albums, toured Europe, and ended in 1978.

When Colin Allen left Focus, Pierre briefly rejoined the group in 1975 for live dates and an unreleased track, "Glider", subsequently on the "Ship of Memories" LP. He toured and recorded with Jan Akkerman on Jan's solo album "Eli" in 1976, and on "Floatin'" on Akkerman's eponymous 1977 release. He also recorded with jazz keyboardist Jasper van 't Hof and with band Sweet'd Buster's "Out of the Blue" in 1980.

In the 1990s he joined the free jazz group Advance Warning and played on four albums: Cut the Crap, Regroovable, Hot House, and HiFi Apartment. He also recorded in a trio with organist Herbert Noord and tenor saxophonist Rinus Groeneveld, and rated the album Dare to Be Different as one that he was particularly proud to play on. In 2009, Pierre and original Kaz Lux made Brainbox again, and the two are still members with a new lineup as of 2024. Linden has released two solo albums, including "Drum Poetry" in 2017.

== Influence and technique ==
Van der Linden was influenced by his childhood hero Buddy Rich. He finds inspiration in French philosophers and classical composers of the twentieth century. For drumming, he is influenced by Tony Williams and Elvin Jones. Van der Linden practises his drumming technique each day, at least one hour on his practise pad. He avoids modern tuning and prefers to use open tuning, closer to a jazz than a rock drummer, and adopts a mix of matched grip and traditional grip. Away from music, van der Linden enjoys painting and writing poetry.

== Discography ==
Brainbox

(See Brainbox)

Focus

(See Focus discography)

Trace

- Trace (1974)

Jan Akkerman

- Eli (1976)
- Jan Akkerman (1977)

Solo

- Swung Vol. 1 & 2 (2014)
- Drum Poetry (2017)
