= Bert Ruiter =

Dutch bass guitarist (1946–2022)

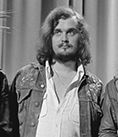
- Focus (1974); Bert Ruiter

Background information
- Born: 26 November 1946; Amsterdam, Netherlands
- Died: 14 March 2022 (aged 75) Netherlands
- Occupation: Bassist
- Years active: 1960s–2022
- Formerly of: Focus, Earth and Fire
- Partner: Jerney Kaagman

Bert Ruiter (born 26 November 1946 – 14 March 2022) was a Dutch bass guitarist, record producer, and composer. He was best known for being the bassist for Focus from 1971 to 1978.

Ruiter was also the bassist for Earth and Fire from 1978 to 1990, later having a long-standing relationship with the group's lead vocalist Jerney Kaagman. They were together for over three decades, up until Bert's death from cancer in 2022.

== Early life ==
Albertus Clemens Ruiter was born in Amsterdam and grew up in Hilversum. When he was twelve he started playing guitar by ear; later he switched to bass guitar.

== Career ==
In 1966 he began his career by replacing Dick Ankersmit as bass guitarist for The Caps, with singer Hans van Hemert and guitarist Roy Beltman. Afterwards, he played in the groups Fullhouse and the Jay-Jays.

In September 1971 he replaced Cyril Havermans as the bass guitarist in Focus. He remained with Focus until the group dissolved in 1978. He then joined Earth and Fire, the group in which Jerney Kaagman sang (Bert partnered with Kaagman in 1974). Ruiter played bass on the most Earth and Fire albums. The two later left Earth and Fire, and Ruiter worked with Kaagman on her solo albums, gradually assuming more of a role as producer and arranger.

From 1987 to 1990, he was in a new version of Earth and Fire with Kaagman.

In 1999 Ruiter rejoined Thijs van Leer and drummer Hans Cleuver with guitarist Menno Gootjes, for a new incarnation of Focus, but internal wrangling split the group after only a few live dates in the Netherlands.

== Personal life and death ==
For over three decades, Ruiter was in a relationship with Jerney Kaagman. Ruiter died on 14 March 2022, aged 75. His cause of death was revealed as esophageal cancer. Kaagman retired from singing in 2012 after announcing her diagnosis of Parkinson's disease, and she died on 31 July 2026.

== See also ==
- Fender Jazz Bass
