= Diane Schuur discography =

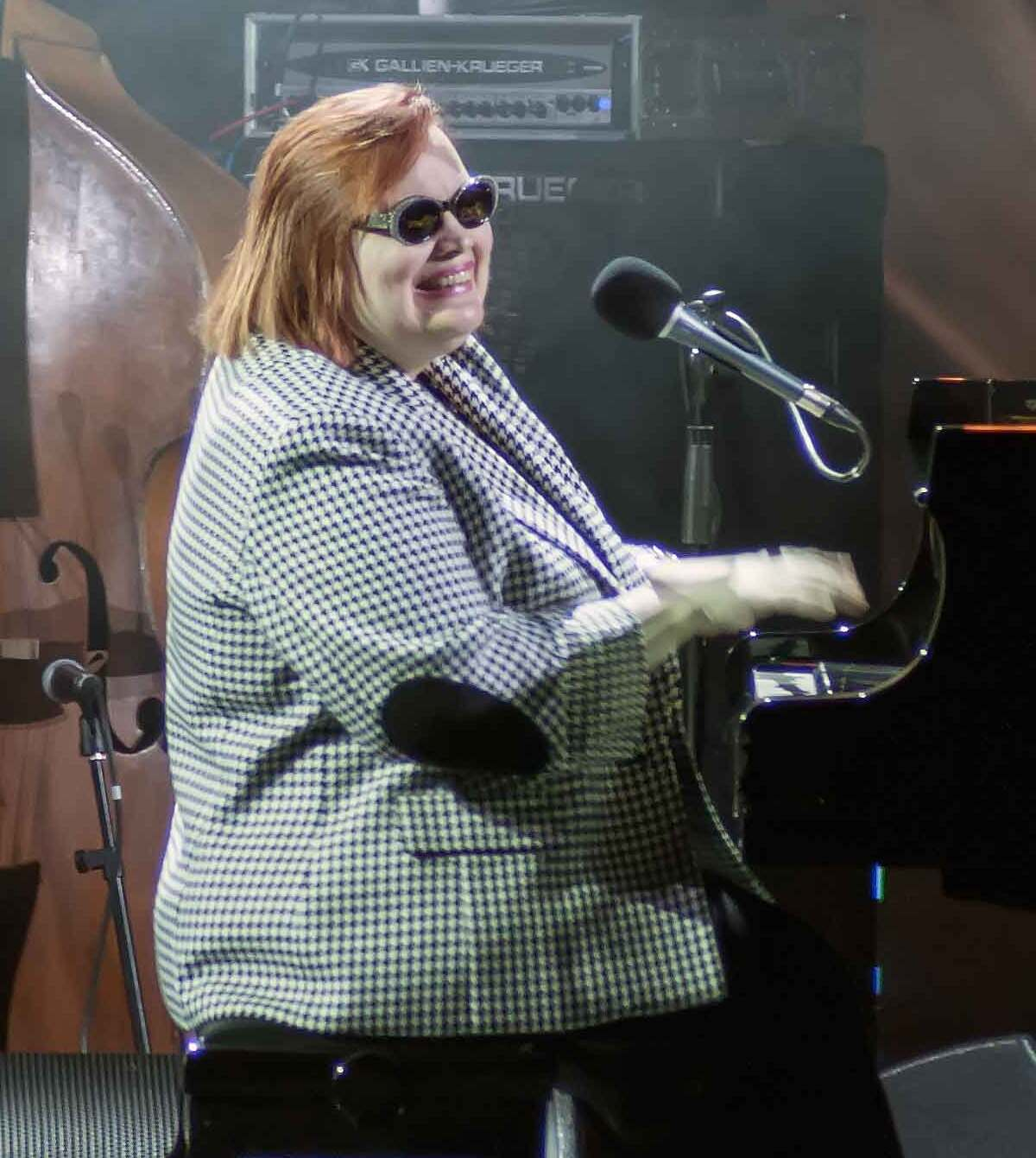
- Shuur at the International Winter Arts Festival in Sochi in 2019
- Studio albums: 20
- Live albums: 3
- Compilation albums: 2
- Singles: 8
- Video albums: 4

The discography of American jazz singer and pianist Diane Schuur includes twenty studio albums, three live albums, two compilations, four video albums and eight singles.

== Albums ==
=== Studio albums ===
| Title | Album details | Peak chart positions | | | | | |
| Title | Album details | US BB Pop | US BB Jazz | US BB Trad. Jazz | US BB Cont. Jazz | US CB Jazz | US CB Trad. Jazz |
|---|---|---|---|---|---|---|---|
| Pilot of My Destiny | Released: 1982; Label: Great American Records; Formats: LP, digital | — | — | — | — | — | — |
| Deedles | Released: 1984; Label: GRP Records; Formats: LP, MC, CD, digital | — | — | 33 | — | 30 | — |
| Schuur Thing | Released: 1985; Label: GRP Records; Formats: LP, MC, CD, digital | — | — | 10 | — | 4 | — |
| Timeless | Released: 1986; Label: GRP Records; Formats: LP, MC, CD, digital | — | — | 13 | 17 | — | — |
| Talkin' 'Bout You | Released: 1988; Label: GRP Records; Formats: LP, MC, CD | 170 | — | 1 | — | 4 | 1 |
| Pure Schuur | Released: 1991; Label: GRP Records; Formats: LP, MC, CD, digital | 148 | — | — | 1 | — | — |
| In Tribute | Released: 1992; Label: GRP Records; Formats: CD, MC, digital | — | — | 2 | — | — | — |
| Love Songs | Released: 1993; Label: GRP Records; Formats: CD, MC, digital | — | — | 3 | — | — | — |
| Heart to Heart (with B. B. King) | Released: 1994; Label: GRP Records; Formats: CD, MC, digital | — | 6 | 1 | — | — | — |
| Love Walked In | Released: 1996; Label: GRP Records; Formats: CD, digital | — | 32 | 12 | — | — | — |
| Blues for Schuur | Released: 1997; Label: GRP Records; Formats: CD, digital | — | 17 | 5 | — | — | — |
| Music Is My Life | Released: March 2, 1999; Label: Atlantic Records; Formats: CD, digital | — | 18 | 8 | — | — | — |
| Friends for Schuur | Released: September 26, 2000; Label: Concord Jazz; Formats: CD, digital | — | 33 | — | 22 | — | — |
| Swingin' for Schuur (with Maynard Ferguson) | Released: September 21, 2001; Label: Concord Records; Formats: CD, digital | — | 23 | 8 | — | — | — |
| Midnight | Released: July 22, 2003; Label: Concord Jazz; Formats: CD, digital | — | 30 | — | 19 | — | — |
| Schuur Fire | Released: April 5, 2005; Label: Concord Picante, Stiletto Entertainment; Formats: CD, digital | — | 41 | — | — | — | — |
| Some Other Time | Released: February 26, 2008; Label: Concord Records; Formats: CD, digital | — | 19 | 11 | — | — | — |
| The Gathering | Released: June 21, 2011; Label: Vanguard Records; Formats: CD, LP, digital | — | 31 | 20 | — | — | — |
| I Remember You: Love to Stan and Frank | Released: June 10, 2014; Label: Jazzheads; Formats: CD, digital | — | 10 | 5 | — | — | — |
| Running on Faith | Released: May 8, 2020; Label: Jazzheads; Formats: CD, digital | — | — | — | — | — | — |
"—" denotes a recording that did not chart.

=== Live albums ===
| Title | Album details | Peak chart positions | | |
| Title | Album details | US BB Jazz | US BB Trad. Jazz | US CB Trad. Jazz |
|---|---|---|---|---|
| Diane Schuur & the Count Basie Orchestra | Released: 1987; Label: GRP Records; Formats: LP, MC, CD, digital | — | 1 | 2 |
| Live in London | Released: June 6, 2006; Label: GR2 Records; Formats: CD, digital | 11 | — | — |
| Live | Released: 2012; Label: —; Formats: CD, digital | — | — | — |
"—" denotes a recording that did not chart.

=== Compilation albums ===
| Title | Album details | Peak chart positions |
| Title | Album details | US BB Trad. Jazz |
|---|---|---|
| Collection | Released: 1989; Label: GRP Records; Formats: LP, MC, CD, digital | 8 |
| The Best of Diane Schuur | Released: October 27, 1997; Label: GRP Records; Formats: CD, digital | — |
"—" denotes a recording that did not chart.

=== Video albums ===
| Title | Album details |
|---|---|
| Diane Schuur & the Count Basie Orchestra | Released: 1987; Label: Pioneer Artists |
| Live in Japan | Released: 1992; Label: Lob |
| Live at the Brewhouse | Released: 2003; Label: Eagle Vision |
| Live from Seattle — Live from the King Cat Theater | Released: 2006; Label: Paradise MediaWerks |

== Singles ==
| Title | Year | Album |
|---|---|---|
| "The Lonely Road" b/w "Faded Love" | 1971 | Non-album singles |
| "Dear Mommy and Daddy" b/w "The Sun Is Shining" | 1971 | Non-album singles |
| "The Lonely Road" b/w "Faded Love" | 1984 | Deedles |
| "By Design" b/w "American Wedding Song" | 1985 | Schuur Thing |
| "Talkin' 'Bout You" b/w "Ain’t That Love" | 1988 | Talkin' 'Bout You |
| "Funny (But I Still Love You)" b/w "Louisiana Sunday Afternoon" | 1989 | Talkin' 'Bout You |
| "I'd Fly" | 2021 | Non-album singles |
| "Let It Be" | 2022 | Non-album singles |
