= Chuck Domanico =

American jazz bassist (1944–2002)

Background information
- Born: Charles Louis Domanico; January 20, 1944; Chicago, Illinois, U.S.
- Died: October 17, 2002 (aged 58) Los Angeles, California
- Education: Foreman High School
- Genres: Jazz, Pop, Rock & Roll
- Occupations: Musician, composer
- Instruments: Double bass, bass guitar

Charles Louis Domanico (January 20, 1944 – October 17, 2002) was an American jazz bassist and studio musician who played double bass and bass guitar on the West Coast jazz scene.

== Early life and career ==
Domanico was born and raised in Chicago, where he attended Foreman High School. He settled in Los Angeles in the mid-1960s. For nearly forty years, he was a central jazz figure in Hollywood who contributed to many movies and TV programs. Domanico worked with Frank Sinatra, Barbra Streisand, Carmen McRae, Joni Mitchell, Morgana King, Taj Mahal, Tennessee Ernie Ford, Diane Schuur, Natalie Cole, and The Manhattan Transfer. He participated in instrumental jazz performances by Laurindo Almeida, Chet Baker, Gerry Mulligan, Henry Mancini, Lalo Schifrin, Shelly Manne, Anthony Ortega, John Klemmer, Alan Pasqua, Roger Kellaway, Barney Kessel, and Art Pepper.

His bass can be heard in themes for television shows like M*A*S*H, Cheers and Frasier, and he contributed to the soundtracks of more than two thousand films.

== Personal life ==
Domanico died of lung cancer in Los Angeles at the age of 58.

== Discography ==
=== As sideman ===
Unless otherwise noted, Information is taken from AllMusic

With Don Ellis Orchestra

- Don Ellis Orchestra 'Live' at Monterey! (Pacific Jazz, 1966)

With Anthony Ortega

- New Dance! (Revelation, 1967)

With Emil Richards

- New Time Element (Uni, 1967)
- Luntana (Interworld, 1996)

With Oliver Nelson

- The Sound of Feeling (Verve, 1968)
- Black, Brown and Beautiful (Flying Dutchman, 1970)
- Skull Session (Flying Dutchman, 1975)
- Stolen Moments (East Wind, 1975)

With Tom Scott

- Rural Still Life (Impulse!, 1968)
- Hair to Jazz (Flying Dutchman, 1969)
- Paint Your Wagon (Flying Dutchman, 1970)
- Great Scott! (A&M, 1972)
- Tom Scott in L.A. (Flying Dutchman, 1975)

With Ron Anthony

- Oh! Calcutta! (1969)

With Bob Thiele Emergency

- Head Start (Flying Dutchman, 1969)

With Clare Fischer

- Thesaurus (Atlantic, 1969)
- Waltz (1969)
- Reclamation Act of 1972 (Revelation, 1972)

With Kai Winding and J. J. Johnson

- Betwixt & Between (CTI, 1969)

With Stan Kenton

- Hair (Capitol, 1969)

With Barney Kessel

- Feeling Free (Contemporary, 1969)
- Barney Plays Kessel (Concord Jazz, 1975)
- The Artistry (1984)

With Howard Roberts

- Spinning Wheel (Capitol, 1969)

With Townes Van Zandt

- Our Mother the Mountain (Poppy, 1969)

With Dave Mackay & Vicky Hamilton

- Rainbows (Impulse!, 1970)

With João Donato

- A Bad Donato (Blue Thumb, 1970)

With Scott McKenzie

- Stained Glass Morning (Ode, 1970)

With Pisano & Ruff

- Under the Blanket (A&M, 1970)

With Marc Benno

- Minnows (A&M, 1971)

With Les Crane

- Desiderata (Warner Bros., 1971)

With Roger Kellaway

- Roger Kellaway Cello Quartet (A&M, 1971)
- Come to the Meadow (A&M, 1974)
- Nostalgia Suite (Discwater, 1978)
- Windows (Angel, 1993)
- As It Happened Vol. 1 (Jazz Heritage, 2002; Recorded in 1982)

With Lani Hall

- Sun Down Lady (A&M, 1972)
- Sweet Bird (A&M, 1976)
- Double or Nothing (A&M, 1979)
- Brasil Nativo (Windham Hill, 1998)

With Harvey Mandel

- The Snake (Janus, 1972)

With Carmen McRae

- The Great American Songbook (Atlantic, 1972)

With Melanie

- Stoneground Words (Neighborhood, 1972)
- Madrugada (Neighborhood, 1974)

With Gerry Mulligan

- The Age of Steam (A&M, 1972)

With Carroll O'Connor

- Remembering You (A&M, 1972)

With Cyril Havermans

- Cyril (MGM, 1973)

With Victor Feldman

- Your Smile (Choice, 1974)
- The Artful Dodger (Concord Jazz, 1977)
- Rockavibabe (DJM, 1977)
- In My Pocket (Cohearent, 1978)
- Rio Nights (TBA, 1987)
- The Best of Feldman and the Generation Band (Nova, 1989)

With Henry Mancini

- Hangin' Out with Henry Mancini (RCA, 1974)
- Switch: Original Score (Varése Sarabande, 1991)

With Phoebe Snow

- Phoebe Snow (Shelter, 1974)
- It Looks Like Snow (Columbia, 1976)

With Elek Bacsik

- Bird and Dizzy: A Musical Tribute (Flying Dutchman, 1975)

With Richard "Groove" Holmes

- Six Million Dollar Man (Flying Dutchman, 1975)

With Rita Coolidge

- It's Only Love (A&M, 1975)
- Out of the Blue (Beacon, 1996)

With Terry Garthwaite

- Terry (Arista, 1975)

With Richard "Groove" Holmes

- Six Million Dollar Man (Flying Dutchman, 1975)

With Bobby Hutcherson

- Montara (Blue Note, 1975)
- Un Poco Loco (Columbia, 1980; Recorded in 1979)

With John Klemmer

- Touch (ABC, 1975)
- Barefoot Ballet (ABC, 1976)
- Lifestyle (Living & Loving) (ABC, 1977)
- The Best...Vol. 1: Mosaic (MCA, 1980)
- Music (MCA, 1989)

With Louis Bellson

- The Drum Session (Philips, 1975)
- The Drum Session Vol. 2 (Philips, 1977)

With Danny O'Keefe

- So Long Harry Truman (Atlantic, 1975)

With Moacir Santos

- Carnival of the Spirits (Blue Note, 1975)

With Tennessee Ernie Ford & Glen Campbell

- Ernie Sings & Glen Picks (Capitol, 1975)

With Peter Allen

- Taught by Experts (A&M, 1976)

With Barbara Carroll

- Barbara Carroll (Blue Note, 1976)

With Sonny Criss

- Warm & Sonny (ABC, 1976)
- The Joy of Sax (ABC, 1977)

With Bonnie Koloc

- Close-Up (Epic, 1976)

With Shelly Manne

- Plays Richard Rodgers' Musical 'Rex' (Discovery, 1976)
- Essence (Galaxy, 1977)
- Jazz Quartet Interpretations (Trend, 1980)
- Goodbye for Bill Evans (Polydor, 1981)
- Double Piano...at Carmelo's Vol. 1 (Trend, 1981)
- Double Piano...at Carmelo's, Vol. 2 (Trend, 1982)

With Wade Marcus

- Metamorphosis (ABC, 1976)

With Joni Mitchell

- Hejira (Asylum, 1976)

With Jaye P. Morgan

- Jaye P. Morgan (Candor, 1976)

With Jimmy Ponder

- Illusions (ABC, 1976)

With Ray Charles and Cleo Laine

- Porgy & Bess (RCA, 1976)

With JD Souther

- Black Rose (Asylum, 1976)

With The Tubes

- Young and Rich (A&M, 1976)

With Voudouris & Kahne

- Street Player (Capitol, 1976)

With Mike Wofford

- Scott Joplin: Interpretations '76 (Flying Dutchman, 1976)

With Laurindo Almeida

- Virtuoso Guitar (Crystal Clear, 1977)

With Gato Barbieri

- Ruby, Ruby (A&M, 1977)

With Claus Ogerman Orchestra

- Gate of Dreams (Warner Bros., 1977)

With John Denver

- I Want to Live (RCA, 1977)

With Joe Harnell

- Harnell (Capitol, 1977)

With Henry Mancini & John Laws

- Just You and Me Together Love (RCA, 1977)

With Blue Mitchell

- African Violet (Impulse!, 1977)

With The Pointer Sisters

- Having a Party (ABC, 1977)

With Ben Sidran

- The Doctor Is In (Arista, 1977)

With Dennis Wilson

- Pacific Ocean Blue (Caribou, 1977)

With Ry Cooder

- Jazz (Warner Bros., 1978)

With Lorraine Feather

- Sweet Lorraine (Concord Jazz, 1978)

With Rodney Franklin

- In the Center (CBS, 1978)

With Michael Franks

- Burchfield Nines (Warner Bros., 1978)

With Ted Gärdestad

- Blue Virgin Isles (Polar, 1978)

With Herb Alpert and Hugh Masekela

- Herb Alpert / Hugh Masekela (A&M, 1978)

With The Moirs

- State of Shock (Rocket, 1978)

With The Singers Unlimited

- Just in Time (Pausa, 1978)

With Allyn Ferguson & Jack Elliott

- The Orchestra (FNAM, 1979)

With Gabe Baltazar

- Stan Kenton Presents Gabe Baltazar (Creative World, 1979)

With Freddie Hubbard

- The Love Connection (Columbia, 1979)

With The Manhattan Transfer

- Extensions (Atlantic, 1979)
- The Christmas Album (Columbia, 1992)

With Shelly Manne and Lee Konitz

- French Concert (Galaxy, 1979)

With Toni Brown

- Toni Brown (Fantasy, 1979)

With Jimmy Smith

- The Cat Strikes Again (Inner City, 1980)

With Spinetta

- Only Love Can Sustain (Columbia, 1980)

With Sonny Stitt

- Groovin' High (Atlas, 1980)

With Frank Sinatra

- Trilogy: Past Present Future (Reprise, 1980)
- She Shot Me Down (Reprise, 1981)

With Bobby Shew Quartet

- Debut (Discomate, 1981)

With Bobby Enriquez

- The Wild Man (GNP Cresendo, 1981)

With Teresa Brewer

- A Sophisticated Lady (Columbia, 1981)
- 16 Most Requested Songs (Columbia, 1991)

With The Carpenters

- Voice of the Heart (A&M, 1983)

With Steve Perry

- Street Talk (Columbia, 1984)

With Bobby and the Midnites

- Where the Beat Meets the Street (Columbia, 1984)

With Sam Harris

- Sam Harris (Motown, 1984)

With Patti Austin

- Patti Austin (Qwest, 1984)
- The Real Me (Qwest, 1988)

With Diane Schuur

- Schuur Thing (GRP, 1985)
- In Tribute (GRP, 1992)
- Love Songs (GRP, 1993)

With Lou Rawls

- Love All Your Blues Away (Epic, 1986)

With Herb Alpert

- Keep Your Eye on Me (A&M, 1987)

With George Benson & Earl Klugh

- Collaboration (Warner Bros., 1987)

With Sarah Vaughan & Milton Nascimento

- Brazilian Romance (Columbia, 1987)

With Brandon Fields

- The Traveler (Nova, 1988)

With Claude Bolling & Hubert Laws

- California Suite (Columbia, 1988)

With Rod McKuen

- It Had to Be You (Desert Island, 1989)

With Bonnie Raitt

- Nick of Time (Capitol, 1989)

With Joe Sample

- Spellbound (Warner Bros., 1989)

With Iggy Pop

- Brick by Brick (Virgin, 1990)

With Julio Iglesias

- Starry Night (Columbia, 1990)

With Monica Lewis

- My Favorite Things (DRG, 1990)
- Swings Jule Styne (DRG, 1992)

With The Simpsons

- The Simpsons Sing the Blues (Geffen, 1990)

With Dionne Warwick

- Dionne Warwick Sings Cole Porter (Arista, 1990)

With Dwight Yoakam

- If There Was a Way (Reprise, 1990)
- Under the Covers (Reprise, 1997)
- A Long Way Home (Reprise, 1998)

With Pat Benatar

- True Love (Chrysalis, 1991)
- Synchronistic Wanderings (Chrysalis, 1999)
- Christmas in America (Gold Circle, 2001)

With David Benoit

- Shadows (GRP, 1991)

With Natalie Cole

- Unforgettable... with Love (Elektra, 1991)
- Stardust (Elektra, 1996)

With Barry Manilow

- Showstoppers (Arista, 1991)
- Manilow Sings Sinatra (Arista, 1998)

With Cheryl Bentyne

- Something Cool (Columbia, 1992)

With Michael Bolton

- Timeless: The Classics (Columbia, 1992)
- This Is the Time: The Christmas Album (Columbia, 1996)

With Peter Hofmann

- Singt Elvis Presley: Love Me Tender (Columbia, 1992)

With Shirley Horn

- Here's to Life (Verve, 1992)
- You're My Thrill (Verve, 2001)

With Robert Palmer

- Ridin' High (EMI, 1992)

With Tommy Tedesco

- Performs Roumanis' Jazz Rhapsody for Guitar & Orchestra (Capri, 1992)

With Wilson Phillips

- Shadows and Light (SBK, 1992)

With Harry Connick Jr.

- When My Heart Finds Christmas (Columbia, 1993)
- Come by Me (Columbia, 1999)

With David Foster

- The Christmas Album (Interscope, 1993)

With Taj Mahal

- Dancing the Blues (Private Music, 1993)

With Johnny Mathis

- How Do You Keep the Music Playing? (Columbia, 1993)
- Mathis on Broadway (Columbia, 2000)

With Terry Trotter

- It's About Time (Mama, 1993)

With The Wilsons

- Hey Santa! (SBK, 1993)

With David Benoit & Russ Freeman

- The Benoit/Freeman Project (GRP, 1994)

With Julia Migenes & Michael Kamen

- Smile (Elektra, 1994)

With Kenny Rogers

- Timepiece (143, 1994)

With Margie Gibson & Lincoln Mayorga

- Say It with Music (1994)

With Lori Lieberman

- A Thousand Dreams (Pope Music, 1994)

With John Raitt

- Broadway Legend (Angel, 1995)

With Diana Ross

- Take Me Higher (Motown, 1995)

With Anne Kerry Ford

- In the Nest of the Moon (Illyria, 1996)

With Michael Lang

- Days of Wine and Roses (Varese Sarabande, 1996)

With David Garfield & Friends

- Tribute To Jeff Porcaro (Zebra, 1997)

With Niki Haris

- Dreaming a Dream (BMG, 1997)

With Ottmar Liebert

- Leaning into the Night (Sony Classical / BMG, 1997)

With Jon Secada

- Secada (Virgin, 1997)

With Bette Midler

- Bathhouse Betty (Warner Bros., 1998)

With Céline Dion

- These Are Special Times (Epic Records, 1998)

With Neil Diamond

- The Movie Album: As Time Goes By (Columbia Records, 1998)
- Three Chord Opera (Columbia Records, 2001)

With Mary J. Blige

- Mary (MCA Records, 1999)

With Barbra Streisand

- Christmas Memories (Columbia Records, 2001)

With Lee Ann Womack

- The Season for Romance (MCA Records, 2002)
