= Talkin' 'bout You =

Talkin' 'bout You may refer to:

- Talkin' 'bout You (song), a song by Ray Charles
- Talkin' 'Bout You (album), a 1988 album by Diane Schuur
- Talkin' About You, an album by Nat Adderley's Quintet
