= Mindwave =

Mindwave may refer to:

- Mind-Wave, a supervillain from Marvel Comics
- Mindwave (video game), an upcoming indie action game
- Mind Wave, a studio album by Cyril Havermans
- MindWave, a product by NeuroSky
