= I Just Found Out About Love =

"I Just Found Out About Love" is a popular song composed by Jimmy McHugh, with lyrics by Harold Adamson for the short-lived musical Strip for Action. After several pre-Broadway tryouts, the show finally came to Boston in April 1956, where it "fell off the rails completely." The city authorities tried to ban it for gratuitous nudity, because of a scene involving two girls in flesh-colored body stockings who posed discreetly upstage. The show closed early and never made it to Broadway.

Other songs in the musical were "Too Young to Go Steady", "Dame Crazy" and "Love Me As Though There Were No Tomorrow".

== Notable recordings ==
- Nat King Cole - for his EP Nat "King" Cole Sings Songs from "Strip for Action" (1956).
- Ronnie Hilton - a single release in the UK in 1956.
- Johnny Mathis - for his double album The Rhythms and Ballads of Broadway (1960)
- Fran Jeffries - included in her album Fran: Can Really Hang You Up the Most (1961)
- Dinah Washington - included in her album Tears and Laughter (1962)
- Diane Schuur - Diane Schuur & the Count Basie Orchestra (1987)
- Marina Xavier - Where Do You Start? (2010)
- Diana Krall - Performed live at her 2010 concert in Montreux
