= Washington State School for the Blind =

- Washington State School for the Blind; Listed as Washington School for the Blind
- U.S. National Register of Historic Places
- U.S. Historic district
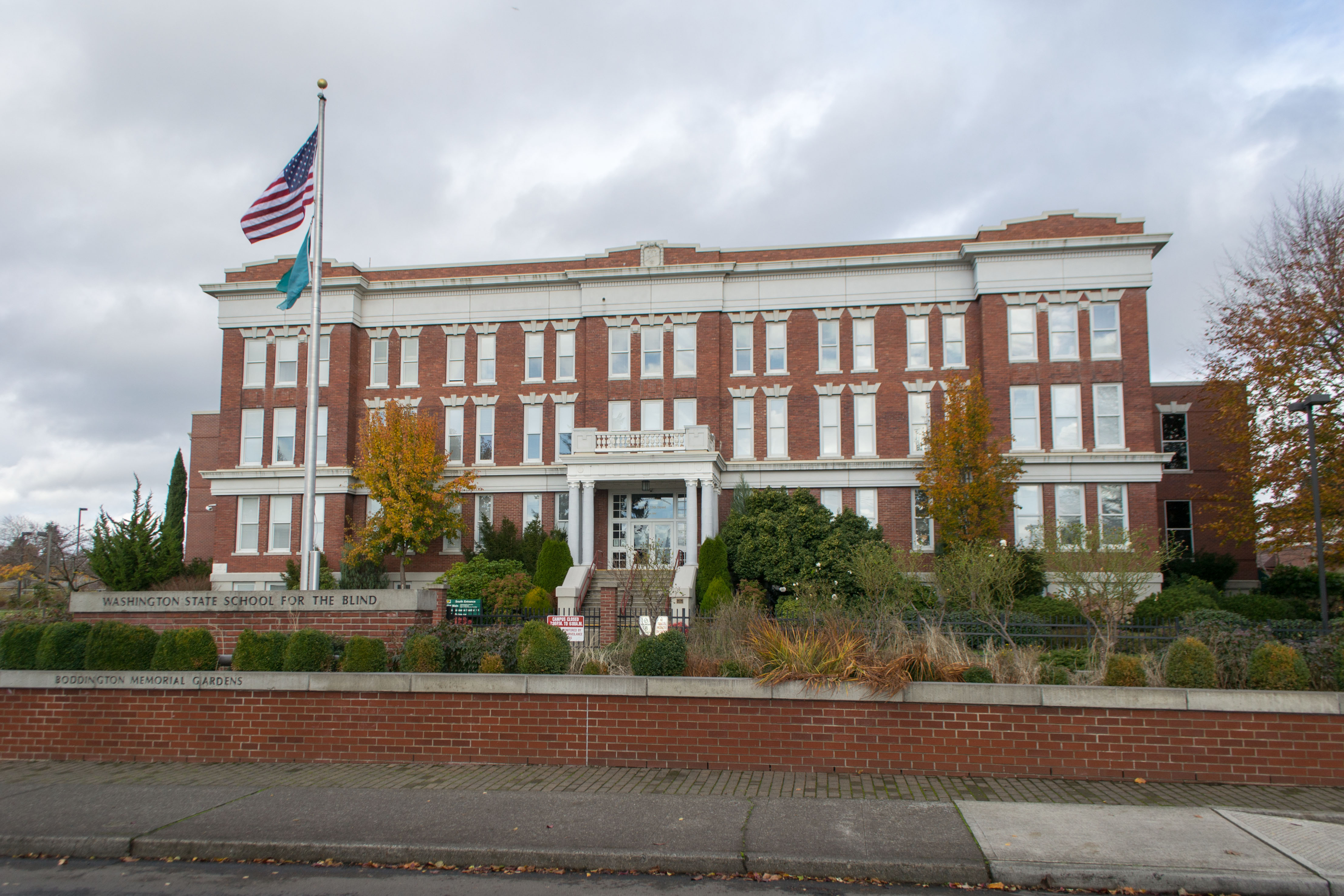
- The school in 2013

- Location within Washington (state)
- Location: 2214 East 13th Street, Vancouver, Washington
- Coordinates: 45°38′24″N 122°38′46″W
- Area: 13.2 acres (5.3 ha)
- Built: 1911
- Architect: Julius Zittel
- Architectural style: Classical Revival
- NRHP reference No.: 93000370
- Added to NRHP: May 14, 1993

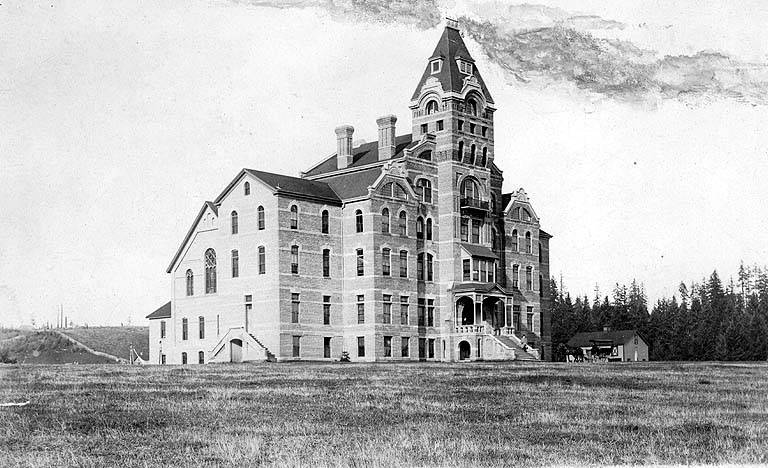
State School for Defective Youth, Vancouver, Washington, c. 1890

The Washington State School for the Blind (WSSB, ⠺⠎⠎⠃), formerly known as the Washington School for the Blind, is a school for visually-impaired, blind, or deaf-blind students, located in Vancouver, Washington in the United States. The school building was added to the National Register of Historic Places in 1993.

== History ==
In 1886, the Washington Territory Legislature established the State School for Defective Youth in Vancouver, Washington. The act established a "school for the deaf, mute, blind, and feeble minded". Louis Sohns and Charles Brown raised money from local civic leaders, purchased property, and built buildings for the school. They were also added as trustees for the school.

In 1891, School Director James Watson recommended that the "feeble minded" be separated from the blind and deaf students. They were relocated to another facility nearby. In 1906, the "feeble minded" were relocated to a state school at Medical Lake in Eastern Washington (now called Lakeland Village). The Vancouver school's name was changed to the State School for the Deaf and Blind, with the blind students moved to the former facility for the "feeble minded".

In 1913, the two schools were officially separated by name, the State School for the Blind, and the State School for the Deaf.

== Campus ==
The school has dormitory facilities in cottages.

== Notable alumni ==
Jazz singer and pianist Diane Schuur, blind since birth from retinopathy of prematurity, attended the Washington State School for the Blind from ages four to seven, in the late 1950s to early 1960s. She lived in Vancouver at the school but was able to commute home by train to suburban Seattle on her own. In her twenties, her talent was recognized by jazz musicians Dizzie Gillespie and Stan Getz. She has made over 20 albums including the Grammy-winning Diane Schuur & the Count Basie Orchestra. She has performed at Carnegie Hall, The White House and the Kennedy Center. Schuur was awarded the Helen Keller Achievement Award in 2000 by the American Foundation for the Blind.

== Later history ==
In 2008, the school hosted a "tactile museum of natural history" experience and fundraiser called Sensory Safari. The event benefitted the Washington School for the Blind Foundation, which supports student activities and funds technology and equipment for the school.

== See also ==
- Blindness and education
- National Register of Historic Places listings in Clark County, Washington
