= Love Walked In (album) =

Studio album by Diane Schuur
- Released: 1996
- Genre: Vocal jazz
- Length: 36:13
- Label: GRP
- Producer: Al Schmitt

Diane Schuur chronology
Heart to Heart (1994)	Love Walked In (1996)	Blues for Schuur (1997)

Love Walked In is the tenth studio album by American singer and pianist Diane Schuur, recorded with producer Al Schmitt. It was released in 1996 on the GRP Records label.

== Critical reception ==
Professional ratings
Review scores
Source	Rating
AllMusic	4/5 stars
The Encyclopedia of Popular Music	3/5 stars
MusicHound Jazz: The Essential Album Guide	3/5 stars
The Rolling Stone Jazz & Blues Album Guide	3/5 stars

Scott Yanow, in his review for AllMusic, noted that the interpretations are simple and do not contain much improvisation, although Sсhuur sounds quite soulful, demonstrating the influence of Dinah Washington of the late period, while the redundancy of Sсhuur's early years disappeared, and in its place appeared a warm and peaceful voice, sounding best in ballads.

== Track listing ==
No.	Title	Writer(s)	Length
1.	"Love Walked In"	George Gershwin; Ira Gershwin	2:14
2.	"Time After Time"	Sammy Cahn; Jule Styne	3:20
3.	"Say It Isn't So"	Irving Berlin	4:04
4.	"Blue Gardenia"	Bob Russell; Lester Lee	3:05
5.	"Never Let Me Go"	Jay Livingston; Ray Evans	4:50
6.	"Nothing Ever Changes My Love for You"	Jack Segal; Marvin Fisher	3:51
7.	"Sunday Kind of Love"	Barbara Belle; Anita Leonard; Stan Rhodes; Louis Prima	4:00
8.	"How Deep Is the Ocean"	Berlin	3:36
9.	"You're a Sweetheart"	Harold Adamson; Jimmy McHugh	2:37
10.	"I Wanna Be Loved"	Billy Rose; Edward Heyman; John W. Green	4:36
Total length:			36:13

== Charts ==
Weekly chart performance for Love Walked In
Chart (1996)	Peak position
US Top Jazz Albums (Billboard)	12
