= The Movie Album: As Time Goes By =

Studio album by Neil Diamond
- Released: October 26, 1998
- Recorded: 1997–1998
- Studio: 20th Century Fox Post Production Services, Arch Angel Studios, Record Plant and Newman Scoring Stage (Los Angeles, California); Bill Schnee Studios (North Hollywood, California)
- Genre: Pop
- Length: 1:06:52
- Label: Columbia
- Producer: Bob Gaudio

Neil Diamond chronology
In My Lifetime (1996)	The Movie Album: As Time Goes By (1998)	20th Century Masters – The Millennium Collection: The Best of Neil Diamond (1999)

Professional ratings
Review scores
Source	Rating
Allmusic	2/5 stars

The Movie Album: As Time Goes By is a 1998 album by Neil Diamond, his twenty-fourth studio album, conducted by Elmer Bernstein. It peaked at number 31 on the Billboard 200 chart.

== Track listing ==
Disc one
No.	Title	Writer(s)	Film	Length
1.	"As Time Goes By"	Herman Hupfeld	Casablanca	2:56
2.	"Secret Love"	Sammy Fain, Paul Francis Webster	Calamity Jane	3:39
3.	"Unchained Melody"	Alex North, Hy Zaret	Unchained	3:49
4.	"Can You Feel the Love Tonight"	Elton John, Tim Rice	The Lion King	4:08
5.	"The Way You Look Tonight"	Jerome Kern, Dorothy Fields	Swing Time	2:39
6.	"Love with the Proper Stranger"	Elmer Bernstein, Johnny Mercer	Love with the Proper Stranger	3:28
7.	"Puttin' On the Ritz"	Irving Berlin	Puttin' On the Ritz	2:57
8.	"When You Wish upon a Star"	Leigh Harline, Ned Washington	Pinocchio	2:46
9.	"The Windmills of Your Mind"	Alan Bergman, Marilyn Bergman and Michel Legrand	The Thomas Crown Affair	4:21
10.	"Ebb Tide"	Robert Maxwell, Carl Sigman	Sweet Bird of Youth	2:38

Disc two
No.	Title	Writer(s)	Film	Length
1.	"True Love"	Cole Porter	High Society	3:12
2.	"My Heart Will Go On"	James Horner, Will Jennings	Titanic	4:13
3.	"The Look of Love"	Burt Bacharach, Hal David	Casino Royale	4:00
4.	"In the Still of the Night"	Cole Porter	Rosalie	4:40
5.	"Moon River"	Henry Mancini, Johnny Mercer	Breakfast at Tiffany's	3:32
6.	"Ruby"	Mitchell Parish, Heinz Roemheld	Ruby Gentry	3:16
7.	"I've Got You Under My Skin / One for My Baby" ("Suite Sinatra")	Cole Porter / Harold Arlen, Johnny Mercer	Born to Dance / The Sky's the Limit	4:22
8.	"And I Love Her"	John Lennon and Paul McCartney	A Hard Day's Night	2:25
9.	"Can't Help Falling in Love"	George Weiss, Hugo Peretti and Luigi Creatore	Blue Hawaii	3:07
10.	"As Time Goes By" (reprise)	Herman Hupfield	Casablanca	0:44

== Personnel ==
- Neil Diamond – vocals
- Alan Lindgren – music coordinator
- Elmer Bernstein – orchestra conductor
- Sandy de Crescent – orchestra contractor

=== Arrangements ===
- Jonathan Tunick (1, 2, 16)
- William Ross (3, 7, 8)
- Jeremy Lubbock (4, 5, 12)
- Elmer Bernstein (6)
- Jon Kull (6)
- Alan Lindgren (9, 15, 19)
- Patrick Williams (10, 11)
- Tom Hensley (13, 18)
- Jorge Calandrelli (14)

=== Musicians ===
Rhythm section

Keyboards

- John Berkman, Tom Hensley, Michael Lang and Randy Waldman

Guitars

- George Doering and Dean Parks
- Ramón Stagnaro – guitar solo (14)

Electric bass

- Leland Sklar

Percussion

- Wade Culbreath, Alan Estes, Greg Goodall, Daniel Greco, Peter Limonick and Tom Rainey

Brass and Woodwind section

Bassoon

- Charles Coker, Rose Corrigan, Ken Munday, Michael O'Donovan and Dave Riddles

Clarinet

- Emily Bernstein, Gary Bovyer, Jim Kanter, Samuel Karam, Marty Krystall, Steven Roberts and Ralph Williams

Flute

- Louise Di Tullio, Martin Glicklich, David Shostac, Sheridon Stokes and Jim Walker

Oboe

- Phil Ayling, Tom Boyd, Earl Dumler and John Ellis

French horn

- Steve Becknell, David Duke, Todd Miller, Brian O'Connor, John A. Reynolds, Kurt Snyder, James Thatcher and Phil Yao

Trombone

- William Booth, Alex Iles, Alan Kaplan, Ken Kugler and Phil Teele

Trumpet

- Rick Baptist, Gary Grant, Warren Luening, Malcolm McNab and Tim Morrison

Tuba

- Fred Greene

String section

Cello

- Robert L. Adcock, Paul Cohen, Antony Cooke, Matthew Cooker, Larry Corbett, Ernie Ehrhardt, Steve Erdody, Christine Ermacoff, Todd Hemmenway, Paula Hochhalter, Judith Johnson, Anne Karam, Dennis Karmazyn, Suzie Katayama, Armen Ksajikian, Tim Landauer, Roger Lebow, Dane Little, David Low, Miguel Martinez, Steve Richards, Daniel Smith, David Speltz, Kevan Torfeh, Cecilia Tsan and John Walz

Double bass

- Nico Abondolo, Drew Dembowski, Chuck Domanico, Steve Edelman, Donald V. Ferrone, Richard Feves, Neil Garber, Oscar Hidalgo, Christian Kollgaard, Steve LeFever, Edward Meares, Charles Nennecker, David Parameter, Nicolas Philippon, Dave Stone, Frances Liu Wu and Paul Zibits

Harp

- Marcia Dickstein, Gayle Levant and JoAnn Turovsky

Viola

- Marilyn Baker, Robert Berg, Denyse Buffum, Valerie Dimond, Jerry Epstein, Marlow Fisher, Matt Funes, Rick Gerding, Pamela Goldsmith, Keith Greene, Lynn Grants, Jennie Hansen, Scott Haupert, Roland Kato, Janet Lakatos, Vicki Miskolczy, Dan Neufeld, Maria Newman, Simon Oswell, Karie Prescott, Michael Ramos, Cassandra Richburg, Carolyn Riley, Jimbo Ross, Robin Ross, Nancy Roth, Harry Shirinian, Ron Strauss, Ray Tischer and Mihail Zinovyev

Violin

- Ayke Agus, Eun-Mee Ahn, Patricia Aiken, Richard Altenbach, Jenny Bellusci, Charlie Bisharat, Jackie Brand, Robert Brosseau, Nicole Bush, Andrea Byers, Darius Campos, Lily Ho Chen, Phillipa Clarke, Ron Clark, Kevin Connolly, Mario DeLeon, Joel Derouin, Assa Drori, Bruce Dukov, Jeanne Evans, Charles Everett, David Ewart, Ronald Folsom, Juliann French, Armen Garabedian, Berj Garabedian, Julie Gigante, Harris Goldman, Galina Golovin, Endre Granat, Alan Grunfeld, Julian Hallmark, Marilyn Harding, Clayton Haslop, Tamara Hatwan, Amy Hershberger, Tiffany Yi Hu, Lisa Johnson, Pat Johnson, Karen Jones, Peter Kent, Ovsep Ketendjien, Miran Kojian, Gary Kuo, Connie Kupka, Natalie Leggett, Brian Leonard, Dimitrie Leivici, Phillip Levy, Isabella Lippi, Rene Mandel, Liane Mautner, Jayme Miller, Dennis Molchan, Irma Neumann, Carolyn Osborn, Robin Olson, Sid Page, Claudia Parducci, Rachel Perkin, Michele Richards, Rafael Rishik, Susan Rishik, Mark Robertson, Anatoly Rosinsky, Bob Sanov, Sheldon Sanov, Marc Sazer, Kwihee Shamban, Haim Shtrum, Margaret Sims, Polly Sweeney, Olivia Tsui, Mari Tsumura, Jennifer Walton, Miwako Watanabe, Elizabeth Wilson, North Wood, Kenneth Yerke and Shari Zippert

== Production ==
- Bob Gaudio – producer
- Bill Schnee – recording, mixing
- Bernie Becker – recording engineer
- Koji Egawa – assistant engineer
- John Rodd – orchestra recording
- John Rotondi – orchestra stage engineer
- Tom Steel – stage crew
- Damon Tedesco – stage crew
- Doug Sax – mastering at The Mastering Lab (Hollywood, California)
- Sandy de Crescent – stage manager
- David Low – stage manager
- Stacey Robinson – stage manager, post production
- Sam Cole – production coordinator
- Gabrielle Raumberger – art direction, design
- Clifford Singontiko – design
- Rocky Schenck – photography
- Neal Preston – recording studio photography
- Bill Whitten – wardrobe stylist

== Charts ==
Chart (1998)	Peak position
Australian Albums (ARIA)	59
German Albums (Offizielle Top 100)	72
New Zealand Albums (RMNZ)	43
UK Albums (OCC)	68
US Billboard 200	31

== Certifications ==
Region	Certification	Certified units/sales
United States (RIAA)	Gold	500,000^{^}
^{^} Shipments figures based on certification alone.
