= Love Songs (Diane Schuur album) =

Studio album by Diane Schuur
- Released: 1993
- Genre: Vocal jazz; traditional pop
- Length: 44:21
- Label: GRP
- Producer: Tom Scott; Steve Lindsey

Diane Schuur chronology
In Tribute (1992)	Love Songs (1993)	Heart to Heart (1994)

Love Songs is the eighth studio album by American singer and pianist Diane Schuur, released in 1993 on the GRP Records label. The album received a Grammy Award nomination for Best Traditional Pop Vocal Performance.

== Critical reception ==
Professional ratings
Review scores
Source	Rating
AllMusic	4.5/5 stars
The Encyclopedia of Popular Music	4/5 stars
MusicHound Jazz: The Essential Album Guide	3/5 stars
The Rolling Stone Jazz & Blues Album Guide	3/5 stars

Scott Yanow of AllMusic noted that the jazz content of this Sсhuur disc is quite insignificant, but in fact it is one of the singer's best recordings. In his opinion, she has a wonderful voice here, with which she performs uncomplicated versions of ten old ballads accompanied by a string orchestra, and Sсhuur really stands out in a restrained setting, which makes this record an excellent pop record. In a review by Billboard magazine, they stated that in most tracks, with the support of the orchestra, cloying arrangements sound, which, however, is compensated by the warm phrasing of Schuur and the greatness of the material itself. M. R. Martinez from Cash Box wrote that this collection of songs is an excellent bet on a hit, since Tom Scott is engaged in most of the production, recording It remains fresh, juicy and chic, and Sсhuur brings his emotionally refined interpretation to the mix.

== Track listing ==
No.	Title	Writer(s)	Length
1.	"When I Fall in Love"	Edward Heyman; Victor Young	4:16
2.	"Speak Low (From the Musical Production One Touch of Venus)"	Kurt Weill; Ogden Nash	5:11
3.	"I Thought About You"	Johnny Mercer; Jimmy Van Heusen	3:52
4.	"Prelude to a Kiss"	Irving Gordon; Irving Mills; Duke Ellington	4:55
5.	"Our Love Is Here to Stay"	Ira Gershwin; George Gershwin	3:58
6.	"You'll See"	Carroll Coates	4:22
7.	"September in the Rain"	Al Dubin; Harry Warren	5:05
8.	"The More I See You"	Mack Gordon; Warren	4:29
9.	"Crazy"	Willie Nelson	3:55
10.	"My One and Only Love"	Robert Mellin; Guy Wood	4:18
11.	"Here's That Rainy Day"	Johnny Burke; Van Heusen	4:33
Total length:			44:21

== Charts ==
=== Weekly charts ===
Weekly chart performance for Love Songs
Chart (1993)	Peak position
US Top Jazz Albums (Billboard)	3

=== Year-end charts ===
Year-end chart performance for Love Songs
Chart (1993)	Peak position
US Top Jazz Albums (Billboard)	14
