= Live in London (Diane Schuur album) =

Live album by Diane Schuur
- Released: 2006
- Recorded: 2006
- Genre: Jazz
- Length: 48:28
- Label: GR2 Classics

Diane Schuur chronology
Schuur Fire (2005)	Live in London (2006)	Some Other Time (2008)

Live in London is a 2006 live album by Diane Schuur.

== Track listing ==
1. "Deedles' Blues" (Morgan Ames) – 5:09
2. "I'll Close My Eyes" (Buddy Kaye, Billy Reid) – 4:37
3. "Close Enough for Love" (Johnny Mandel, Paul Williams) – 4:17
4. "As" (Stevie Wonder) – 6:47
5. "Poinciana" (Buddy Bernier, Nat Simon) – 5:34
6. "Don't Let Me Be Lonely Tonight" (James Taylor) – 4:07
7. "You'd Be So Nice to Come Home To" (Cole Porter) – 4:14
8. "When October Goes" (Barry Manilow, Johnny Mercer) – 5:37
9. "Besame Mucho" (Consuelo Velazquez) – 6:56
10. "The Very Thought of You" (Ray Noble) – 6:39
11. "So in Love" (Porter) – 7:03
12. "It Don't Mean a Thing (If It Ain't Got That Swing)" (Duke Ellington, Irving Mills) – 6:50
13. "Send Me Someone to Love" (Curtis Mayfield) – 4:02
14. "Over the Rainbow" (Harold Arlen) – 3:30

== Personnel ==
- Diane Schuur – vocals, piano
- Rod Fleeman – guitar
- Scott Steed – double bass
- Reggie Jackson - drums
