= Sweet Bird =

Studio album by Lani Hall
- Released: 1977
- Recorded: 1976
- Studio: A&M (Hollywood)
- Genre: Jazz
- Label: A&M
- Producer: Herb Alpert

Lani Hall chronology
Hello It's Me (1972)	Sweet Bird (1977)	Double or Nothing (1979)

Sweet Bird is an album by the American singer Lani Hall. Like many of Hall's albums, Sweet Bird is made up of cover versions of songs.

== Track listing ==
1. "Send in the Clowns" (Stephen Sondheim) 2:21
2. "That’s When Miracles Occur" (Andy Pratt) 3:07
3. "Early Mornin’ Strangers" (Barry Manilow, Hal David) 3:40
4. "Mr. Blue (Misty Blue)" (Michael Franks) 3:29
5. "Too Many Mornings" (Bill Quateman) 4:40
6. "At the Ballet" (Marvin Hamlisch, Edward Kleban) 6:27
7. "The Moon Is All Alone (Like Me)" (Michel Colombier, Lani Hall, E. Colombier) 3:22
8. "Dolphins Lullaby" (Rick Roberts) 4:17
9. "Sweet Bird" (Joni Mitchell) 2:53

== Album credits ==
=== Performance credits ===
- Lani Hall - all vocals
- Michel Colombier - all keyboards
- Larry Carlton - guitar
- Lee Ritenour - guitar
- Dennis Budimir - guitar
- Chuck Domanico, Arnie Egilsson, Buell Neidlinger - bass guitar
- Stanley Clarke - bass guitar on "Send in the Clowns"
- Jim Keltner - drums, percussion
- Milt Holland - percussion
- Herb Alpert - trumpet solo on "Mr. Blue"
- John Audino, Bobby Shew, Anthony Terran - trumpet
- Vincent De Rosa, David Duke, Robert Henderson - french horn
- Charles Loper, Lew McCreary - trombone
- Israel Baker, Samuel Boghossian, David Frisina, Irving Geller, George Kast, Jacob Krachmalnick, Marvin Limonick, Alfred Lustgarten - violin
- Erno Neufeld, Wilbert Nuttycombe, Stanley Plummer, Jerome Reisler, Nathan Ross, Sheldon Sanov, Mari Tsumura, Gerald Vinci, Shari Zippert - violin
- Marilyn Baker, Pamela Goldsmith, Allan Harshman, Virginia Majewski, Gareth Nuttycombe, Robert Ostrowsky - viola
- Larry Morgan - woodwind
- Jerome Richardson, Clifford Shank - flute
- Earl Dumler - oboe
- Gayle Levant - harp
- Edgar Lustgarten, Jacqueline Lustgarten, Kathleen Lustgarten, Frederick Seykora - cello

=== Technical credits ===
- Michael Boddicker - synthesizer programmer
- Bruce Swedien - microphone
