= Bill Elliott (musician) =

American pianist, bandleader, composer, and orchestrator

- Birth name: William F. Elliott
- Born: October 2, 1951 (age 73); Wayland, Massachusetts, U.S.
- Genres: Jazz, musical theater
- Occupation(s): Pianist, orchestrator, composer, bandleader
- Instrument: Piano
- Years active: 1970s–present

Bill Elliott (born William F. Elliott; October 2, 1951) is an American pianist, bandleader, Hollywood composer and Broadway orchestrator. In 2015, he won a Tony Award for best orchestration for the Broadway musical, An American in Paris. In 2012 he was nominated for both Tony and Grammy awards for Broadway's Nice Work if You Can Get It. Elliott won Drama Desk Award for Outstanding Orchestrations in 2017 for the Broadway Musical Bandstand.

Elliott began as a Los Angeles studio musician, recording with artists such as Stevie Nicks, Smokey Robinson, Donna Summer, Bette Midler, and others. In his 20s he was the pianist in Bonnie Raitt's band. His career in contemporary pop music gradually and serendipitously turned toward orchestration of films, television, and then Broadway musicals. Films that feature Elliott's music include Dick Tracy, Nixon, Contact, Independence Day and Wedding Crashers. He has written music for Disney's video sequels to Aladdin, Beauty and the Beast and The Lion King, and for the television shows Northern Exposure, Ellen and Gilmore Girls.

At age 42, he formed "The Bill Elliott Swing Orchestra", which has performed on movie soundtracks and on record albums for prominent artists.

As of 2016, Elliott is on the faculty of Boston's Berklee College of Music. He has written over 50 arrangements for the Boston Pops Orchestra and has been guest conductor for the symphony orchestras of seven major cities.

== Early years ==
Elliott grew up in Wayland, Massachusetts, about 20 miles west of Boston. In 1969, he graduated from Wayland High School, where he played clarinet in the school band. Encouraged by director George Doren, Elliott wrote his first orchestrations for the band to play at football game halftimes. Even as a teenager, he liked swing music, and learned to play Fats Waller-style stride piano, but at the time, this was little more than a hobby because his real interest was the pop music of the day. His piano skills showed early, and he quickly became a favored keyboardist for artists around the Boston area. Other than high school music instruction, Elliott is basically self-taught. He did not attend college. He said, "I was impatient." "I just wanted to be a musician".

In 1969, at age 18, he was invited to come to Los Angeles to perform on a recording by one of his Massachusetts friends, John Compton, who was making his first studio album called In California. In an interview 40 years later, Compton said of Elliott, "Bill only needs to hear a song once and he already knows it perfectly. He's like a modern-day Mozart, and really looked the part back then." Soon, Elliott decided to move to Los Angeles. He had some significant early success performing in a country-rock band called The Rowan Brothers, named for Elliott's hometown friends Lorin and Chris Rowan who had moved to California. He performed on their 1972 album The Rowan Brothers, featuring Jerry Garcia and produced by bluegrass mandolinist David Grisman. (Note: Grisman was credited under the pseudonym "David Diadem." The album also featured steel guitar virtuoso Buddy Emmons.) The band was successful enough to perform as the opening act for The Grateful Dead at San Francisco's Fillmore West in 1971. He also played with other California bands, such as Seatrain and Marblehead.

Elliott moved back to Boston in the mid 1970s and toured with some popular acts of the day, including Livingston Taylor (brother of James Taylor), Jonathan Taylor and Tom Rush. Elliott's first big band writing was for a show performed by actor/comedian Martin Mull. Elliott said, "The show covered many musical styles, including swing, country, and r&b. It was a real education learning how to arrange for these distinct genres on the fly."

In 1977, at age 26, he returned to L.A., which was his home base while touring as a member of Bonnie Raitt's band for about two years. Between tours he found work making demo recordings for music publishers; this work honed his skills—enough for Elliott to enter into a select group of elite recording keyboardists, that allowed him to focus on studio work and to stop touring. Elliott was booked on sessions to record with artists including Stevie Nicks, Donna Summer, America, Robbie Dupree, and Smokey Robinson.

== Finding a niche ==
In his 30s, punk rock and new wave music was coming in style, but Elliott could not imagine himself playing that type of music. He began to focus more on writing and orchestrating, working for free at first, doing musical scores for low-budget films. He developed this skill by teaching himself. He said, "I learned by doing. I learned arranging on the fly, just trying it out."

A break came when some Boston friends, who were working on a movie, asked him if he could write something for it. The film was Dick Tracy starring Warren Beatty, and it needed a 1930s swing-type tune. This was a type of music that Elliott always liked anyway, but for years had kept separate from his pop career. In essence, he was now being asked to write new music that sounded like old music. He said, "Here was something I excelled at, and few others were doing it." He traveled back to Boston and recorded the song "Pep, Vim, and Verve" for the movie sound track. Later, he obtained jobs arranging music for Disney Studios, including video sequels to Aladdin, Beauty and the Beast and The Lion King. He wrote for TV's Northern Exposure, Ellen, the Drew Carey Show and ABC's The Shirley Temple Story.

== The Bill Elliott Swing Orchestra ==
At age 42, Elliot formed "The Bill Elliott Swing Orchestra", a 19-member band based in Los Angeles. It included some of LA's finest musicians with whom Elliott had become acquainted. The first performance was in 1993 at the Hollywood Roosevelt Hotel. Taking advantage of a swing dance revival in the 1990s, the band attracted dancers of the Jitterbug and the Lindy Hop initially, but the orchestra gained stature and acceptance to the point of being featured on film soundtracks and albums of major artists. Examples include Midnight, a jazz album by Diane Schuur that was written and produced by Barry Manilow; and the HBO film Introducing Dorothy Dandridge, starring Halle Berry, which featured Elliott's orchestra on the soundtrack. The orchestra accompanied John Lithgow and Bebe Neuwirth on a children's album called Farkle and Friends. Lithgow collaborated with Elliott on other projects, such as the children's album, Singin' in the Bathtub, on which Elliott was conductor, orchestrator and performer. He also performed with Lithgow in live concerts for children featuring this work. By the late 1990s Elliott's career was almost exclusively focused on arranging, composing, and orchestrating for film, television, and children's music, with some time allotted for his orchestra.

== Academia ==
In his early 50s, Elliott's work on the west coast declined after 9/11, and he was thinking of returning to the Boston area. He was in Boston working on a movie and visited his old friend Livingston Taylor, who was then on the faculty at Boston's Berklee College of Music. Elliott then learned of a job opening there in the Contemporary Writing and Production Department. He was hardly an academic, yet Elliott had the real-world experience that suited the job perfectly, and he accepted the offer and began teaching at Berklee in 2004. As for his teaching methods, Elliott stated, "I teach them what works with players, how players like to work together, and how instruments work together." After returning to Boston, he soon began working with the Boston Pops Orchestra. Over the years, he has written more than 50 pieces for them including the orchestra's holiday shows and their Gershwin celebration tour.

In 2008, he was the music director for a PBS documentary with Michael Feinstein called The Sinatra Legacy which later received an Emmy nomination. This album impressed Ita Cahn, the widow of songwriter Sammy Cahn. She was then producing a musical play in San Diego — an updated version of the 1964 Sinatra/Crosby film called Robin and the 7 Hoods. She asked Elliott to orchestrate it and, through contacts he made doing that show, he was led to other theater work.

== Broadway ==
Elliott began writing for Broadway shows beginning about 2008. One of his original songs, "Bill's Bounce", was featured in the Broadway musical dance revue Swing!

He contributed additional orchestrations to the 2011 revival of Broadway's Anything Goes. In 2012 he was nominated for both Tony and Grammy awards for Nice Work if You Can Get It — the Tony nomination was for best orchestration, the Grammy nomination was for Best Musical Theater Album, for which Elliott was co-producer. Next was his orchestration for the 2013 adaptation of Rodgers and Hammerstein's Cinderella.

Elliott, along with co-writer Greg Anthony Rassen, won the Drama Desk Award for Outstanding Orchestrations in 2017 for the Broadway musical Bandstand.

In 2015 Elliott, along with two collaborators, Don Sebesky and Christofer Austin, won a Tony Award for his orchestration in the Broadway musical An American in Paris. The production attracted attention because its direction and choreography were done by a ballet choreographer with no previous experience directing musicals.

The production had already been performed in Paris for four months when Elliott was hired to adapt the music to better suit Broadway. "I was brought in to re-do some of the songs in a more theatrical way," Elliott said. In this process, the directors carefully study the audience during preview shows, then fine-tune the show based on what they feel the audience responds to. Changes in a dance routine require the music for that dance to be re-written. Elliott used his same routine here that he used with film — studying videos of the action. He worked on nearly half of the music in the final show. He said, "...it's more than just taking the notes and assigning them to an instrument. My work as an orchestrator is about bringing the emotions to life that are there and that are trying to be there." He said, "I felt like I was hired to put the 'American' in An American in Paris."

== Credits ==
| Year | Title | Role | Venue | Ref. |
|---|---|---|---|---|
| 1999 | Swing! | Featuring Songs by | Broadway, St. James Theatre | |
| 2011 | Anything Goes | Additional orchestrations | Broadway, Stephen Sondheim Theatre | |
| 2012 | Nice Work If You Can Get It | Orchestrator | Broadway, Imperial Theatre | |
| 2013 | Rodgers and Hammerstein's Cinderella | Additional orchestrations | Broadway, Broadway Theatre | |
| 2015 | An American in Paris | Additional orchestrations | Broadway, Palace Theatre | |
| 2017 | Bandstand | Co-orchestrator | Broadway, Bernard B. Jacobs Theatre | |

== Awards and nominations ==
| Year | Award | Category | Work | Result |
|---|---|---|---|---|
| 2008 | Emmy Award | PBS documentary | The Sinatra Legacy | Nominated |
| 2012 | Drama Desk Award | Outstanding Orchestrations | Nice Work if You Can Get It | Nominated |
| 2012 | Tony Award | Best Orchestrations | Nice Work if You Can Get It | Nominated |
| 2012 | Grammy Award | Best Musical Theater Album | Nice Work if You Can Get It | Nominated |
| 2015 | Tony Award | Best Orchestrations | An American in Paris | Won |
| 2017 | Tony Award | Best Orchestrations | Bandstand | Nominated |
| 2017 | Drama Desk Award | Outstanding Orchestration | Bandstand | Won |
