= Stained Glass Morning =

Studio album by Scott McKenzie
- Released: 1970
- Genre: Folk
- Length: 39:50
- Label: Ode
- Producer: David Anderle

Scott McKenzie chronology
The Voice of Scott McKenzie (1967)	Stained Glass Morning (1970)

Singles from Stained Glass Morning
- 1. "Going Home Again"/"Take a Moment" Released: December 1970

Professional ratings
Review scores
Source	Rating
Allmusic	2.5/5 stars

Stained Glass Morning is the second and last album by Scott McKenzie, released in 1970. It is notable for the work of "sterling backup players, including Ry Cooder, Rusty Young (of Poco), and Barry McGuire." The album did not chart on the Billboard 200.

One single was released off the album, "Going Home Again", but it did not chart.

== Track listing ==
All songs written by Scott McKenzie.

1. "Look in the Mirror" – 3:37
2. "Yves" – 4:35
3. "Crazy Man" – 4:18
4. "1969" – 3:00
5. "Dear Sister" – 5:19
6. "Going Home Again" – 3:37
7. "Stained Glass Morning" – 4:57
8. "Illusion" – 4:49
9. "Take a Moment" – 5:38

== Personnel ==
- Scott McKenzie – vocals, 12-string guitar, electric piano
- Ry Cooder – electric and acoustic bottleneck
- Rusty Young – pedal steel guitar
- Barry McGuire – harmonica
- Colin Cameron, Max Bennett - bass
- Chuck Domanico - acoustic bass
- Craig Doerge - piano, organ, harpsichord, electric piano
- Walter Foutz - organ
- Mac Elsensohn - drums
- Bunk Gardner - saxophone
- Edgar Lustgarten - cello
- Brooks Hunnicutt, David Mani, Dorothy Durr, Girls of Pittsburgh Manor, Jeffrey Thomas, Julia Tillman Waters, Lorna Willard, Robert Markland - backing vocals

=== Technical ===
- Bart Chiate, David Anderle, Henry Lewy - engineer
