= Double or Nothing (Lani Hall album) =

Studio album by Lani Hall
- Released: 1979
- Label: A&M
- Producer: Herb Alpert, Lani Hall

Lani Hall chronology
Sweet Bird (1976)	Double or Nothing (1979)	Blush (1980)

Double or Nothing is the fourth album by Lani Hall.

== Track listing ==
1. "Nobody Gets This Close to Me" (Steve Diamond) 4:20
2. "Shot in the Dark" (Bill Quateman) 3:38
3. "Meni Devol" (Ruben Rada, Hugo Fattoruso; English translation by Lani Hall) 5:10
4. "To the Morning" (Dan Fogelberg) 3:57
5. "Sailing Without a Sail" (Bill LaBounty, Roy Freeland) 3:12
6. "Double or Nothing" (Allee Willis, Skip Scarborough) 4:48
7. "Sunshine After the Rain" (Ellie Greenwich) 4:42
8. "To Know" (Buzz Feiten) 4:25
9. "So Long" (Lani Hall, Neil Larsen) 2:57
10. "Magic Garden" (Buzz Feiten) 3:46

== Album credits ==
=== Performance credits ===
- Lani Hall - vocals and backing vocals on 7, 8, 10)
- Neil Larsen - keyboards, backing vocals
- Buzz Feiten - guitar, backing vocals
- Chuck Domanico - bass
- Peter Donald - drums
- Manolo Badrena - percussion
- Jerry Knight - bass on 1,2,6,10
- Larry Tolbert - drums, percussion on 1,2,6,10
- Paulinho da Costa - percussion on 4, 7
- Michel Colombier - electric piano & synthesizer on 8
- Michael Boddicker - synthesizer programmer
- Airto Moreira - chanting and percussion on 3
- Ernie Watts - saxophone solo on 7
- Tim May - guitar on 4, 8
- Bill Champlin, Carmen Twillie, Venetta Gould - backing vocals on 4,5,7
- Bill Quateman - backing vocals on 2
- David Lasley, Arnold McCuller - backing vocals on 1,6
- Jerry Hey, Ernie Watts, Larry Williams, Gary Grant, Bill Reichenbach Jr. - horn section
