= Cyril (album) =

Studio album by Cyril Havermans
- Released: 1973
- Recorded: March 28 – April 15, 1973
- Studios: MGM Studios in Los Angeles, California
- Length: 27:28
- Label: MGM

Cyril Havermans chronology
Cyril (1973)	Mind Wave (1974)

Cyril is the debut studio album by Dutch singer-songwriter Cyril Havermans. It was recorded in 1973 after Havermans left Dutch progressive rock band Focus. The parting was amicable and came about partly as a result of Havermans' desire to include more vocal content (Focus are primarily an instrumental band). His erstwhile band-mates contribute much instrumentation to the album.

The songs are, for the most part, short acoustic guitar driven numbers and bear little resemblance to Focus material (Havermans did not write for the band). The lyrics are in English, apart from the traditional song "The Humpbacked Flute Player".

== Track listing ==
All tracks composed by Cyril Havermans except where noted

1. "A Long Line of Goodbyes" – 2:09
2. "A Charm of Love Can Be" – 2:50
3. "Theme for an Imaginary Lady" – 4:33
4. "Ev'ry Day (Just For You)" – 2:40
5. "Share Those Dreams" – 3:01
6. "Get Yourself By" – 2:08
7. "The Humpbacked Flute Player" (traditional) – 3:18
8. "Lady Sad Song" – 3:30
9. "There's a Pain" – 2:37
10. "Broken Dreams" – 2:42

== Personnel ==
- Cyril Havermans – vocals, acoustic guitar, bass guitar
- Jan Akkerman – electric guitar
- Thijs van Leer – electric piano, flute, organ
- Pierre van der Linden – drums
- John D'Andrea – piano
- Chuck Domanico – acoustic bass
- Emil Richards – percussion
- Jackie Ward – backing vocals
- Andrea Willis – backing vocals
- Maxine Willard – backing vocals
