= Timeless (Diane Schuur album) =

Live album by Diane Schuur
- Released: 1986
- Recorded: 1986
- Genre: Jazz
- Length: 48:28
- Label: GRP Records
- Producer: Dave Grusin, Larry Rosen

Diane Schuur chronology
Schuur Thing (1985)	Timeless (1986)	Diane Schuur & the Count Basie Orchestra (1987)

Professional ratings
Review scores
Source	Rating
Allmusic	4/5 stars

Timeless is a 1986 album by Diane Schuur, accompanied by a big band, arranged by Billy May, Johnny Mandel, Patrick Williams and Jeremy Lubbock.

At the Grammy Awards of 1987, for her performance on Timeless, Schuur won her first Grammy Award for Best Jazz Vocal Performance, Female.

== Track listing ==
1. "How Long Has This Been Going On?" (George Gershwin, Ira Gershwin) – 4:25
2. "You'd Be So Easy to Love" (Cole Porter) – 2:57
3. "Come Rain or Come Shine" (Harold Arlen, Johnny Mercer) – 4:57
4. "How About Me?" (Irving Berlin) – 4:30
5. "Do Nothin' Till You Hear from Me" (Duke Ellington, Bob Russell) – 3:41
6. "A Time for Love" (Johnny Mandel, Paul Francis Webster) – 5:43
7. "I Can't Believe That You're in Love With Me" (Clarence Gaskill, Jimmy McHugh) – 3:31
8. "Please Send Me Someone to Love" (Percy Mayfield) – 2:50
9. "Impossible" (Steve Allen) – 4:51
10. "Travellin' Blues" (Dave Brubeck, Iola Brubeck, Lerner) – 3:56
11. "Too Late Now" (Burton Lane, Alan Jay Lerner) – 4:13
12. "Don't Like Goodbyes" (Arlen, Truman Capote) – 3:55

== Personnel ==
- Diane Schuur – vocals, piano
