= Midnight (Diane Schuur album) =

Studio album by Diane Schuur
- Released: July 22, 2003
- Recorded: 2003
- Genre: Jazz
- Length: 48:28
- Label: Concord Records
- Producer: Barry Manilow and Eddie Arkin

Diane Schuur chronology
Swingin' for Schuur (2001)	Midnight (2003)	Schuur Fire (2005)

Professional ratings
Review scores
Source	Rating
Allmusic	4/5 stars

Midnight is a 2003 album by Diane Schuur, of songs written by Barry Manilow.

== Track listing ==
1. "Meet Me, Midnight" (Bruce Sussman) – 2:58
2. "When October Goes" (Johnny Mercer) – 4:49
3. "Stay Away from Bill" (Eddie Arkin, Sussman) – 3:49
4. "I'll Be There" (Arkin, Marty Panzer) – 4:19
5. "Consider the Point from Both Ends" (Adrienne Anderson, Arkin) – 4:12
6. "What Is Love?" (Arkin) – 3:31
7. "He Loved Me" (Arkin, Panzer) – 4:06
8. "Southwind" (Mercer) – 2:39
9. "Our Love Will Always Be There" (Anderson, Arkin) – 3:32
10. "No Heartache Tonight" (Arkin) – 3:32
11. "Good-Bye My Love" (Anderson) – 3:58
12. "Life Is Good" (Panzer) – 4:02
13. "Anytime" – 3:01

All songs written by Barry Manilow, co-writers indicated.

== Personnel ==
=== Performance ===
- Diane Schuur - vocals, piano
- Barry Manilow - vocals, arranger, producer, rhythm arrangements
- Bill Elliott Swing Orchestra:
- Chuck Berghofer - double bass
- Abraham Laboriel
- Bill Liston -clarinet, saxophone, tenor saxophone
- Peter Erskine - drums
- Harvey Mason
- Dan Higgins - flute, alto saxophone
- Eddie Arkin - guitar, arranger, producer, rhythm arrangements, orchestral arrangements
- Oscar Castro-Neves - guitar
- Anthony Wilson
- Tommy Morgan - harmonica
- Gayle Levant - harp
- Alan Estes - percussion, vibraphone
- Paulinho Da Costa - percussion
- Alan Broadbent - piano
- Randy Kerber
- Andy Martin - trombone
- Warren Luening - trumpet, flugelhorn
- Phillip Ingram - vocals, background vocals
- Yvonne Williams
- Karrin Allyson
- Brian McKnight

=== Production ===
- Bruce Dukov - concert master
- Jorge Calandrelli - conductor, rhythm arrangements, orchestral arrangements
- Joe Soldo - contractor, orchestra contractor
- Jill Simonsen - design
- Don Murray - engineer, mastering, mixing
- Patricia Arkin - executive producer
- Glen Barros
- John Burk
- Garry Kief
- Robert Vosgien - mastering
- Randee Saint Nicholas - photography
- Diego Uchitel
- Valerie Whitesell - production coordination
- Wil Donovan - studio assistant
- Bruce Monical
- Abbey Anna - art direction
- Charles Paakkari - assistant engineer
- Seth Presant
- Marc Hulett - assistant
