= Deedles (album) =

Studio album by Diane Schuur
- Released: 1984
- Recorded: 1984
- Studio: Kaye-Smith Studios, Seattle, Washington
- Genre: Vocal jazz
- Length: 41:26
- Label: GRP
- Producer: Dave Grusin; Larry Rosen

Diane Schuur chronology
Pilot of My Destiny (1982)	Deedles (1984)	Schuur Thing (1985)

Deedles is the second studio album by American singer and pianist Diane Schuur, recorded with producer Dave Grusin. The album was released in 1984 through the GRP Records label and was a moderate success, peaking at number 33 on the Billboard magazine jazz chart. It was also her first record released internationally.

== Critical reception ==
Professional ratings
Review scores
Source	Rating
AllMusic	3/5 stars
The Encyclopedia of Popular Music	3/5 stars
MusicHound Jazz: The Essential Album Guide	1/5 stars
The Rolling Stone Jazz & Blues Album Guide	2.5/5 stars

A Billboard reviewer noted that Schuur's voice is a strong, warm alto with deft phrasing and a lot of heart, and she skillfully combines popular songs with more recent hits. Cash Box magazine called the album an impressive novelty, and Schuur was called a talent with a wide vocal and emotional range who really knows how to sing.

== Track listing ==
No.	Title	Writer(s)	Length
1.	"The Very Thought of You"	Ray Noble	4:47
2.	"New York State of Mind"	Billy Joel	5:19
3.	"Teach Me Tonight"	Gene de Paul; Sammy Cahn	3:54
4.	"I'm Beginning to See the Light"	Don George; Duke Ellington; Harry James; Johnny Hodges	2:35
5.	"I'll Close My Eyes"	Billy Reid; Buddy Kaye	4:19
6.	"Reverend Lee"	Eugene McDaniels	4:13
7.	"I'm Just Foolin' Myself"	Jack Lawrence, Peter Tinturin	3:21
8.	"Rock Me on the Water"	Jackson Browne	4:58
9.	"Can't Stop a Woman in Love"	Barbara Wyrick; Richard Ripani	4:42
10.	"Amazing Grace"	Traditional	3:18
Total length:			41:26

== Personnel ==
- Diane Schuur - vocals, acoustic piano (10)
- Dave Grusin - acoustic piano, Fender Rhodes electric piano (5, 6, 10), Yamaha DX7 synthesizer (1–5, 7–9), Yamaha GS-2 synthesizer (6), Oberheim OB-Xa synthesizer (2, 3, 5, 7–10), percussion (2, 3, 6), arrangements, conductor, adaptation (10)
- Howard Roberts - guitar (all tracks but 10)
- Dan Dean - bass guitar (all tracks but 10)
- Moyes Lucas - drums (all tracks but 10)
- Stan Getz - tenor saxophone (2, 7)
- Steve Khan - electric guitar (8), acoustic guitar (8), guitar solo (9)
- Buddy Williams - Simmons electronic drums (8, 9)
- Gloria Agostini - harp
- David Nadien - concert master
- Barry Finclair, Charles Libove, Charles McCracken, Elena Barere, Gerald Tarack, Harry Lookofsky, Jan Mullen, Jean Ingraham, John Pintavalle, Julien C. Barber*, LaMar Alsop, Lewis Eley, Regis Iandiorio, Richard Locker, Richard Sortomme, Sue Pray, Theodore Israel - strings

Credits are adapted from the album's liner notes.

== Charts ==
Chart performance for Deedles
Chart (1985)	Peak position
US Top Jazz Albums (Billboard)	33
US Top 40 Jazz Albums (Cash Box)	30
