= Mind Wave =

Studio album by Cyril Havermans
- Released: 1974
- Recorded: 1974
- Label: MGM
- Producer: John D'Andrea

Cyril Havermans chronology
| Cyril (1973) | Mind Wave (1974) |

Mind Wave is the second studio album by Dutch musician Cyril Havermans released in 1974.

== Track listing ==
All songs are written by Cyril Havermans.

=== Side 1 ===
1. "Mind Wave (vocal)"
2. "Can't Go Back There"
3. "There's a Woman"
4. "Consultation Song"
5. "Blue Eyed Lady"

=== Side 2 ===
1. "Blue Boy"
2. "Fools Got You Running"
3. "Try to Use My Wings"
4. "My Time Your Dream"
5. "All Kind Of"
6. "Mind Wave (instrumental)"

== Personnel ==
- Cyril Havermans – vocals, acoustic guitar, electric guitar
- Herman Deinum – bass guitar, congas
- Rudy de Queljou – lead guitar
- Hans Lafaille – percussion
- John D'Andrea – keyboards

== Recording ==
- John D'Andrea – producer
- Tony Scotti – executive producer
- Eric Prestidge – engineer

Recorded at Morgan Studios, Brussels, Belgium

== Release history ==
| Region | Date | Label | Format | Catalog |
|---|---|---|---|---|
| Worldwide | 1974 | | stereo LP | |
