= Cyril Havermans =

Dutch musician

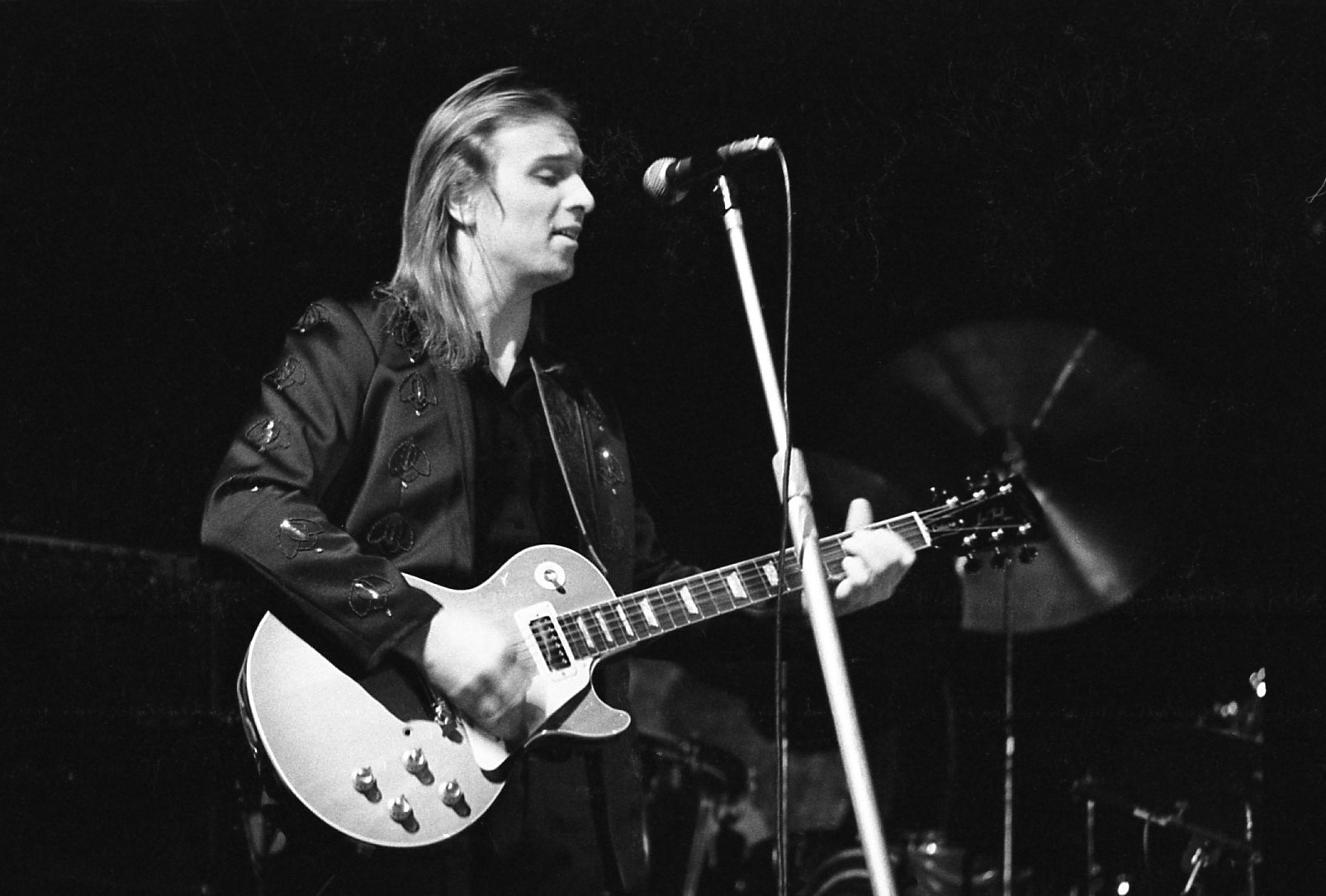

Background information
- Born: Cyriel Havermans
- Origin: Netherlands
- Genres: Progressive rock
- Occupations: Singer-songwriter, musician
- Instruments: Bass guitar, guitar
- Years active: 1960s–present

Cyril Havermans (born 20 October 1946, Breda, Netherlands) is a Dutch musician, best known for being in the progressive rock band Focus.

== Life ==
Cyril Havermans (birth name Cyriel Havermans) was the bassist and vocalist for a number of Dutch pop bands in the 1960s, using the stage name Carel Hagemans: Peter and the Beats (1965–66), The Heralds (1966–67), Special Concept (renamed to Spatial Concept) (1967–68), and Big Wheel (1968–1969). In 1969, he began to perform as Cyriel Havermans in live concerts in the Netherlands with members of the nascent Focus (Thijs van Leer, Martijn Dresden, and Hans Cleuver) as his backing band.

His tenure as bassist with the progressive rock band Focus lasted from late 1970 until September 1971 during which time he played many live concerts with the group and recorded Focus II (aka "Moving Waves"). In 1971 this LP won the Edison award, the Dutch equivalent to the Grammy, for best album of the year. According to Melody Maker magazine, it reached No. 2 in the UK charts in 1973, and spawned "Hocus Pocus", a top ten hit single in the US, UK, and many other territories worldwide. Aside from Cyriel's plaintive, wordless wailing on "Pupillae" from the Focus II LP's sidelong "Eruption" suite, his vocal talents found no other outlet on this mostly instrumental album.

He left the band to pursue a solo career playing melodic, acoustic guitar music with English lyrics. At this time Cyril dropped the 'e' from his first name. An eponymous album was released in 1973 with musical support from his old Focus bandmates Jan Akkerman, Thijs van Leer, and Pierre van der Linden. A second album, Mind Wave, followed in 1974, and Cyril's group was sometimes featured as an opening act for Focus' European concerts in 1975. He was a guest musician on Lucifer's "Margriet" album, released in 1977.

In 1983, he replaced André Reijnen as bassist in the oft-reunited Brainbox. In 2007, he played bass in the Group Three Pianos with brothers Paul and Tim Krempel. That same year Cyril sang and played bass guitar with ex-Brainbox members Kaz Lux and Rudy de Queljoe at the Blues and Roots Festival in Oosterhout, Netherlands, and June 2011 he guested with rhythm & blues band Cold Shot for a gig in Breda. In September 2012 he and Kaz Lux performed as a duo, also in Breda. In October 2016 he was interviewed and sang and played blues tunes on acoustic guitar on the BredaNu television show, On Stage.

== Discography ==
Focus

- Focus II (aka "Moving Waves") – Imperial 5C 056 24385 (1971)

Solo Work

- Cyril – MGM 2315 261 (1973)
- Mind Wave – MGM 2315 311 (1974)
