= Scott McKenzie =

American singer-songwriter (1939–2012)

- McKenzie performing on Germany's 50 Jahre Rock! Love Songs in 2004

Background information
- Born: Philip Wallach Blondheim III; January 10, 1939; Jacksonville, Florida, United States
- Died: August 18, 2012 (aged 73) Los Angeles, California, United States
- Genre: Pop
- Occupations: Singer; songwriter
- Instruments: Vocals; guitar
- Years active: 1950s–2010
- Labels: Capitol; Ode

Scott McKenzie (born Philip Wallach Blondheim III; January 10, 1939 – August 18, 2012) was an American singer and songwriter who recorded the 1967 hit single "San Francisco (Be Sure to Wear Some Flowers in Your Hair)".

== Early life ==
Philip Wallach Blondheim III was born in Jacksonville, Florida, on January 10, 1939, the son of Philip Wallach Blondheim Jr. and the former Dorothy Winifred Hudson. His family moved to Asheville, North Carolina, when he was six months old. He grew up in North Carolina and Alexandria, Virginia, where he became friends with John Phillips, the son of one of his mother's friends. In the mid-1950s, he sang briefly with Tim Rose in a high-school group named The Singing Strings. He graduated high school from St. Stephens School for Boys in Alexandria.

== Career ==
Later, with Phillips, Mike Boran and Bill Cleary, he formed the doo wop band The Abstracts.

In New York City, The Abstracts became The Smoothies and recorded two singles with Decca Records, produced by Milt Gabler. During his time with The Smoothies, Blondheim decided to change his name for business reasons:

"[We] were working at one of the last great night clubs, The Elmwood Casino in Windsor, Ontario. We were part of a variety show ... three acts, dancing girls, and the entire cast took part in elaborate, choreographed stage productions ... As you might imagine, after-show parties were common.
"At one of these parties I complained that nobody could understand my real name ... [and] pointed out that this was a definite liability in a profession that benefited from instant name recognition. Everyone started trying to come up with a new name for me. It was [comedian] Jackie Curtis who said he thought I looked like a Scottie dog. Phillips came up with Laura's middle name after Jackie's suggestion. (Note: McKenzie is referencing John Phillips' daughter MacKenzie Phillips, who was born Laura Mackenzie Phillips.) I didn't like being called 'Scottie' so everybody agreed my new name could be 'Scott McKenzie'."

In 1961, Phillips and McKenzie met Dick Weissman and formed the folk group The Journeymen at the height of the folk music craze. They recorded three albums and seven singles for Capitol Records. After The Beatles became popular in 1964, The Journeymen disbanded. McKenzie and Weissman became solo performers, while Phillips formed the group The Mamas & the Papas with Denny Doherty, Cass Elliot, and Michelle Phillips and moved to California.

McKenzie originally declined an opportunity to join the group, saying in a 1977 interview "I was trying to see if I could do something by myself. And I didn't think I could take that much pressure." Two years later, he left New York and signed with Lou Adler's Ode Records.

=== "San Francisco (Be Sure to Wear Some Flowers in Your Hair)" ===
"San Francisco (Be Sure to Wear Some Flowers in Your Hair)" (1967)

John Phillips wrote and co-produced "San Francisco (Be Sure to Wear Flowers in Your Hair)" for McKenzie. Phillips played guitar on the recording, and session musician Gary L. Coleman played orchestra bells and chimes. The bass line of the song was supplied by session musician Joe Osborn. Hal Blaine played drums.

It was released on May 13, 1967, in the United States and was an instant hit, reaching number 4 on the Billboard Hot 100 and number 2 in the Canadian RPM Magazine charts. It was also a number 1 in the UK and several other countries, selling over 7 million copies globally.

McKenzie released the single "Like an Old Time Movie", which Phillips wrote, composed, and produced, and which was a top-40 hit (number 24 on Billboard; number 27 in Canada). His first album, The Voice of Scott McKenzie, was followed with an album titled Stained Glass Morning. He stopped recording in the early 1970s, living in Joshua Tree, California, and Virginia Beach, Virginia.

In 1986, he started singing with a new version of The Mamas and the Papas. With John Phillips, he co-wrote "Kokomo" (with small contributions from Terry Melcher & Mike Love) (1988), a number 1 single for The Beach Boys.

By 1998, he had retired from the road version of The Mamas and the Papas, and resided in Los Angeles until his death. He appeared at the Los Angeles tribute concert for John Phillips in 2001, amongst other 1960s contemporary acts.

== Illness and Death ==
McKenzie developed Guillain–Barré syndrome in 2010, which lasted until his death.

He died on August 18, 2012, in Los Angeles, at the age of 73.

== Discography ==
=== Albums ===
Year	Album	Billboard 200	Record label
1967	The Voice of Scott McKenzie	127	Ode Records
1970	Stained Glass Morning	–	Ode Records

==== Other releases ====
- 1991: San Francisco – The Very Best of
- 1998: Spirit Voices
- 2001: Stained Glass Reflections: Anthology 1960–1970
- 2005: Superhits
- 2012: In Memoriam [EP]
- 2020: Ten Songs for You

=== Singles ===
Year	Title	Peak chart positions			Record label	B-side	Album
Year	Title	US	UK	CAN RPM	Record label	B-side	Album
1965	"Look in Your Eyes"	–	–	–	Capitol Records	"All I Want Is You"	Non-album single
1965	"There Stands the Glass"	–	–	–	Capitol Records	"Wipe the Tears (From Your Eyes)"	Non-album single
1966	"No, No, No, No, No"	–	–	–	Epic Records	"I Want to Be Alone"	The Voice of Scott McKenzie
1967	"San Francisco (Be Sure to Wear Flowers in Your Hair)"	4	1	2	Ode Records	"What's the Difference"	The Voice of Scott McKenzie
1967	"Look in Your Eyes" (re-release)	111	–	–	Capitol Records	"All I Want Is You"	
1967	"Like an Old Time Movie"	24	50	27	Ode Records	"What's the Difference - Chapter II"	The Voice of Scott McKenzie
1968	"Holy Man"	126	–	–	Ode Records	"What's the Difference (Chapter Three)"	Non-album single
1970	"Going Home Again"	–	–	–	Ode Records	"Take a Moment"	Stained Glass Morning

Other single releases

- 1989: San Francisco '89 [Remix '89]
- 2009: Gone to Sea Again [single download only]
- 2018: San Francisco (Live 1974) [single download only]
