= Schuur Fire =

Studio album by Diane Schuur
- Released: April 5, 2005
- Recorded: 2003
- Genre: Jazz
- Length: 48:28
- Label: Concord Records
- Producer: Oscar Castro-Neves

Diane Schuur chronology
Midnight (2003)	Schuur Fire (2005)	Diane Schuur: Live in London (2006)

Professional ratings
Review scores
Source	Rating
AllMusic	4/5 stars

Schuur Fire is a 2005 album by Diane Schuur, accompanied by the Caribbean Jazz Project.

== Track listing ==
1. "Lover, Come Back to Me" (Oscar Hammerstein II, Sigmund Romberg) – 4:50
2. "Don't Let Me Be Lonely Tonight" (James Taylor) – 4:05
3. "So in Love" (Cole Porter) – 6:29
4. "Look Around" (Alan Bergman, Marilyn Bergman, Sérgio Mendes) – 3:40
5. "I Can't Stop Loving You" (Don Gibson) – 3:32
6. "As" (Stevie Wonder) – 4:26
7. "More Than You Know" (Edward Eliscu, Billy Rose, Vincent Youmans) – 4:10
8. "Ordinary World" (Nicholas Bates, Warren Cuccurullo, Simon Le Bon, John Taylor) – 4:13
9. "Poinciana" (Buddy Bernier, Nat Simon) – 4:14
10. "Close Enough for Love" (Johnny Mandel, Paul Williams) – 3:54
11. "Confession" (Ivan Lins, Brenda Russell) – 4:21
12. "Yellow Days" (Alan Bernstein, Álvaro Carrillo) – 4:03

== Personnel ==
=== Performance ===
- Diane Schuur - vocals
- The Caribbean Jazz Project:
- Dave Samuels - arranger, marimba, vibraphone
- Oscar Stagnaro - double bass
- Mark Walker - drums
- Oscar Castro-Neves - guitar, arranger, producer, mixing
- Robert Quintero - percussion, conga
- Dario Eskenazi - piano
- Diego Urcola - trumpet, flugelhorn

=== Production ===
- Abbey Anna - art direction
- Charles Paakkari - assistant engineer
- Yutaka Engineer - editing, mixing
- Geoff Gillette - engineer, mixing
- David C. Britz - executive producer
- John Burk
- Hal Gaba
- Peggy Teague - make-up, hair stylist
- Bernie Grundman - mastering
- Danielle Brancazio - package design
- Norman Seeff - photography, cover choto
- Dan Steinberg - photography
- Anna Wyckoff - stylist
