= Schuur Thing =

Studio album by Diane Schuur
- Released: 1985
- Genre: Vocal jazz
- Length: 45:30
- Label: GRP
- Producer: Dave Grusin

Diane Schuur chronology
| Deedles (1984) | Schuur Thing (1985) | Timeless (1986) |

Singles from Schuur Thing
- 1. "By Design" Released: 1985

Schuur Thing is the third studio album by American singer and pianist Diane Schuur, released in 1985 through the GRP Records label. The album was arranged and produced by Dave Grusin.

== Critical reception ==
Professional ratings
Review scores
| Source | Rating |
|---|---|
| AllMusic | 4/5 stars |
| The Encyclopedia of Popular Music | 3/5 stars |
| MusicHound Jazz: The Essential Album Guide | 3/5 stars |

Ron Wynn of AllMusic noted Stan Getz's "excellent tenor saxophone; some good leads." A Billboard reviewer stated that "this classy jazz bred vocalist is surrounded by some very elegant Dave Grusin arrangements, creating a fine listening experience." Cash Box magazine called the album "a slick-as-glass, well-sung effort," noting the guest appearances. Chris Albertson of Stereo Review stated, "I am not saying that this is a great album - Schuur's voice deserves more compassionate accompaniment - but it does give her a chance to show off a considerable talent for handling a variety of material."

== Track listing ==
| No. | Title | Writer(s) | Length |
|---|---|---|---|
| 1. | "Needle in a Haystack" | Con Conrad; Herb Magidson | 3:13 |
| 2. | "By Design" (with José Feliciano) | Jodie Victor; Larry Prentiss; Steve Lane; Vince DiCola | 3:51 |
| 3. | "Love Dance" | Ivan Lins; Paul Williams; Vitor Martins | 5:35 |
| 4. | "Love You Back" | Randy Goodrum; Wayland Holyfield | 3:55 |
| 5. | "Someday We'll All Be Free" | Donny Hathaway; Eddie Howard, Jr. | 4:00 |
| 6. | "It Don't Mean a Thing If It Ain’t Got That Swing" | Duke Ellington; Irving Mills | 3:42 |
| 7. | "American Wedding Song" (with José Feliciano) | Eugene McDaniels | 4:25 |
| 8. | "Take Me to the River" | Al Green; Mabon Hodges | 5:17 |
| 9. | "Make a Plan" | Brent Maher; Goodrum | 3:38 |
| 10. | "No Time for True Love" | Goodrum | 3:38 |
| 11. | "Sure Thing" | Ira Gershwin; Jerome Kern | 3:16 |
| Total length: | | | 45:30 |

== Personnel ==
- Diane Schuur - vocals
- José Feliciano - lead vocals (2, 7)
- Stan Getz - tenor saxophone (3, 6)
- Dave Grusin - keyboards (1, 3–10), synthesizers (1, 2, 5, 7), string arrangements, conductor
- Larry Williams - synthesizers (2, 4, 8, 9)
- Lee Ritenour - electric guitars (1, 4, 8, 9)
- Abraham Laboriel - bass guitar (1–5, 7–10)
- Chuck Domanico - bass (6)
- Carlos Vega - drums
- Paulinho Da Costa - percusion (4–6, 9)

== Charts ==
=== Weekly charts ===
Weekly chart performance for Schuur Thing
| Chart (1986) | Peak position |
|---|---|
| US Top Jazz Albums (Billboard) | 10 |
| US Top 40 Jazz Albums (Cash Box) | 4 |

=== Year-end charts ===
Year-end chart performance for Schuur Thing
| Chart (1986) | Peak position |
|---|---|
| US Top Jazz Albums (Billboard) | 30 |
| US Top 30 Jazz Albums (Cash Box) | 12 |
