= Pure Schuur =

Studio album by Diane Schuur
- Released: 1991
- Genre: Vocal jazz; traditional pop
- Length: 47:25
- Label: GRP
- Producer: Andre Fischer

Diane Schuur chronology
Collection (1989)	Pure Schuur (1991)	In Tribute (1992)

Pure Schuur is the sixth studio album by American singer and pianist Diane Schuur, released in 1991 on the GRP Records label. It was nominated for a Grammy Award for Best Traditional Pop Vocal Album.

== Critical reception ==
Professional ratings
Review scores
Source	Rating
AllMusic	4/5 stars
The Encyclopedia of Popular Music	3/5 stars
MusicHound Jazz: The Essential Album Guide	2.5/5 stars
The Rolling Stone Jazz & Blues Album Guide	2.5/5 stars

Jonathan Widran of AllMusic wrote that Diane Schuur has always been one of the greatest voices of modern jazz in the world, and her purity in this collection makes her performance the most artistic and at the same time accessible to date. A reviewer of Billboard magazine noted that by combining originals and standards, Schuur achieves mostly successful results, however, in rare cases when she tries to expand the possibilities of her jazz base, melodies are not always able to support her voluminous vocals. Cash Box magazine stated that, like Nancy Wilson, Schuur sings jazz, pop and rhythm and blues equally well, which she demonstrates on her latest disc.

== Track listing ==
No.	Title	Writer(s)	Length
1.	"Nobody Does Me"	Rod Temperton	5:10
2.	"All Caught Up in Love"	Marvin Hamlisch; Siedah Garrett	4:54
3.	"Deed I Do"	Fred Rose; Walter Hirsch	2:19
4.	"What a Difference a Day Makes"	María Grever; Stanley Adams	4:54
5.	"Touch"	David Lawrence; Faye Greenberg; Steve Lane	6:10
6.	"Baby You Got What It Takes"	Berry Gordy; Gwendolyn Fequa; Roquel Davis	4:32
7.	"Unforgettable"	Irving Gordon	3:56
8.	"I Could Get Used to This"	Ellen Silverstein	4:54
9.	"You Don’t Remember Me"	Dick Winzeler; Steve Lane	3:16
10.	"Hold Out"	Vonda Shepard	4:25
11.	"We Can Only Try"	Carroll Coates; Peter Daniels	3:15
Total length:			47:25

== Charts ==
=== Weekly charts ===
Weekly chart performance for Pure Schuur
Chart (1991)	Peak position
US Top Contemporary Jazz Albums (Billboard)	1
US Top Pop Albums (Billboard)	148

=== Year-end charts ===
Year-end chart performance for Pure Schuur
Chart (1991)	Peak position
US Top Contemporary Jazz Albums (Billboard)	3
