= Oversinging =

Term used for certain vocal styles

Oversinging is a term, sometimes derogatory, aimed at vocal styles that dominate the music they are performed in, including melisma and belting, and overuse of embellishments on one sound.

== Definition ==
Professor and voice instructor Melinda Imthurn writes:

"Since oversinging is not a technical term, it's hard to define. To one person it might mean pushing the voice beyond healthy singing technique, while to another it might mean embellishing a song too much, sometimes to the point where the melody is no longer recognizable."

Oversinging is not a word found in common dictionaries, but it is a well-known phenomenon. Some forms of oversinging, especially in the United States, can be traced and attributed to renowned soloists in the 1980s like Whitney Houston.

There are different opinions on what oversinging implies, though it is commonly recognized as one or both of the following:

- Belting to an extreme by singing too loud by pushing one's singing voice "too much" (straining), or singing into a higher or lower range than is comfortable for one's voice (beyond one's useful vocal range).
- Excessive use of runs, whoops, vocal falsettos and melisma.

Oversinging can be technically understood as pushing too much breath pressure through the larynx, which is known as overblowing of the vocal folds. The result is the over-production of sound. Oversinging may also be termed "vocal gymnastics" when referring to usage of melisma. Hollywood vocal coach Roger Burnley describes this type of oversinging as "using too many riffs, runs, and embellishments".

Singers who try to impress or show off their vocal abilities may turn to this kind of singing.

== Critique ==
Many complain that contestants in shows such as Idol tend to oversing, and blame some of the most prominent American female singers for inspiring them. Some say it has been a rising trend following the many singing contests that started appearing in the early 2000s, especially in the United States. Essentially, oversinging can be considered a style, as trained vocalists might also use this technique.

Mariah Carey, Whitney Houston, Christina Aguilera, Kelly Clarkson, Ariana Grande, and Céline Dion are well known for their heavy use of melisma and belting, and the term "oversinging" is most often applied to well loved singers such as the aforementioned by people who feel negatively towards the singers of the style. This criticism is mainly focused on too much "vocal gymnastics" which some feel degrades the artistic merits of the song, and not necessarily that they strain their voices too much.

While [Roger] Burnley believes all of those divas to be oversingers in their own right, [Hollywood vocal coach, Chrys] Page argues the opposite. "They don't oversing, but some young hopefuls, trying to sound exactly like those artists, consistently do it because they haven't yet found their own voice and style," he said.

When amateurs on shows such as American Idol are criticized for oversinging, it can be both because they use far too great "vocal gymnastics" and strain their voice beyond their vocal capability when trying to mimic famous singers with far greater vocal ranges and training.

Professional opera singer Sarah-Jane Dale on Whitney Houston's use of melisma: "You can't do it without proper breath control, and that's the one thing that Whitney Houston had bags of. Let's face it, singers like that do not come along every week."

== Vocal damage ==
Straining the singing voice, for instance by using belting without proper coordination, can lead to forcing, which in turn can cause vocal deterioration, known as fatigue of the vocal cords, also known as vocal fatigue. Straining the voice can lead the development of vocal nodules, a form of scarring on the vocal cords caused by strenuous or abusive voice practices. Professional singers on extended tours with tight schedules run a substantial risk of damaging their voices unless they make sure to rest the vocal cords and get enough sleep and proper diet.

Some famous singers known to have developed vocal nodules are Luciano Pavarotti, Whitney Houston, Mariah Carey, Freddie Mercury, and Joss Stone.

Singers known to have had their vocal nodules surgically treated include Justin Timberlake, Sam Smith, Tove Lo, Adele, Björk, Shirley Manson, Keith Urban, John Mayer and Rod Stewart. Julie Andrews is well known for her singing voice being permanently damaged by the surgery. Elton John is notable for having vocal surgery, as it caused his voice to significantly deepen.

Research by Massachusetts General Hospital which analysed a group of elite singers who suffered vocal cord damage, with a total of 240 Grammy award nominations among them, showed that 90% of those injuries was the result of vocal trauma and overuse.
