= Pilot of My Destiny =

Studio album by Diane Schuur
- Released: 1982
- Genre: Jazz
- Length: 42:01
- Label: First American / Music Is Medicine
- Producer: Bob Krinsky

Diane Schuur chronology
| Pilot of My Destiny (1982) | Deedles (1984) |

Pilot of My Destiny is the debut studio album by American singer and pianist Diane Schuur, released in 1982 through the independent label First American Records. The album was recorded in 1981 in Seattle, and includes some of her original compositions.

== Critical reception ==
Michael Hoffman of the Arizona Daily Star stated that the album suffered from "poor production and distribution", so it did not have very good results. A Billboard reviewer wrote: "Ten pleasantly listenable cuts are sung by this Tacoma lady, who also plays right nice piano with an eight-piece backup band. Standouts are 'Life Goes On' and 'In Your Own Sweet Way'".

== Track listing ==
Side A
| No. | Title | Writer(s) | Length |
|---|---|---|---|
| 1. | "'Round Midnight" | Bernie Hanighen; Cootie Williams; Thelonious Monk | 5:09 |
| 2. | "Love Conquers All" | Allan Landon; Arnold Ahlert | 3:39 |
| 3. | "Black Coffee" | Sonny Burke; Paul Francis Webster | 3:18 |
| 4. | "Zaius" | Eddie Russ; J. James Jarrett | 2:52 |
| 5. | "Seven Steps to Heaven" | Miles Davis; Victor Feldman | 4:03 |

Side B
| No. | Title | Writer(s) | Length |
|---|---|---|---|
| 1. | "Life Goes On" | Diane Schuur | 3:04 |
| 2. | "Pilot of My Destiny" | Schuur | 4:23 |
| 3. | "In Your Own Sweet Way" | Dave Brubeck; Iola Brubeck | 7:58 |
| 4. | "She" | Chris Ethridge; Gram Parsons | 3:39 |
| 5. | "Strokin' the Night Away" | J.W. Helfand | 2:52 |

== Personnel ==
- Diane Schuur – vocals, keyboards
- Dan Dean – bass
- Dave Peterson – bass (A1, A3, A5), guitar (A1, A5)
- Chris Leighton – drums
- Alan Toto – guitar (A2, B2, B4)
- Ted Brancato – keyboards
- Bob Krinsky – production, recording
- Gary Herbig – tenor saxophone, flute, alto flute
- Julian Priester – trombone
- Richard Person – trumpet

Credits are adapted from the album's liner notes.
