= Friends for Schuur =

Studio album by Diane Schuur
- Released: September 26, 2000
- Recorded: 2000
- Genre: Jazz
- Length: 48:28
- Label: Concord Records
- Producer: Phil Ramone

Diane Schuur chronology
Music Is My Life (1999)	Friends for Schuur (2000)	Swingin' for Schuur (2001)

Professional ratings
Review scores
Source	Rating
Allmusic	4/5 stars

Friends for Schuur is a 2000 album by Diane Schuur, produced by Phil Ramone, featuring duets with Ray Charles and Stevie Wonder. It was Schuur's debut album for Concord Records. The album peaked at #22 on the Billboard Contemporary Jazz Albums chart.

== Track listing ==
1. "Easy Living" (Ralph Rainger, Leo Robin) – 4:26
2. "I'd Fly" (Riccardo Cocciante, Jean Paul Drean, Roxanne Seeman) – 5:07
3. "For the First Time" (Gerry Goffin, Ken Hirsch) – 4:44
4. "It Might Be You" (Alan Bergman, Marilyn Bergman, Dave Grusin) – 4:58
5. "Love Like Ours" (A. Bergman, M. Bergman, Grusin) – 4:20
6. "Red Cab to Manhattan" (Steven Bishop) – 6:01
7. "The Heart Never Learns" (Jorge Casas, Lawrence Dermer) – 4:19
8. "Never Take That Chance Again" (Burt Bacharach, Tonio K) – 4:41
9. "It Had to Be You" (Isham Jones, Gus Kahn) – 5:29
10. "I Just Called to Say I Love You" (Stevie Wonder) – 4:35
11. "Finally" (Stephanie Andrews, Wonder) – 6:55

== Personnel ==
- Diane Schuur – vocals, piano

=== 1 Easy Living ===
Acoustic Bass	Chuck Berghofer
Drums	Gregg Field
Guitar	Mike Landau
Piano	Alan Broadbent
Synthesizer	Randy Waldman
Sax	Stan Getz
Vocals	Diane Schuur

=== 2 I’d Fly ===
Acoustic Bass	Jim Hughart
Drums	Gregg Field
Guitar	Michael Thompson
Piano	Alan Broadbent
Synthesizer	Randy Waldman
Percussion	Paulinho Da Costa
Vocals	Riccardo Cocciante
Vocals	Diane Schuur

=== 3 For The First Time ===
Acoustic Bass	Chuck Berghofer
Drums	Gregg Field
Guitar	Michael Thompson
Piano	Alan Broadbent
Synthesizer	Randy Waldman
Vocals	Diane Schuur

=== 4 It Might Be You ===
Acoustic Bass	Chuck Berghofer
Drums	Harvey Mason Sr
Guitar	Dean Parks
Piano	Dave Grusin
Synthesizer	Randy Waldman
Background Vocals	Curtis King Jr
Background Vocals	Vaneese Thomas
Vocals	Alan Bergman
Vocals	Diane Schuur

=== 5 Love Like Ours ===
Acoustic Bass	Chuck Berghofer
Drums	Harvey Mason Sr
Guitar	Dean Parks
Piano	Dave Grusin
Synthesizer	Randy Waldman
Vocals	Diane Schuur

=== 6 Red Cab To Manhattan ===
Acoustic Bass	Chuck Berghofer
Drums	Gregg Field
Guitar	Dean Parks
Guitar	Mike Landau
Piano	Alan Broadbent
Synthesizer	Randy Waldman
Vocals	Stephen Bishop
Vocals	Diane Schuur

=== 7 The Heart Never Learns ===
Acoustic Bass	Chuck Berghofer
Drums	Gregg Field
Guitar	Mike Landau
Piano	Alan Broadbent
Synthesizer	Randy Waldman
Vocals	Diane Schuur

=== 8 Never Take That Chance Again ===
Acoustic Bass	Chuck Berghofer
Drums	Gregg Field
Guitar	Mike Landau
Piano	Alan Broadbent
Synthesizer	Randy Waldman
Percussion	Paulinho Da Costa
Background Vocals	Curtis King Jr
Background Vocals	Vaneese Thomas
Vocals	Diane Schuur

=== 9 It Had To Be You ===
Bass	Tom Fowler
Drums	Peter Turre
Piano	Diane Schuur
Synthesizer	Ray Charles
Vocals	Ray Charles
Vocals	Diane Schuur

=== 10 I Just Called To Say I Love You ===
Bass	Alex Al
Drums	Terry Lyne Carrington
Guitar	Randy Jacobs
Piano	Herbie Hancock
Synthesizer	Greg Phillinganes
Background Vocals	Rob Mathes
Vocals	Diane Schuur

=== 11 Finally ===
Acoustic Bass	Chuck Berghofer
Drums	Gregg Field
Guitar	Dean Parks
Synthesizer	Randy Waldman
Harmonica	Stevie Wonder
Vocals	Stevie Wonder
Vocals	Diane Schuur

=== Other Musicians ===
Vocals – The Rob Mathes Voices (Track 10)
