= Blues for Schuur =

Studio album by Diane Schuur
- Released: 1997
- Genre: Blues
- Length: 50:32
- Label: GRP
- Producer: Al Schmitt

Diane Schuur chronology
Love Walked In (1996)	Blues for Schuur (1997)	The Best of Diane Schuur (1997)

Blues for Schuur is the eleventh studio album by American singer and pianist Diane Schuur, recorded with producer Al Schmitt and arranger Greg Adams. It was released in 1997 through GRP Records.

== Critical reception ==
Professional ratings
Review scores
Source	Rating
AllMusic	4/5 stars
The Encyclopedia of Popular Music	3/5 stars
MusicHound Jazz: The Essential Album Guide	3/5 stars
The Rolling Stone Jazz & Blues Album Guide	4/5 stars

Scott Yanow of AllMusic praised the album, noting that Schuur sounds great throughout this rousing date with the support of the band, which emphasizes the bluesy mood, although solos are played from time to time, the emphasis is on Shuur's voice. "An infectious outing from the talented singer," he summed up.

== Track listing ==
No.	Title	Writer(s)	Length
1.	"I'm Not Ashamed to Sing the Blues"	Robert A. Johnson; Sam Ray Mosley	6:26
2.	"When Did You Leave Heaven?"	Charles Brown; Stan Lewis	4:16
3.	"Stormy Monday Blues"	Earl Hines; Billy Eckstine; Bob Crowder	3:04
4.	"These Blues"	Brown; Jimmie Dale Gilmore	4:41
5.	"Moonlight & Shadows"	Brown	4:23
6.	"All Right, OK, You Win (I'm in Love with You)"	Mayme Watts; Sidney Wyche	3:07
7.	"Who Will the Next Fool Be?"	Charlie Rich	2:29
8.	"Save Your Love for Me"	Buddy Johnson	5:04
9.	"Someone to Love"	Brown	6:05
10.	"Toodle Loo on Down"	Rodney Sturgis; Clarence Williams	2:42
11.	"You've Got to Hurt Before You Heal"	Larry Addison	4:57
12.	"I Want to Go Home"	Brown	3:18
Total length:			50:32

== Charts ==
=== Weekly charts ===
Weekly chart performance for Blues for Schuur
Chart (1997)	Peak position
US Top Jazz Albums (Billboard)	5

=== Year-end charts ===
Year-end chart performance for Blues for Schuur
Chart (1997)	Peak position
US Top Jazz Albums (Billboard)	25
