= Swingin' for Schuur =

Studio album by Diane Schuur
- Released: September 25, 2001
- Recorded: June 6–8, 2001
- Genre: Jazz
- Length: 48:28
- Label: Concord Records
- Producer: Phil Ramone, William Skip Rose

Diane Schuur chronology
Friends for Schuur (2000)	Swingin' for Schuur (2001)	Midnight (2003)

Maynard Ferguson chronology
Big City Rhythms (1999)	Swingin' for Schuur (2001)	The One and Only (2007)

Professional ratings
Review scores
Source	Rating
Allmusic	4/5 stars

Swingin' for Schuur is a 2001 album by American jazz musicians Diane Schuur and Maynard Ferguson, accompanied by his Big Bop Nouveau big band.

Swingin’ For Schuur was on the charts for 9 weeks and peaked at 23 before falling to 50 on the last week.

== Track listing ==
1. "Just One of Those Things" (Cole Porter) – 4:09
2. "Bésame Mucho" (Sunny Skylar, Consuelo Velázquez) – 5:20
3. "Deep Purple" (Peter De Rose, Mitchell Parish) – 6:28
4. "Autumn Leaves" (Joseph Kosma, Johnny Mercer, Jacques Prévert) – 3:33
5. "My Romance" (Lorenz Hart, Richard Rodgers) – 3:52
6. "Love Letters" (Edward Heyman, Victor Young) – 4:39
7. "East of the Sun (and West of the Moon)" (Brooks Bowman) – 3:35
8. "Midnight Sun" (Sonny Burke, Lionel Hampton, Johnny Mercer) – 5:58
9. "I Fall in Love Too Easily" (Sammy Cahn, Jule Styne) – 4:31
10. "Lush Life" (Billy Strayhorn) – 5:58
11. "Just Friends" (John Klenner, Sam M. Lewis) – 4:59
12. "Let's Fall in Love" (Harold Arlen, Ted Koehler) – 3:45

== Personnel ==
=== Performance ===
- Diane Schuur - vocals, piano
- Maynard Ferguson - trumpet
- Paul Armstrong - arranger, trumpet
- Denis DiBlasio - arranger, baritone saxophone
- Pete Ferguson - trumpet
- Patrick Hession - trumpet
- Jeff Lashway - piano
- Jeff Rupert - tenor saxophone
- Mike Dubaniewicz - alto saxophone
- Brian Stahurski - double bass
- Brian Wolfe - drums
- Tom Garling - arranger
- Chip McNeill
- Reggie Watkins trombone, arranger, musical director

=== Production ===
- Glen Barros - executive producer
- John Burk
- Phil Ramone - producer
- William Skip Rose
- Bob Barry - photography
- Dominic Camardella - engineer
- Don Hahn
- Charles Paakkari
- Mark Wilder
- Joseph d'Ambrosio - production coordination
