= Talkin' 'Bout You (album) =

Studio album by Diane Schuur
- Released: 1988
- Genre: Vocal jazz; pop; adult contemporary
- Length: 41:41
- Label: GRP Records
- Producer: Steven Miller

Diane Schuur chronology
Diane Schuur & the Count Basie Orchestra (1987)	Talkin' 'Bout You (1988)	Collection (1989)

Singles from Talkin' 'Bout You
- 1. "Talkin' 'Bout You" Released: 1988 (Netherlands); 2. "Funny (But I Still Love You)" Released: 1989 (Japan)

Talkin' 'Bout You is the fifth studio album by American singer and pianist Diane Schuur, released in 1988 on the GRP Records label. Steven Miller became the producer and arranger. The album was the second chart topper for Schuur on the Billboard jazz chart.

== Critical reception ==
Professional ratings
Review scores
Source	Rating
AllMusic	3/5 stars
The Encyclopedia of Popular Music	3/5 stars
MusicHound Jazz: The Essential Album Guide	3.5/5 stars

A reviewer for Billboard magazine noted that Schuur seems to have decided to try herself in the adult contemporary and pop genres with this "delicious" album. He stressed that the album is dominated by lighter compositions than those that Schuur had recorded before, but her powerful voice, the excellent work of Steven Miller and guest musicians ensure that the crossover will not scare away her devoted jazz fans. Alanna Nash from Stereo Review stated that the pure splendor of Schuur's voice, captured in this ultra-pure production, makes the album one of the most attractive albums of the year (in the genre of pop, jazz or somewhere in between).

== Track listing ==
No.	Title	Writer(s)	Length
1.	"Talkin' 'Bout You"	Ray Charles	4:52
2.	"Funny (But I Still Love You)"	Charles	3:52
3.	"Louisiana Sunday Afternoon"	Franne Golde; Peter Ivers	4:49
4.	"For Your Love"	Ed Townsend	3:42
5.	"Hearts Take Time"	Janis Ian; Kye Fleming	3:44
6.	"Somethin' Real"	Gene McDaniels	4:55
7.	"Hard Drivin' Mama II"	Helen Humes; Steven Miller	4:05
8.	"Nothing in the World (Can Make Me Love You More Than I Do)"	Belford Hendricks; Brook Benton; Clyde Otis	3:38
9.	"Ain't That Love"	Charles	3:19
10.	"Life Goes On"	Dave Schuur; Diane Schuur	3:11
11.	"Cry Me a River"	Arthur Hamilton	4:45
Total length:			41:41

== Personnel ==
- Diane Schuur - lead vocals
- Mitchel Forman - piano (3, 5, 7, 8), synthesizer (3, 4, 5), electric piano (8), string arrangements (4)
- Richard Tee - electric piano (3, 4, 6, 7, 11), organ (1, 6), rhythm arrangements (4, 11)
- Dave Grusin - piano (10)
- Steve Khan - guitar (4, 7, 11), electric guitar (1, 5), acoustic guitar (5)
- Will Lee - bass guitar (1–9, 11)
- Steve Gadd - drums (1–9, 11), tambourine (1, 9)
- Ronnie Cuber - baritone saxophone (1)
- Tom Scott - alto saxophone (3), tenor saxophone (4, 6)
- Lenny Pickett - tenor saxophone (9)
- Jeremy Lubbock - string arrangements (2, 4, 8)
- Edwin Hawkins - vocal arrangements (1, 9)
- Edwin Hawkins Singers - vocals (1, 9)
- Steven Miller - vocal arrangements (1, 9), string arrangements (4, 11), rhythm arrangements (4)

== Charts ==
=== Weekly charts ===
Weekly chart performance for Talkin' 'Bout You
Chart (1988–1989)	Peak position
US Top Jazz Albums (Billboard)	1
US Top Pop Albums (Billboard)	170
US Top 40 Jazz Albums (Cash Box)	4
US Top Traditional Jazz Albums (Cash Box)	1

=== Year-end charts ===
1988 year-end chart performance for Talkin' 'Bout You
Chart (1988)	Peak position
US Top Jazz Albums (Billboard)	25

1989 year-end chart performance for Talkin' 'Bout You
Chart (1989)	Peak position
US Top Jazz Albums (Billboard)	3
US Top Traditional Jazz Albums (Cash Box)	11
