= Diane Schuur & the Count Basie Orchestra =

Live album by Diane Schuur
- Released: 1987
- Recorded: February 25, 1987
- Genre: Vocal jazz
- Length: 40:30
- Label: GRP
- Producer: Morgan Ames, Jeffrey Weber

Diane Schuur chronology
Timeless (1986)	Diane Schuur & the Count Basie Orchestra (1987)	Talkin' 'Bout You (1988)

Professional ratings
Review scores
Source	Rating
Allmusic	4.5/5 stars

Diane Schuur & the Count Basie Orchestra is a 1987 live album by Diane Schuur, accompanied by the Count Basie Orchestra, arranged by Frank Foster.

Three years after Count Basie's death, the Count Basie Orchestra is featured here as a ghost band, led by Frank Foster. This was also the last performance of Freddie Green, who died a week later.

At the Grammy Awards of 1988, for her performance on Diane Schuur & the Count Basie Orchestra, Schuur won her second consecutive Grammy Award for Best Jazz Vocal Performance, Female.

== Track listing ==
1. "Deedles' Blues" (Morgan Ames) – 3:30
2. "Caught a Touch of Your Love" (James Best (A.K.A. James Bugno), Craig Bickhardt, Jack Keller) – 3:13
3. "Trav'lin' Light" (Johnny Mercer, Jimmy Mundy, Trummy Young) – 4:24
4. "I Just Found Out About Love" (Harold Adamson, Jimmy McHugh) – 2:45
5. "Travelin' Blues" (Dave Brubeck, Iola Brubeck) – 4:04
6. "I Loves You Porgy" (George Gershwin, Ira Gershwin, DuBose Heyward) – 3:09
7. "You Can Have It" (Ames, Frank Foster) – 3:25
8. "Only You" (Ames, Bob Florence) – 4:44
9. "Everyday" (Peter Chatman) – 3:09
10. "We'll Be Together Again" (Carl T. Fischer, Frankie Laine) – 4:06
11. "Until I Met You" (Freddie Green, Don Wolf) – 2:53
12. "Climbing Higher Mountains" (Aretha Franklin) – 2:34

== Personnel ==
=== Performance ===
- Diane Schuur - vocals, piano
- Count Basie Orchestra:
- Frank Foster - arranger, tenor saxophone
- Lynn Seaton - double bass
- Dennis Mackrel - drums
- Freddie Green - guitar
- Danny Turner - alto saxophone
- Danny House
- John Williams - baritone saxophone
- Eric Dixon - tenor saxophone
- Kenny Hing
- Clarence Banks - trombone
- Bill Hughes - bass trombone
- Mel Wanzo - lead trombone
- Dennis Wilson - trombone
- Sonny Cohn - trumpet
- Melton Mustafa - trumpet
- Bob Ojeda - trumpet
- Byron Stripling - lead trumpet

=== Production ===
- Dave Grusin - executive producer
- Larry Rosen - executive producer
- Morgan Ames - producer
- Jeffrey Weber - producer
- Robert DeLaGarza - assistant engineer
- Bill-Dog Dooley
- Mark McKenna
- Mike Morongell
- Claudio Ordenes
- Andy Baltimore - design, creative director
- David Gibb - design
- Dave Kunze
- Ivan Salgado
- Dan Serrano
- Bruce Botnick - digital editing, editing
- Allen Sides - engineer
- Takao Ogawa - liner notes
- John S. Wilson
- Aaron A. Woodward - management
- Wally Traugott - mastering
- Judy Clapp - mixing, mixing assistant
- Don Murray - mixing
- Glenn Wexler photography, cover photo
- Mike Johnson - photography
- Janet Van Ham
