= Heart to Heart (Diane Schuur and B. B. King album) =

Studio album by Diane Schuur and B.B. King
- Released: 1994
- Label: GRP
- Producer: Phil Ramone

Diane Schuur chronology
Love Songs (1993)	Heart to Heart (1994)	Love Walked In (1996)

B.B. King chronology
Blues Summit (1993)	Heart to Heart (1994)	Lucille & Friends (1995)

Heart to Heart is an album by Diane Schuur and B.B. King.

== Track listing ==
1. "No One Ever Tells You" (Carroll Coates, Hub Atwood) 4:58
2. "I Can't Stop Loving You" (Don Gibson) 4:30
3. "You Don't Know Me" (Cindy Walker, Eddy Arnold) 3:56
4. "It Had To Be You" (Gus Kahn, Isham Jones) 3:18
5. "I'm Putting All My Eggs In One Basket" (Irving Berlin) 3:35
6. "Glory of Love" (Billy Hill) 3:51
7. "Try A Little Tenderness" (Harry M. Woods, Jimmy Campbell, Reginald Connelly) 4:30
8. "Spirit in the Dark" (Aretha Franklin) 5:03
9. "Freedom" (Lotti Golden, Tommy Faragher) 4:45
10. "At Last" (Harry Warren, Mack Gordon) 5:15
11. "They Can't Take That Away From Me" (George Gershwin, Ira Gershwin) 2:51

== Personnel ==
- B.B. King – vocals, guitar
- Diane Schuur – vocals, piano on tracks 1 & 4
- Chuck Berghofer – bass guitar
- Vinnie Colaiuta – drums
- Randy Waldman – piano
- Paul Viapiano – guitar
