= In Tribute =

Studio album by Diane Schuur
- Released: 1992
- Genre: Vocal jazz
- Length: 56:35
- Label: GRP
- Producer: Andre Fischer

Diane Schuur chronology
Pure Schuur (1991)	In Tribute (1992)	Love Songs (1993)

In Tribute is the seventh studio album by American singer and pianist Diane Schuur, released in 1992 on the GRP Records label. For the album, the singer recorded thirteen standards, each of which is dedicated to one of the jazz singers: Billie Holiday (two songs in her honor), Helen Morgan, Anita O'Day, Sarah Vaughan, Carmen McRae, Ella Fitzgerald, Libby Holman, Peggy Lee, Dinah Washington, Ivie Anderson, Nancy Wilson and Mabel Mercer.

== Critical reception ==
Professional ratings
Review scores
Source	Rating
AllMusic	3/5 stars
The Encyclopedia of Popular Music	3/5 stars
MusicHound Jazz: The Essential Album Guide	3.5/5 stars
The Rolling Stone Jazz & Blues Album Guide	4/5 stars

Scott Yanow of AllMusic noted that in most cases, orchestra arrangements make the music a little heavier, and none of Schuur's performances reach the heights of her role models, but nevertheless, Diane Schuur's voice is quite attractive, and in itself this sincere disc is generally pleasant. The Cash Box reviewer stated that Schuur has long been a respected vocalist in the music industry, but in this project she and executive producer Dave Grusin really outdid themselves.

== Track listing ==
No.	Title	Writer(s)	Length
1.	"Them There Eyes"	Doris Tauber; Maceo Pinkard; William Tracy	3:46
2.	"The Man I Love"	Ira Gershwin; George Gershwin	4:43
3.	"God Bless the Child"	Billie Holiday; Arthur Herzog Jr.	4:13
4.	"Sweet Georgia Brown"	Ben Bernie; Kenneth Casey; Pinkard	3:01
5.	"Guess I'll Hang My Tears Out to Dry"	Sammy Cahn; Jules Styne	4:59
6.	"'Round Midnight"	Bernie Hanighen; Cootie Williams; Thelonious Monk	6:35
7.	"How High the Moon"	Nancy Hamilton; Morgan Lewis	3:05
8.	"Body and Soul"	Edward Heyman; Frank Eyton; Robert Sour; John Green	5:01
9.	"Black Coffee"	Paul Francis Webster; Francis J. Burke	3:15
10.	"Love for Sale"	Cole Porter	3:24
11.	"Sophisticated Lady"	Irving Mills; Mitchell Parish; Duke Ellington	3:46
12.	"The Best Is Yet to Come"	Carolyn Leigh; Cy Coleman	3:41
13.	"Ev'ry Time We Say Goodbye"	Porter	7:06
Total length:			56:35

== Charts ==
=== Weekly charts ===
Weekly chart performance for In Tribute
Chart (1992)	Peak position
US Top Jazz Albums (Billboard)	2

=== Year-end charts ===
Year-end chart performance for In Tribute
Chart (1992)	Peak position
US Top Jazz Albums (Billboard)	6
