= Diane Schuur =

American jazz musician (born 1953)

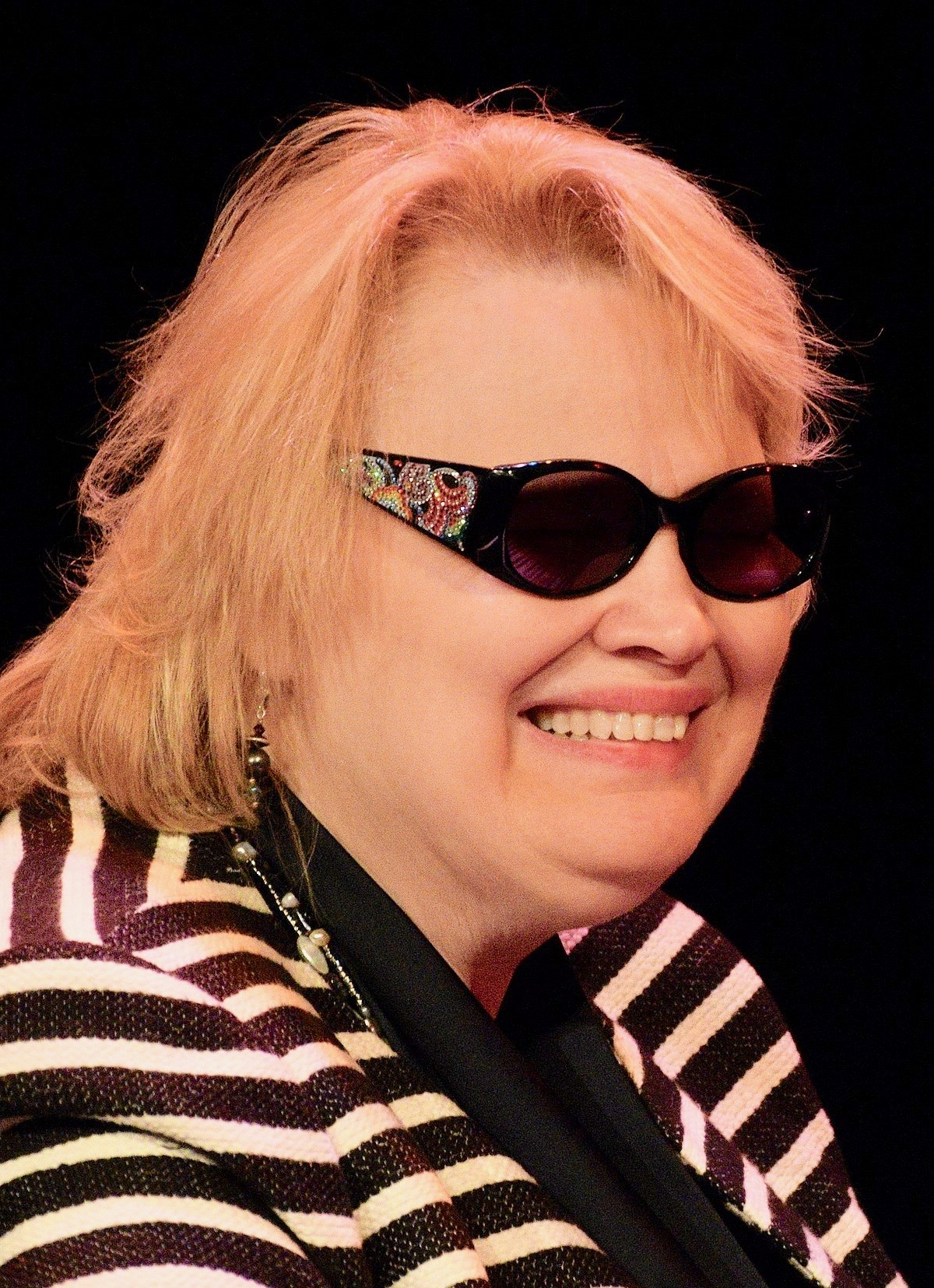
- Schuur at Cabot Performing Arts Center, Beverly, Massachusetts in 2015

Background information
- Also known as: Deedles
- Born: Diane Joan Schuur; December 10, 1953 (age 72); Tacoma, Washington, U.S.
- Genre: Jazz
- Occupation: Musician
- Instruments: Vocals, piano
- Years active: 1979–present
- Labels: GRP, Concord
- Website: dianeschuur.com

Diane Joan Schuur (born December 10, 1953), nicknamed "Deedles", is an American jazz singer and pianist. As of 2015, Schuur had released 23 albums, and had extended her jazz repertoire to include essences of Latin, gospel, pop and country music. Her most successful album is Diane Schuur & the Count Basie Orchestra, which remained number one on the Billboard Jazz Charts for 33 weeks. She won Grammy Awards for best female jazz vocal performance in both 1986 and 1987 and has had three other Grammy nominations.

Schuur has performed in venues such as Carnegie Hall, The Kennedy Center, and the White House, and has performed with many artists including Ray Charles, Frank Sinatra, Quincy Jones, and Stevie Wonder. Co-performers on Schuur's albums have included Barry Manilow, José Feliciano, Maynard Ferguson, Stan Getz, Vince Gill, Alison Krauss, and B.B. King. Her album with B.B. King was number one on the Billboard Jazz Charts. She was Johnny Carson's guest on NBC's The Tonight Show eleven times.

Schuur has been blind from birth due to retinopathy of prematurity. She has absolute pitch and a clear vocal tone. In 1996, she was a guest performer on Sesame Street, where she was interviewed by Elmo and described to him how a blind person can learn to use other senses to adapt in the world. In 2000 she was awarded the Helen Keller Achievement Award by the American Foundation for the Blind.

== Early life ==
Schuur was born on December 10, 1953, in Tacoma, Washington, two months premature and weighing less than three pounds. Complications of prematurity resulted in her total loss of vision. Her twin brother, David, had normal vision at birth but some hearing loss. She also has a younger sister. Schuur grew up in Auburn, Washington, a southern suburb of Seattle. She attended the Washington School for the Blind in Vancouver from age four to eleven. She lived at school but was able to commute home 150 miles on the train by herself. She later transferred to public school where teachers' aides helped her keep up in class.

== Musical beginnings ==
Schuur started singing when she was about four years old. Her mother, who died when Schuur was 13, loved jazz and had a Duke Ellington record collection. Her father, a police captain, was an amateur musician who often played piano with his daughter sitting by his side. Schuur stated, "As far back as I can remember, singing was in my blood. My parents loved music, and I loved to sing. I was scatting at an early age". She has absolute pitch. Schuur listened to the radio avidly in her youth; her early musical idols were Sarah Vaughan and Dinah Washington. She said that as a small child she would often retreat to a closet to sing.

Schuur first learned to play the piano by ear. Though she later learned to read braille-written music, she found its use frustrating and impractical since it took away use of one of her hands while playing the piano; however, she frequently used braille-transcribed lyrics in performances and during recording sessions. One of her first public performances was at age ten, singing country music at Tacoma's Holiday Inn; a booking arranged by her aunt. Even when she was a student at the Washington School for the Blind, she would come home on weekends, perform on Friday and Saturday nights and take a train back to school for Monday classes.

At age 15 she was taken by her father to Lake Tahoe to audition as a lounge singer at Harrah's hotel and casino. She got the job, but her widowed father found it impossible to leave his job at the police force to chaperone her, and the offer had to be declined. Schuur was noticed by country music singer/actor Jimmy Wakely, who met her in an Elks Club in 1971 when she was eighteen. After auditioning for him, Wakely arranged a recording session in California. Accompanied by her sister, Schuur took her first airplane trip to the session in Burbank, and made a 45 rpm record of a song called "Dear Mommy and Daddy". Schuur performed locally a great deal in her late teens, and had started to develop a distinctive musical voice. Entertainment writer Stewart Weiner called it a "crystal-clear vocal tone hitting every note in the center of the bull's eye."

== Discovery ==
In 1975, at age 22, Schuur auditioned for drummer/bandleader Ed Shaughnessy. Escorted by her twin brother, she went backstage to seek out Shaughnessy after he had finished a concert in Seattle with bandleader Doc Severinsen. Shaughnessy said, "Doc's concert was over and this young blind girl comes in and sits down at the Fender Rhodes keyboard and starts singing the blues. Well, my hair stood on end!" He hired her to be the vocalist in his orchestra, "Energy Force". Jazz trumpeter Dizzy Gillespie heard her and, in 1979, invited her to sit in on a set at the Monterey Jazz Festival. According to Dave Gelly in his 2002 book, Stan Getz: Nobody Else But Me, Schuur's performance created "a minor sensation".

Despite this success, the Shaughnessy connection was not the breakthrough she had hoped for. Schuur failed to impress bandleader Doc Severinsen, who turned her down when she auditioned for a guest spot on Johnny Carson's Tonight Show. Some people in the industry dubbed her "Lady Overkill" because she had a tendency to oversing or tried to put everything she knew into a brief space. For the next three years, Schuur performed in clubs and sharpened her skills. Jazz saxophonist Stan Getz, who had been impressed when he heard her sing "Amazing Grace" at Monterey in 1979, did not give up on her. He became her advisor and coach. Discussing Getz in this role, Schuur stated, "he really was a mentor of mine. He taught me that less is more."

Schuur recorded her first album, Pilot of my Destiny, in 1981 in Seattle on the independent label, Great American Records. It included some of her original compositions and Getz performed on it. Entertainment writer Michael Hoffman, writing in the Arizona Daily Star, said the album suffered from "poor production and distribution" and did not do very well. The album has become a collector's item since the original masters were lost. It was re-released on the MIM Label in 1982, on vinyl only.

== Breakthrough ==
In the early 1980s, Stan Getz remained a behind-the-scenes mover who arranged a second appearance for Schuur at the Monterey Jazz Festival. In 1982, he invited her to perform with him in a music showcase at the White House during the Reagan administration. The performance was part of a series designed to encourage established jazz musicians to introduce young artists whom they believe have exceptional potential. Schuur, then 29 years old, was the only vocalist on the bill, appearing and performing with eminent instrumentalists Itzhak Perlman, Dizzy Gillespie, Chick Corea, and Stan Getz. After the performance, Nancy Reagan rushed to embrace Schuur. Mrs. Reagan had invited George H. W. Bush and Barbara Bush to attend this performance. President Reagan was not there but wrote Schuur a personal letter afterwards.

The White House performance was televised, giving Schuur a much broader audience. Producer Larry Rosen happened to see the broadcast and was impressed by her performance. Rosen and his business partner, musician Dave Grusin, set out to find Schuur by contacting Stan Getz. This led to a recording contract with GRP Records. Nancy Reagan invited Schuur to perform at the White House a second time, for a "Ladies of the Senate" luncheon in 1987, where she performed as a vocalist with the Count Basie Orchestra. She returned to the White House a third time to perform for President Clinton in 1995.

== Career ==
When she signed with the GRP label, digital technology was becoming available and she had veteran producer Dave Grusin supervising her first three albums; the recordings also benefited from the cachet brought by Stan Getz performing on them. Her first album under this label, Deedles, met with moderate but significant success, reaching number 35 on the Billboard jazz charts. It was her first record to be released internationally. Following this, Schuur Thing was released in 1985, featuring guest artist José Feliciano, and reached number 10 on the Billboard jazz charts . In that same year, a big break came for Schuur when she was invited to perform on the 28th Annual Grammy Awards Show, broadcast on the CBS Network. Timeless was her fourth album, for which she received her first Grammy Award, winning best female jazz vocal performance for 1986. Four noted arrangers contributed in writing the charts for this recording – Billy May, Johnny Mandel, Jeremy Lubbock and Patrick Williams. The following year she won her second Grammy for best jazz vocal, this time for Diane Schuur & the Count Basie Orchestra. The album was one of her most successful, remaining at the top of Billboard's Traditional Jazz Charts for 33 weeks. The Basie Band on the album was led by Frank Foster. Foster himself won a Grammy for his work on this same recording – best arrangement accompanying a vocal, Jazz category, 1987. The session included Freddie Green, Basie's long time guitarist. Then 76 years old, Green's guitar work on the recording was the final performance of his career. In 1985, while on tour in the Far East, Schuur met B.B. King when they both played at a music festival in Tokyo. Schuur and King hit it off musically, and later made an album together called Heart to Heart. Released in May 1994, Heart to Heart entered the Billboard Jazz Charts at number one.

In 1988, she received a phone call from Frank Sinatra asking her to sing with him in a benefit concert in Palm Springs, filling in for Liza Minnelli, who was unable to perform. Schuur was a guest at the Sinatras' home, then performed in a concert with him conducted by Quincy Jones. Sinatra gave her an abstract oil painting he had created. Years later, after his death, Schuur made an album called I Remember You: Love to Stan and Frank, an homage to her then late friends Sinatra and Stan Getz. Schuur continued making albums through the 1990s and into the 2000s, sometimes experimenting with essences of other genres. Schuur Fire (2005) featured Caribbean Jazz Project musicians, with Brazilian guitarist Oscar Castro-Neves. Talkin' 'Bout You – an album titled after the Ray Charles song of the same name, was in the pop category. Jazz purists were not happy with her crossing lines into other genres, saying she was on the periphery of jazz; nevertheless, her pop music still received Grammy nominations – just in a different category.

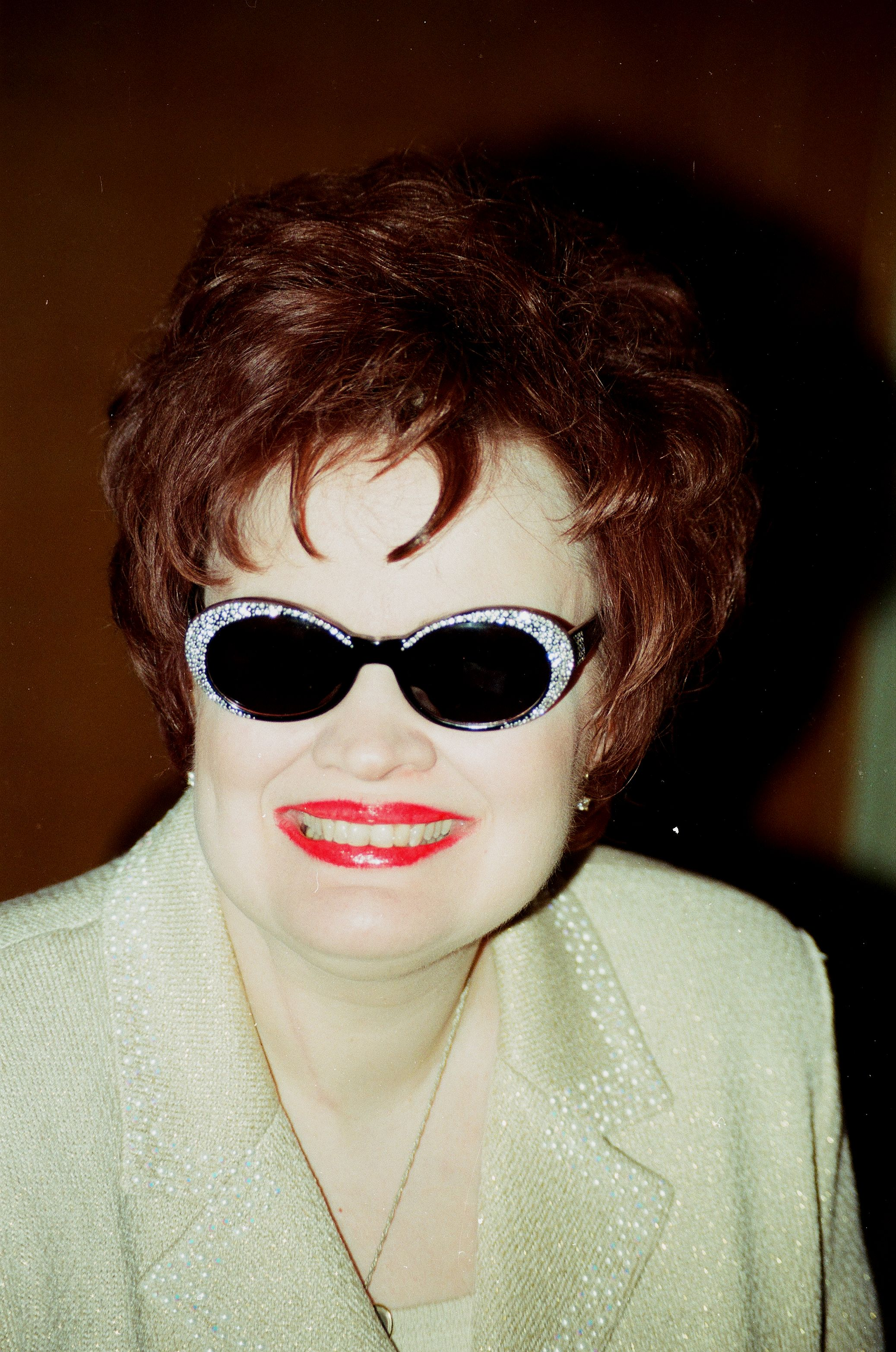
Schuur at Larry King's charity event in 1998

In 1996, Schuur appeared as a guest performer on Sesame Street. In an interview by Elmo, she answered questions about how a blind person can learn to use other senses to get along in the world. In 1998, she was a special guest on "Ray Charles in Concert", a benefit for the Miami Lighthouse for the Blind. She performed at Carnegie Hall in a tribute to Irving Berlin in 1988, and again in 1996 in a tribute to Ella Fitzgerald. Schuur gave a performance in 1999 to honor Stevie Wonder at The Kennedy Center Honors. She sang "I Just Called to Say I Love You" arranged and accompanied by Herbie Hancock. Entertainment writer Jake Elyachar rated this as one of the top 20 best performances ever given on the Kennedy Center Honors series. Wonder was visibly emotionally moved by the performance. She was awarded the Helen Keller Achievement Award by the American Foundation for the Blind in 2000. Late in 2003, Schuur released Midnight, featuring original songs written by Barry Manilow for the album. Manilow's long-time songwriting team, which included co-producer Eddie Arkin, and lyricists Marty Panzer, Bruce Susan, and Adrienne Anderson, contributed to the project. Manilow produced the album and also performed on it. The guest artists were Brian McKnight and Karrin Allyson and it was backed by Tony-winner Bill Elliott and the Bill Elliott Swing Orchestra. Her second live album, Diane Schuur: Live In London, was recorded at Ronnie Scott's, a historic jazz club in London's Soho district. Scott's is the site of previous live albums by Ella Fitzgerald and Nina Simone.

Schuur came to Nashville in 2011 for her first country album, The Gathering, produced by Steve Buckingham. She said that the album was prompted by thoughts of her father, who loved country music, and also by the success of Ray Charles in the country genre. Alison Krauss, Vince Gill, and Mark Knopfler were guest artists. Allmusic reviewer Thom Jurek said about The Gathering that while Schuur maintained her signature singing style, "she was also interested in omitting the twang".

Schuur was Johnny Carson's guest on NBC's The Tonight Show eleven times. As of 2015, Schuur had made 23 albums. She maintains an active tour schedule, and, as of 2016 and 2017, has booked dates to perform in Rio de Janeiro, São Paulo, Rome, Palermo, Guanajuato, and multiple cities across the United States.

In February 2024, Schuur on her official site announced the cancellation of an upcoming tour and her decision to step back from performing. She revealed the reason as Ménière’s disease, which was impacting her ability to perform.

== Personal life ==
Schuur received a financial settlement from her birth hospital for her loss of vision. Prematurity itself is associated with blindness, but it was not universally known at the time of her birth that high levels of oxygen in a neonatal incubator can have a negative effect on the developing retinas of the eyes, thereby increasing the incidence of blindness. The settlement money helped her to buy a house in later years. Schuur was called "Deedle-Babes", "Deeds" and other variations of this name by her mother, who died of cancer at age 31. "Deedles" is the nickname that stuck and became the title of one of her early albums.

In 1996, at age 43, Schuur married Les Crockett, a retired space engineer whom she affectionately called "Rocket". Years later he developed Parkinson's disease, prostate cancer, and other health issues; they eventually divorced, "but not for the usual reasons", says writer Jeff Spevak. Crockett had developed dementia and hallucinations requiring institutional care; with her blindness, she simply could not take care of him.

Schuur is a voracious reader and a cat owner. She is an ardent fan of the American daytime television series The Young and the Restless, to the extent of personally visiting the set on at least three occasions. Her Grammy awards, one inscribed in braille, sit on a Baldwin piano given to her by the manufacturer. In 2011, Schuur experienced skydiving in Hawaii, attached in tandem to an instructor, and said, "I don't know if I'd ever do that again."

In a 2011 interview on PBS in Houston with Ernie Manouse, Schuur stated that she had chronically struggled with her weight. She had a drug and alcohol addiction in the late 1980s, and had attempted suicide in the past. At one point, she was stopped from jumping from a third-story window by her brother-in-law. She benefited from twelve-step programs and, as of 2016, had been sober for several decades. Schuur has dedicated songs to the founder of Alcoholics Anonymous in her shows. She stated that her life has grown much more spiritual as she has matured.

In early 2022, Schurr had planned a 10 city tour including a stop in her birthplace of Tacoma, Washington. However, before the tour began, she was forced to cancel the dates and announced via her website that she was dealing with Ménière’s Disease which is a disease of the inner ear. Although she did not explicity say she was retiring, she commented, "I never want to disappoint an audience and so I have reached the only conclusion that makes sense to me, a sad one, nonetheless."

On July 24, 2026, Glitter & Grits Records released a duet of "The Lady is a Tramp featuring Deborah Silver and Diane Schuur. Schuur posted on her Facebook page that the performance had been recorded about four years earlier.

== Discography ==
Studio albums

- Pilot of My Destiny (1982)
- Deedles (1984)
- Schuur Thing (1985)
- Timeless (1986)
- Talkin' 'Bout You (1988)
- Pure Schuur (1991)
- In Tribute (1992)
- Love Songs (1993)
- Heart to Heart (1994)
- Love Walked In (1996)
- Blues for Schuur (1997)
- Music Is My Life (1999)
- Friends for Schuur (2000)
- Swingin' for Schuur (2001)
- Midnight (2003)
- Schuur Fire (2005)
- Some Other Time (2008)
- The Gathering (2011)
- I Remember You: Love to Stan and Frank (2014)
- Running on Faith (2020)

== Awards and nominations ==
Diane Schuur Grammy Awards History
Year	Category	Title	Genre	Label	Result
1986	Best Jazz Vocal Performance – Female	Timeless	Jazz	GRP	Won
1987	Best Jazz Vocal Performance – Female	Diane Schuur and the Count Basie Orchestra	Jazz	GRP	Won
1989	Best Jazz Vocal Performance – Female	The Christmas Song	Jazz	GRP	Nominated
1991	Traditional Pop Performance	Pure Schuur	Pop	GRP	Nominated
1993	Traditional Pop Performance	Love Songs	Pop	GRP	Nominated
