= Andrea Lewis =

Canadian actress (born 1985)

- Born: Andrea Desiree Lewis; August 15, 1985 (age 41); Pickering, Ontario, Canada
- Occupations: Actress, singer
- Years active: 1998–present
- Spouse: Felix Howard (m. 2021)
- Website: missandrealewis.com

Andrea Desiree Lewis (born August 15, 1985) is a Canadian actress and singer, known for her role as Hazel Aden in the long-running TV series Degrassi: The Next Generation.

== Early life ==
One of two children, Lewis is the daughter of Caribbean-born parents. Her mother is from Jamaica and her father is from St. Vincent.

== Career ==
Lewis made her feature flim debut in 1998 as Cassandra in Maya Angelou's directorial debut Down in the Delta. The following year, she acted with Naomi Judd in the television Christmas special A Holiday Romance.

In 2001, Lewis appeared with Diahann Carroll in the biopic The Natalie Cole Story. The same year, she played Brigette in an episode of Soul Food: The Series on Showtime, returning in 2003 for one episode, playing Dana. She also began her role as Hazel Aden in Degrassi: The Next Generation. She would stay as a regular on the show until her character's graduation in 2006. In 2003 and again in 2006, she was nominated in the category of Best Young Ensemble Performance in a TV Series (Comedy or Drama) for her role in Degrassi: The Next Generation at the Young Artist Awards.

In 2002, Lewis played Hilary Duff's best friend, Carla Hall, in the Disney Channel Original Movie Cadet Kelly.

Lewis released her debut album Float Away, on September 20, 2005. The album was released in Canada only.

She appeared in the Nickelodeon's musical film Spectacular!, playing Robin, a member in a high school choir. Lewis appeared alongside Nolan Gerard Funk, Tammin Sursok, Victoria Justice and Simon Curtis. The film's premiere broadcast was on February 16, 2009.

Her second album, 5-4-3-2-1, was released on October 10, 2010 for free on her blog.

In 2011, Lewis played a minor role in the musical Hairspray which travelled around Canada.

She founded the entertainment company Jungle Wild Productions in 2012 with Brian Walker. The company's mission is to produce diverse and original television, film, and digital content showcasing women, people of colour, and people in LGBT communities.

In 2013, Lewis created her own YouTube channel where she could showcase her own work. Much of the work featured on the channel "focuses on the theme of self-love and finding inner strength." That year she created and starred in her own web series called Black Actress, which can be seen on Issa Rae's YouTube channel. Black Actress includes candid confessionals by actresses such as Amber Riley, Garcell Beauvais, Jenifer Lewis, and Naturi Naughton, who share their experiences in the acting profession.

In 2016, she created and starred in the web series Beyond Complicated, which can be found on Lewis' YouTube Channel.

Lewis reunited with the Degrassi cast in 2018 for former co-star and on-screen romance Drake's music video for his single "I'm Upset."

She released her short documentary, Black Men, on her YouTube channel in 2019. The short included interviews of Black men and boys, including stars Shamier Anderson, Allen Maldonado, and Sinorice Moss, investigating how "hyper-masculinity, societal oppression, and stereotypes influence how Black men relate to each other and to themselves."

Lewis served as the creator and executive producer of the three-part docuseries The Black Beauty Effect. The series examined "the Black women who serve as catalysts for social change within the beauty industry." It featured beauty influencers and industry insiders such as Whitney White, Mikki Taylor, Cara Sabin, and Amber Riley. Jackie Aina, Kahlana Barfield Brown, and C.J. Faison served as executive producers as well. The series premiered in 2022.

In 2022, she starred in the Hulu and Andscape produced movie Three Ways. In 2023, Lewis starred in the Hallmark mystery film A Nashville Legacy as Naima.

== Personal life ==
Lewis and her best friend, Shannon T. Boodram, started their own blog, Those Girls Are Wild, which includes comedic skits performed by the two.

On October 28, 2021, via Instagram, Lewis announced her marriage to music executive and producer Felix Howard. They live between London and California.

== Discography ==
=== Albums ===
Year	Album
September 20, 2005	Float Away
October 10, 2010	54321

=== Singles ===
Year	Title	Album
2005	"Superwomen"	Float Away
2005	"I'm Like (Ooh Oh)"	Float Away
2006	"Out of My Mind"	Float Away
2008	"Do What I Want"	
2010	"Voodoo"	54321
2013	"I Can't Leave U Alone"	Airborne

== Filmography ==
=== Film ===
Year	Title	Role	Notes
1998	Down in the Delta	Cassandra	
2002	Junk	Girl Scout #1	
2008	Body Shop	Woman in Bar	
2014	Bastards	Bette	Short film
2015	Everyday Miracles	Bar Patron	
2022	Three Ways	Stacy	

=== Television ===
Year	Title	Role	Notes
1995	Harrison Bergeron		Television movie
1999	A Holiday Romance	Autumn	Television movie
2000	Livin' for Love: The Natalie Cole Story	Natalie Cole 14-15	Television movie
2001–2003	Soul Food	Brigette	2 episodes
2001–2006	Degrassi: The Next Generation	Hazel Aden	Season 1-2 recurring, season 3-5 regular, 87 episodes
2002	Cadet Kelly	Cadet Carla Hall	Television movie
2005–2006	Moccasin Flats	Melissa	8 episodes
2009	Spectacular!	Robin	Television movie
2011	Warehouse 13	JoBeth	1 episode
2016	Conversating While Black	Anya	
2016-2017	The Number: The Reboot	Sasha	4 episodes
2022	Revenge of the Black Best Friend	Herself	2 episodes
2023	A Nashville Legacy	Naima	Television movie
2023	Dress for Success		Television movie
2023	Christmas Revisted		Television movie
2024	How to Die Alone		1 episode

=== Music videos ===
Year	Title	Artist
2010	54321	Andrea Lewis
2018	I'm Upset	Drake

=== Web series ===
Year	Title	Artist	Notes
2013	Black Actress	Kori Bailey	Main role; Executive producer; Writer
2016	Beyond Complicated	Kori	4 episodes; Producer; Writer

== On Stage ==
Year	Title	Role	Notes
2012	It Takes a Village to Raise...Hell	Michelle	

== Filmmaking credits ==
Year	Title	Producer	Writer	Notes
2013	Black Actress	Yes	Yes	
2016	Beyond Complicated	Yes	Yes	7 episodes
2018	Token	Yes	Yes	
2022	The Black Beauty Effect	Yes	No	3 episodes
