= Introspection (disambiguation) =

Introspection is the self-observation of one's mental processes.

Introspection may also refer to:

== Music ==
- Introspection (EP), a 2013 EP by Keep of Kalessin
- Introspection (Greg Howe album), 1993
- Introspection (Myriads album), 2002
- Introspection (Thijs van Leer album), or the title song, 1972
- Introspection, a 1969 album by the UK band The End
- Introspection, a 2006 album by Ivo Perelman
- "Introspection", a song by MC Solaar from Mach 6
- "Introspection", a song by MGMT from their 2013 eponymous album

== Other uses ==
- Type introspection, a capability of some object-oriented programming languages
- Virtual machine introspection, a technique for externally monitoring the runtime state of a system-level virtual machine

== See also ==
- Introspection Rundown, a Scientology practice
- Introspective, a 1988 album by Pet Shop Boys
- Introspective (Amber Smith album), 2007
