= 8Bit Heart =

Studio album by Simon Curtis
- Released: March 23, 2010
- Recorded: 2008–2010
- Genre: Electronica, 8-bit, dance-pop, electropop
- Length: 42:12
- Label: Simon Curtis (self-labeled)
- Producer: Jeff "Jadion" Wells

Simon Curtis chronology
Spectacular! (2009)	8Bit Heart (2010)	R∆ (2011)

Singles from 8Bit Heart
- 1. "Delusional" Released: February 5, 2010; 2. "Diablo" Released: May 20, 2010; 3. "8Bit Heart" Released: August 10, 2010; 4. "The Dark" Released: November 20, 2010

8Bit Heart is the debut album by American singer-songwriter and record producer Simon Curtis. It was released March 23, 2010 for free download via Curtis' official website. Curtis co-produced the album with Jeff "Jadion" Wells. The album was downloaded 80 thousand times in its first week of being released.

== Background ==
Curtis announced in 2009 that he would release his debut album, 8Bit Heart, for free on his official website as soon as he reaches eight thousand followers on his Twitter page. Curtis originally intended to release a song after every eight hundred follows but only released "Delusional" on October 29, 2009, and "Diablo" on December 2, 2009. The album was recorded in a "tiny basement in the hills of West Virginia" with Jeff Wells. An album with a similar logo titled '8 Bit Heart' with a track 'Animatronic Boy' was released prior under chip-tune artist Leeni with a registered copyright in 2008 with later reviews in June 2009.

There are several references in four songs on the album. In "Diablo" the beginning line mirrors Kelly Clarkson's "Since U Been Gone" but followed by "but this is not a Kelly Clarkson song and not how it ends". In the same song, a line from "If U Seek Amy" by Britney Spears is copied before Curtis realizes "oh wait, this song isn't mine". In "Beat Drop" a clip from Lady Gaga's "Bad Romance" is used as backing vocals on the last line of the second verse. The operatic singing comes from the second aria of the Der Hölle Rache from the Magic Flute. Extracts from an interview with former KGB agent Yuri Bezmenov in 1985 are used as an intro and outro for "Brainwash". "The Dark Crystal Overture" is also heavily sampled on the track "The Dark".

== Critical response ==
8Bit Heart has received mostly positive reviews. Bradley Stern from MuuMuse gave the album four out of five commenting that it "is a hard-hitting collection of cutting-edge pop hooks, catchy electronic noises and storming, dancefloor-ready synthesized beats that come together to celebrate the very essence of modern pop". He also compared Curtis' vocals to that of Darren Hayes and Justin Timberlake. A journalist from Music Fascination says the album "uses unique production combined with sounds and beats that develop the music into strong cohesive pop" and that it is "filled with pure danceable energy, but enough heart to keep you listening". They also praised Curtis' "distinct sound and production skill". ALi's Blog praised Curtis' independent work, wondering "what he can accomplish with a big label behind him". Paul Reynolds from FizzyPop!! says the album "not only delivers musically, but creates a themed album that is a real delight from start to finish".

== Track list ==
Standard edition
No.	Title	Writer(s)	Length
1.	"BoyRobot"	Simon Curtis	1:20
2.	"Don't Wanna Be Alone"	Simon Curtis	2:25
3.	"Fell in Love w/an Android"	Simon Curtis	2:55
4.	"Super Psycho Love"	Simon Curtis	3:40
5.	"8Bit Heart"	Simon Curtis	2:50
6.	"Diablo"	Simon Curtis	4:30
7.	"The Neverending Elevator"	Simon Curtis	1:00
8.	"Delusional"	Simon Curtis	3:50
9.	"Joystick"	Simon Curtis	3:25
10.	"Beat Drop"	Simon Curtis	2:25
11.	"Brainwash"	Rochella Danishei, Simon Curtis	4:00
12.	"The Dark" (featuring Jay-Z)	Simon Curtis	4:00
13.	"Victory"	Simon Curtis	0:40
