= It's a Beautiful Thing (Tammin song) =

2005 single by Tammin Sursok

Single by Tammin

from the album Whatever Will Be
- Released: 25 July 2005
- Length: 3:16
- Label: Random; Columbia; Sony BMG
- Songwriters: Matthew Gerrard; Bridget Benenate; Steve Booker
- Producer: Matthew Gerrard

Tammin singles chronology
"Whatever Will Be" (2005)	"It's a Beautiful Thing" (2005)	"Say Something" (2014)

"It's a Beautiful Thing" is the third and final single released by Australian actress Tammin from her first album, Whatever Will Be (2005). Andrew and Michael Tierney from Australian pop group Human Nature helped produce the song's vocals. Released on 25 July 2005, "It's a Beautiful Thing" entered the Australian ARIA Singles Chart at number 30 and spent 12 weeks in the top 100. The CD single contains three acoustic versions of album tracks plus the video clip for her second single, "Whatever Will Be."

== Track listing ==
Australian CD single

1. "It's a Beautiful Thing" (Fresh radio mix) – 3:17
2. "Pointless Relationship" (acoustic) – 4:03
3. "Tender" (acoustic) – 3:56
4. "Whatever Will Be" (acoustic) – 3:33
5. "Whatever Will Be" (video) – 3:50

== Credits and personnel ==
Credits are lifted from the Whatever Will Be liner notes.

Studio

- Mastered at Studio 301 (Sydney, Australia)

Personnel

- Matthew Gerrard – writing, production, arrangement
- Bridget Benenate – writing
- Steve Booker – writing
- Andrew Tierney – additional vocal production
- Michael Tierney – additional vocal production
- Mark Endert – mixing
- Don Bartley – mastering

== Charts ==
Chart (2005)	Peak position
Australia (ARIA)	30
