= I Hate Myself =

I Hate Myself may refer to:

- I Hate Myself (band), an American band
- Dear God, I Hate Myself, a 2010 album by American indie rock band Xiu Xiu

== Songs ==
- I Hate Myself (for Loving You), a 1987 album by Van Leer
- "I Hate Myself for Loving You," a 1988 song from Joan Jett and the Blackhearts
- "Me Odio" ("I Hate Myself"), a 2006 song by Gloria Estefan
- "I Hate Myself", a 2024 song by Rachel Chinouriri from her album What a Devastating Turn of Events

== See also ==
- I Hate You (disambiguation)
