= I Hate You =

I Hate You or I Hate U may refer to:

== Film and television ==
- I Hate You (TV series), British television series
- I Hate You (film), 2024 film

== Songs ==
- "I Hate You", a song by 2PM from 2:00PM Time for Change, 2009
- "I Hate You", a song by Earshot from The Silver Lining, 2008
- "I Hate You", a song written by Irving Berlin
- "I Hate You", a song by Ronnie Milsap from Where My Heart Is, 1973
- "I Hate You", a song by The Stranglers from Suite XVI, 2006
- "I Hate You", a song by Urban Zakapa from 02, 2012
- "I Hate You", a song by Verbal Abuse, 1983
- "I Hate You", a song by Woodz, 2022
- "I Hate You", a song featured in the film Star Trek IV: The Voyage Home, 1986
- "Platypus (I Hate You)", a song by Green Day from Nimrod, 1997
- "I Hate U" (Prince song), 1995
- "I Hate U" (SZA song), 2021
- "I Hate U", a song by Simon Curtis from the 2011 album RA

== See also ==
- "I Hate U, I Love U", a 2016 song by Gnash featuring Olivia O'Brien
- Hate You (disambiguation)
- I Hate Myself (disambiguation)
- P.S. I Hate You (disambiguation)
