= Whatever Will Be =

Studio album by Tammin
- Released: 22 May 2005
- Recorded: 2004–2005
- Genres: Power pop; pop rock
- Length: 44:17
- Labels: Columbia; Random; Sony BMG Music Entertainment
- Producers: Kalle Engstrom; Carl Falk; Matthew Gerrard; David Kreuger; Per Mangusson; Jake Schulze

Tammin chronology
Whatever Will Be (2005)	Spectacular! (2009)

Singles from Whatever Will Be
- 1. "Pointless Relationship" Released: 15 November 2004; 2. "Whatever Will Be" Released: 28 March 2005; 3. "It's a Beautiful Thing" Released: 24 July 2005

Whatever Will Be is the debut studio album by Australian singer Tammin Sursok, released on 22 May 2005 by Sony BMG Music Entertainment. It debuted at number thirteen on the top 50 Australian ARIA Charts. It features the singles "Pointless Relationship", "Whatever Will Be" and "It's a Beautiful Thing". The album spent eleven weeks in the top 100.

== Background and production ==
Sursok left Home and Away in 2004, so she could pursue a music career and acting opportunities in the United States. The actress explained "I'm 21 and it's time to be more creative. It is scary, but I had to leave before I became stale." In 2004, Sursok confirmed she was signed a recording contract with Sony BMG Music Entertainment as well as confirming reports that recording had begun for her debut studio album with songwriters Savan Kotecha, David Kreuger, Marion Raven, Steve Booker and producers John Shanks, Per Mangusson and David Kreuger.

In an interview, Tammin said; "My music has two sides to the album, one has a pop/rock edge, and the other has more live instrumentation with a bit of an organic piano-based feel as well. So it's a bit of both! A lot of people ask what my music is like, but I never went into the recording studio saying 'I want to make an album like this person' ... so everyone who's heard the songs ... I think my stuff is unique to me, I know what music I do love to listen to, but for me I don't think it sounds like anything else."

== Singles ==
"Pointless Relationship" was released as the lead single on 14 November 2004, "Pointless Relationship" debuted within the ARIA Singles Chart at number 7 before peaking at number five, spending fifteen weeks on the chart. Upon the song's release it quickly shot to number one on the Australian Top 100 Radio Airplay Chart, becoming the highest charting debut single in years. "Pointless Relationship" certified Platinum in Australia.

"Whatever Will Be was released as the second single off the album on 28 March 2005. Quickly after its release it debuted at number thirteen on the ARIA Singles Chart and spent a total of eighteen weeks on the charts. It ended its year making the ARIA Year End chart at number 98.

"It's a Beautiful Thing" was chosen as the third and last single off the album being released on 24 July 2005. It quickly debuted in the ARIA Singles chart at number thirty, the song peaked at number six, spending twelve weeks on the chart. "It's a Beautiful Thing" became the second most downloaded song in its debut week, behind Rob Thomas's "This Is How a Heart Breaks". The also peaked at number forty-nine within the Australian Top 100 Radio Airplay Chart, becoming her lowest charting single.

== Commercial performance ==
On 30 May 2005, Whatever Will Be made its debut in the ARIA Albums Chart at number thirteen. During its second week on the chart it remained at its peak position of number thirteen. However, during its third week, it had a significant drop by twenty-three spots landing the album at number thirty-six. During its fourth week, it once again fell further landing at number forty-three. It ended its run on June 20, dropping off the chart.

== Track listing ==
Credits adapted from the liner notes of Whatever Will Be.

Whatever Will Be
No.	Title	Writer(s)	Producer(s)	Length
1.	"Pointless Relationship"	Savan Kotecha; Per Magnusson; David Kreuger; Marion Raven	Per Magnusson; David Kreuger	3:26
2.	"World Without You"	John Shanks; Oliver Leiber	Magnusson; Kreuger	3:53
3.	"Whatever Will Be"	Jake Schulze; Kotecha; Carl Falk	Jake Schulze; Kalle Engstrom; Carl Falk	3:47
4.	"It's a Little Late"	Magnusson; Kreuger; Mats Berntoft	Magnusson; Kreuger	3:48
5.	"Something Better"	Michael Scherchen; Deborah Ffrench; Joe Cang; Grant Black; Teressa Wilcox	Magnusson; Kreuger	3:34
6.	"Almost Me"	Tammin Sursok; Kotecha; Magnusson; Kreuger	Magnusson; Kreuger	3:38
7.	"Tender"	Steve Robson; Karen Poole	Magnusson; Kreuger	3:44
8.	"Backwards Again"	Kenneth Karlin; Carsten Schack; A. Cantrell; P. Whit	Kreuger	4:09
9.	"It's a Beautiful Thing"	Matthew Gerrard; Bridget Benenate; Steve Booker	Matthew Gerrard	3:16
10.	"Better to Be Lonely"	Meredith Brooks; Taylor Rhodes; Shelly Peiken	Gerrard	3:44
11.	"Ordinary Day"	Sursok; Fredrik Rinman; Malcolm Pardon	Magnusson; Kreuger	3:42
12.	"Around the World"	Sursok; Barbara Griffin	Sursok; Kreuger	3:36
Total length:				44:17

== Charts ==
Chart (2005)	Peak position
Australian Albums (ARIA)	13

== Outtakes ==
- "Karma" (Sursok, Michael Strangel, David Nicholas) - Recorded by Tammin
- "Selfish" (Sursok, Brooke McClymont) - Recorded by Brooke McClymont
