= Albino Farm =

- Promotional film poster
- Directed by: Joe Anderson; Sean McEwen
- Written by: Joe Anderson; Sean McEwen
- Produced by: Rachelle Ryan; Jason Stewart; Joe Anderson; Sean McEwen
- Starring: Chris Jericho; Richard Christy; Tammin Sursok; Alex Neustaedter
- Cinematography: René Jung
- Edited by: Dan O'Brien
- Music by: Scott Rockenfield
- Distributed by: Anxiety Island Entertainment
- Release date: September 22, 2009
- Running time: 90 minutes
- Country: United States
- Language: English

Albino Farm is a 2009 horror film written and directed and written by Joe Anderson and Sean McEwen. It stars Chris Jericho, Richard Christy, Tammin Sursok, and Alex Neustaedter. The music was composed by Scott Rockenfield.

The movie follows four college students who stumble across a murderous rural community in the Ozark Mountains. The story is loosely based on a Missouri urban legend.

== Plot ==
Stacey, Melody, Brian, and Sanjay, a group of college students, are traveling through the Ozark Mountains region, working on a history research project about rural American customs and legends. They encounter several eccentric and physically deformed locals. When their SUV gets a flat tire, they acquire a new one from Jeremiah, a blind elderly man who speaks incoherently. Brian, the jerk of the group, deliberately underpays Jeremiah.

The students stumble across a revival meeting, where they learn about the supposed legend of the Albino Farm. They arrive in a small town of Shiloh and start looking for the Albino Farm, ignoring warnings from the locals, many of whom seem to have various deformities. They meet Levi and his two deaf friends, who agree to take them to the Albino Farm for twenty-five dollars and a view of Melody's breasts.

When they reach the gates, a fight between Levi and Brian breaks out. Levi and his buddies drive off, leaving the students on their own. Brian and Melody enter an old house and Brian sees a person and chases after them, with Melody following. Brian gets captured by a group of deformed and violent individuals living on the farm and is killed. When the rest of the group goes searching for Brian, Melody gets separated from the group and gets killed as well.

Meanwhile, Sanjay and Stacey keep searching for their missing friends, eventually arriving at the farm. They find evidence of earlier victims and are soon pursued by the same group of disfigured inhabitants. After being captured, Sanjay and Stacey wake up in an underground cave with their arms sewn together. They manage to tear themselves apart and attempt to escape, fighting off their captors in the process.

During the escape, Sanjay sacrifices himself by causing an explosion that kills him and several attackers, and renders Stacey unconscious. After recovering, she finds the revival meeting tent and seeks help. Inside, she discovers that the preacher has albinism, and the rest of the congregation exhibit various physical deformities. Stacey begins to laugh uncontrollably as the congregation breaks into song.

== Inspiration ==
The movie's story is inspired by the urban legends, widespread in north Springfield, surrounding Springlawn Farm, also known as Sheedy Farm and Headley Farm. One legend tells about college students exploring to the Ozark Mountains, who never came back from the farm. Others describe a scary caretaker with albinism stalking the farm, or a secret hospital, where a group of people with albinism are doomed to roam the farm at night. Albino Farm incorporates several of these ideas into its plot.

Similar legends exist in other places in the Midwestern United States, for example the rumours of an "albino farm" in Hummel Park, North Omaha, Nebraska.

== Cast ==
- Tammin Sursok as Stacey
- Chris Jericho as Levi
- Richard Christy as Caleb
- Duane Whitaker as Jeremiah
- Alex Neustaedter as Samuel
- Sunkrish Bala as Sanjay
- Nick Richey as Brian
- Alicia Lagano as Melody
- Kevin Spirtas as Preacher
- Christopher Michael White as Jacob
- Bianca Barnett as Pig Bitch
- Paul Ford as Old Dwarf
- Shelby Janes as Shelby
- Joicie Appell as Ruth
- Jackson Curtis as Mute Boy
- Troy Dunkle as Pin Head
- Ryan Shields as Big Eye
- Mike Strain Jr. as Smash Face
- Barry Curtis as Split Lip
- Beth Graveman as Bird Girl

== Production ==
Albino Farm was shot in Marionville, Missouri. It was also filmed in nearby Warrensburg and just outside Willard. The costumes and make-up were created by special effects and makeup artist Jason Barnett.

== Release ==
The film was released by MTI Home Video on September 22, 2009 with a time from 90 minutes, the German FSK 18 DVD runs 85 minutes.

== Reception ==
The film has a 14% on Rotten Tomatoes.

Dread Central panned the film, awarding it a score of 1 1/2 out of 5, writing "Albino Farm can be summed up in one word: “unremarkable”. An unremarkable script, unremarkable score, unremarkable cinematography, unremarkable (and even occasionally downright poor) editing and direction, and a swimming-through-treacle first two acts all conspire to remove any possibility of a recommendation. Once the violence kicks off it's relatively entertaining, but I wouldn't blame you if you can't make it that far". Kurt Dahlke from DVD Talk gave the film a negative review, complimenting the film's make-up but criticized the film's lack of originality, and overuse of teen horror clichés.

Several scholars have criticized Albino Farm for being one of the movies perpetuating negative stereotypes of the American rural poor and people with albinism.
