= Hate You =

Hate You may refer to:

- "Hate You" (2NE1 song), 2011
- "Hate You" (Daredevils song), 1996
- "Hate You" (Ladies' Code song), 2013
- "Hate You", a song by Ingrid Michaelson from the album Stranger Songs
- "Hate You", a song by Jung Kook from the album Golden
- "Hate You", a song by Myles Smith from the album My Mess, My Heart, My Life.
- "H.A.T.E.U.", a song by Mariah Carey from Memoirs of an Imperfect Angel

== See also ==
- I Hate You (disambiguation)
