= Thijs van Leer =

Dutch musician (born 1948)

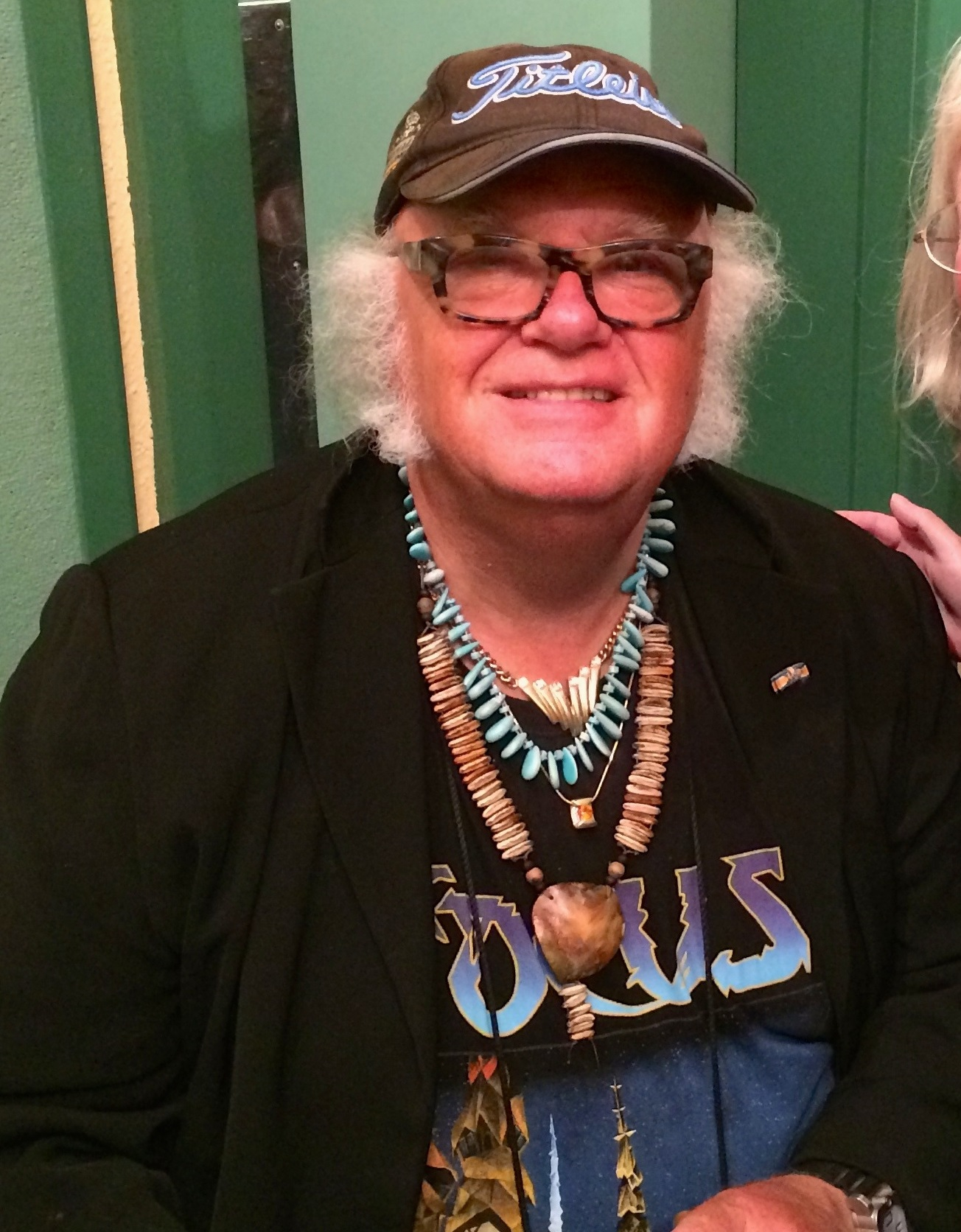
- van Leer in 2014

Background information
- Born: 31 March 1948 (age 78); Amsterdam, Netherlands
- Origin: Amsterdam, Netherlands
- Genres: Progressive rock; jazz rock; classical rock
- Instruments: Flute; keyboards; vocals
- Years active: 1967–present
- Labels: Sire Records; EMI; CBS; Ariola
- Formerly of: Trio Thijs van Leer; Focus; Conxi; Pedal Point; Van Leer

Thijs van Leer (Dutch pronunciation: [ˈtɛis fɑn ˈleːr]; born 31 March 1948) is a Dutch musician, best known as the founding member of the rock band Focus as its primary vocalist, keyboardist, and flautist. Born and raised in Amsterdam among a musical family, van Leer took up the piano and flute as a child and pursued them at university and music academies.

From 1967 to 1969, van Leer was backing vocalist and musician in a theatre cabaret act headed by Ramses Shaffy; recorded singles as a solo artist; and produced, arranged, and conducted music for Bojoura. He formed Trio Thijs van Leer, a three-piece rock band which evolved into Focus in late 1969 following the addition of guitarist Jan Akkerman. Focus achieved international success following the release of Moving Waves (1971) and its lead single, "Hocus Pocus", which features van Leer's yodelling and whistling. After several albums with various line-ups, van Leer disbanded Focus in 1978; he reformed the band in 2002.

Van Leer achieved success as a solo artist in the Netherlands. He has collaborated with various artists, and continues to release albums and perform in various capacities. In 2008, van Leer was made a Knight of the Order of Orange-Nassau for special services to music.

== Early life ==
Van Leer was born on 31 March 1948 in Amsterdam. His father Ed, a Jewish refugee from the Netherlands, was a classically trained flautist and businessman; his mother Mary was a singer and involved in the Sufi Movement. Van Leer began playing the piano at age three, taught by his mother, and later received lessons from pianists Maria Stroo (later Marja Bon) and Gerard Hengeveld. When he was six, van Leer wrote his first composition, "Uncle Willy", as a tribute to family friend and keyboard teacher Willy Buard who helped pay for his father's flute studies at the Conservatoire de Musique de Genève in Geneva. At age eleven, van Leer was given a flute by his father, who began teaching his son two years later after he discovered that van Leer wished to pursue jazz music instead after he discovered the genre, particularly through Miles Davis albums. He said, "I suppose I wanted to reject what I was brought up on. But then I thought the combination of jazz and classical music could be used in rock." With his parents and two brothers, Frank (the eldest) and Maarten (the youngest) who played the bassoon and piano and flute respectively, the family would often play music at home together. Van Leer also took up painting, modelling, and performing in plays.

Van Leer attended Hilversum Grammar School where he learnt English, French, German, Latin and Ancient Greek. His father was the conductor of the school orchestra, for which van Leer played the harpsichord. He joined the Raoul Angenot Quintet, and at eighteen, won an award at inter-school contests for playing Mozart's Andante in C Major on the flute, singing an original love poem to "Stella by Starlight" by Victor Young, a drama improvisation featuring his own poetry, and an original piano composition entitled "Nooit Zal Ik Vergeten (De Nachten Samen met Jou)" ("Never Shall I Forget (The Nights Together with You)". He then joined the Bob de Lat Quartet, who once came fifth in the annual Hilversum jazz contest. After leaving grammar school, van Leer did not feel confident enough to attend a music school, so he studied art history at the University of Amsterdam which he found "very dry". He then learnt harmony and counterpoint at the Conservatorium van Amsterdam, but disliked the lessons and left early. This was followed by a degree in the flute and composition at the Conservatoire de Musique de Genève. Van Leer also received tutoring on the piano, orchestration and arrangement with composer and conductor Rogier van Otterloo, and organ with Anthon van der Horst. During his time studying, van Leer participated in plays including those by William Shakespeare and John Webster. Van Leer has cited Steve Winwood, Traffic, Brian Wilson, and The Beach Boys as musical influences who helped inspire him to pursue rock music, with Béla Bartók and Johann Sebastian Bach among his favourite composers.

== Career ==
=== With Ramses Shaffy ===
Around 1967, van Leer recorded "Nooit Zal Ik Vergeten" which Phonogram Records released as a 7-inch single which received little attention. In December 1967, during his first year at the University of Amsterdam, van Leer, unhappy with the course, landed a leading role in the Webster play The Duchess of Malfi. At one rehearsal, he learned from radio and television presenter Willem Duys that singer and actor Ramses Shaffy was in the process of hiring a final member to his four-piece backing band and vocal group for his upcoming theatre act, Shaffy Chantant. Van Leer had seen Shaffy's performances before and enjoyed the singing and jazz-oriented songs. After he called Shaffy and insisted he was suitable for the part, van Leer got an audition within the hour and secretly took his mother's car to get there. Had the audition failed, van Leer later said he would have pursued an acting career. With a performance of "Nooit Zal Ik Vergeten" at the piano, Shaffy was impressed and added van Leer to the cast which included singer Liesbeth List and pianist Louis van Dijk. Shaffy Chantant ran for almost one year from February 1968 for six nights a week, and van Leer was paid 114 guilders a week. A recording of the act was released in 1968 by Philips Records; van Leer learned from Shaffy years later that the track "Jij Bent Nu Daarbinnen" ("You Are Now Within") was about him.

In 1968, during his time with Shaffy, van Leer recorded his second solo single on Philips, "Zolang de Wereld Nog Draait" ("As Long As the World Still Turns"), a Dutch-language version of "Les Bicyclettes de Belsize" by Engelbert Humperdinck. This landed him an invitation from drummer Hans Cleuver in September 1968 to play the flute with bassist Martijn Dresden and himself on Jazz and Poetry, a program on the KRO radio station. For several months they performed on the station with van Leer on the piano, organ, and the addition of "strange" vocals. Van Leer stayed with Shaffy for his next play Shaffy Verkeerd, which opened in January 1969 and featured singer Anneke Grönloh and performances of "MacArthur Park" by Jimmy Webb and "I Shall Be Released" by Bob Dylan, two songs that influenced van Leer as it "Opened my eyes to the use of lyrics. Before that I only really concentrated on instrumental music". Van Leer's final show with Shaffy was Sunset Sunkiss, which received an album release in 1969 on the Philips label with Cleuver and Dresden in the band. This was followed by several performances from the group at some large venues, including shows at the Holland Festival backed by the Metropole Orchestra, the Carré Theatre, and the RAI Centre.

=== Focus and collaborations ===
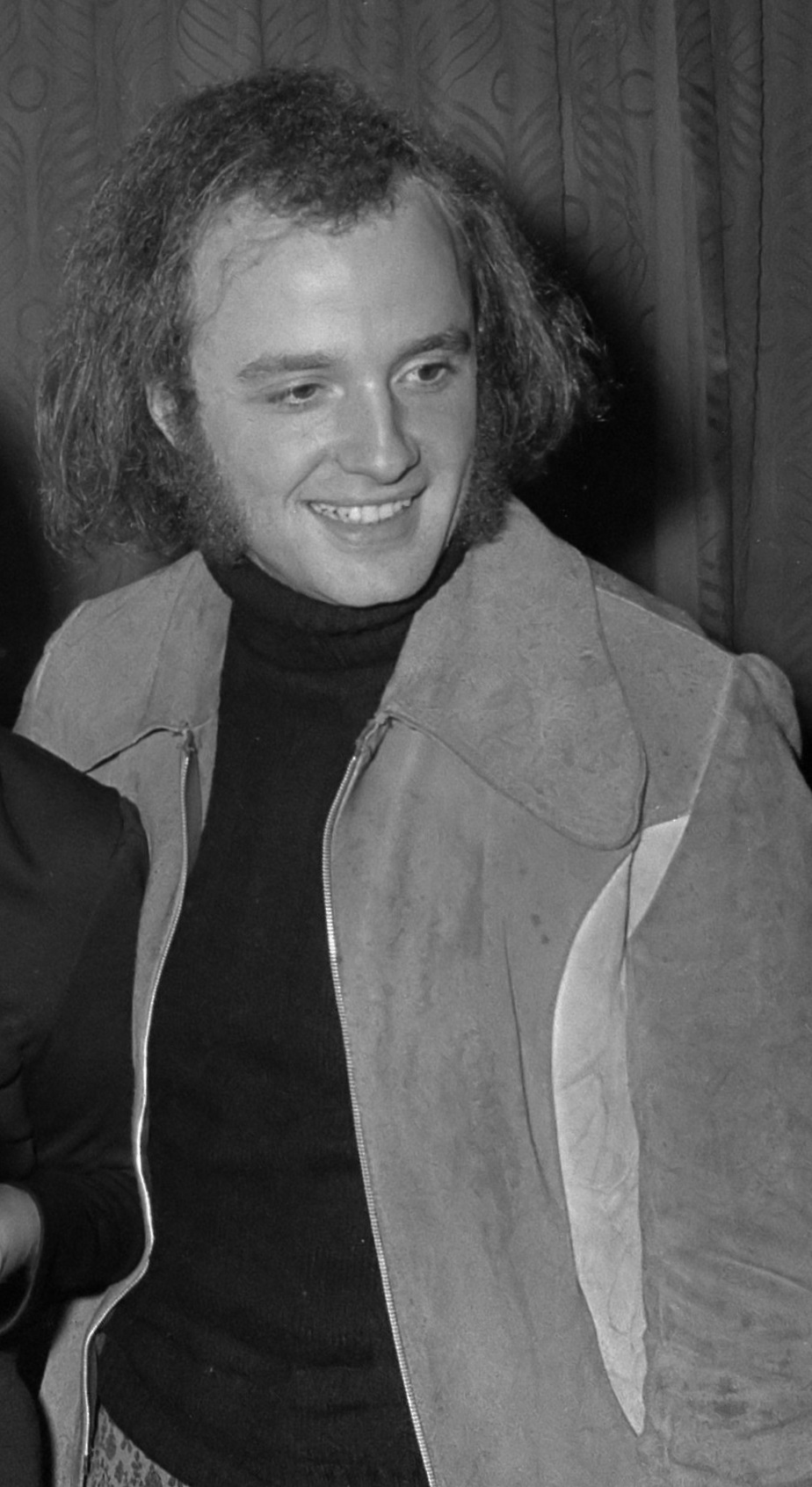
van Leer in November 1971

After van Leer left Shaffy's theatre group in mid-1969, he formed a three-piece rock band with Cleuver and Dresden, playing local gigs with a set of covers by Traffic and their own material under the early names of Trio Thijs van Leer and Thijs van Leer and the Rebaptised. They also recorded several radio and television commercials. In November 1969 they were joined by guitarist Jan Akkerman, who had performed with the three on Sunset Sunkiss, and settled on the name Focus, thus completing the first line-up of the band. From December 1969 to June 1970, the four were members of the pit band for the Dutch performance of the rock musical Hair.

Focus released their first album, Focus Plays Focus, better known as its international title In and Out of Focus, in August 1970. Van Leer became a prominent figure in the group, writing the majority of their songs and singing English lyrics. After a line-up change, the band released Moving Waves (1971) that included their international hit single "Hocus Pocus" which featured van Leer's distinct vocals, yodelling, whistling, and scat singing. His influence from the Sufi movement through his mother is displayed in "Moving Waves", a piano and vocal composition he wrote when he was sixteen and quotes a teaching from its creator, Inayat Khan. The album closes with "Eruption", a 22-minute track that is "based on a musical idea" by van Leer who gained inspiration from the operas Orfeo ed Euridice by Christoph Willibald Gluck and L'Orfeo by Claudio Monteverdi, combining rock, jazz and classical influences. Focus 3 (1972) includes the band's second hit single "Sylvia" and includes van Leer's organ and operatic vocals. Van Leer's classical background is evident on the van Leer/Akkerman penned title track on Hamburger Concerto from 1974, based on Variations on a Theme by Haydn by Johannes Brahms. The miniature "Delitiae Musicae" equally belongs to Monteverdi.

In 1969, van Leer played the flute on Love Me or Leave Me (1969) by Dutch singer Rita Hovink. The following year, van Leer wrote, arranged and conducted music for singer Bojoura for her third album, The Beauty of Bojoura (1970). She had previously worked with van Leer's trio with Shaffy, singing a cover of "Frank Mills" from Hair. Robin Lent used van Leer to play piano and flute on Scarecrow's Journey (1971), and arranged and played the flute on the Dutch cast production album of Oh! Calcutta! (1971).

Van Leer headed Focus through several line-up changes, and by early 1976 he was the only remaining original member; the group disbanded in 1978.

In 2001, van Leer reformed Focus which has since released the albums Focus 8 (2002), Focus 9 / New Skin (2006), "Live In Europe" (2009), Focus X (2012),, Golden Oldies (2014), Focus 8.5 / Beyond the Horizon (2016), The Focus Family Album (2017), Focus 11 (2018), Focus50: Live in Rio (2021), Completely Focussed (2021) and Focus 12 (2024).

=== Solo career and other projects ===
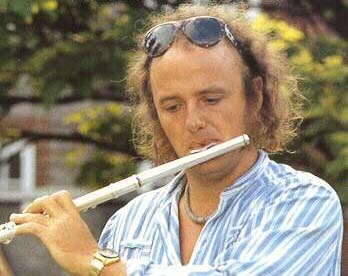
van Leer circa 1970s

In mid-1972, after securing a solo recording deal with CBS Records, van Leer released his first solo album, Introspection. It features a selection of classical pieces by Bach and Gabriel Faure, Focus songs, and original compositions arranged for flute and orchestra by van Otterloo, and soprano vocals by Letty de Jong. Introspection was a commercial success in the Netherlands, reaching number one for three weeks in early 1973 and earning a gold certification. In late 1975, van Leer released Introspection 2 which spent one week at number one in the Netherlands during a 19-week stay in the top 10. Van Leer continued the album series with Introspection 3, in 1977.

After Focus split in 1978, van Leer continued with his solo career and took part in various projects. He formed the rock band Conxi, featuring Dutch and Senegalese musicians, and a rock group Van Leer with an American singer.

In the early 1980s, van Leer worked and toured with Spanish singer Miguel Ríos playing keyboards and flute on his albums Extraños en el escaparate (1981), Rock & Ríos (1982) and El rock de una noche de verano (1983).

In 1981, van Leer formed the multi-national band Pedal Point with musicians Tato Gomez and Mario Argandoña from Chile and Paul Shigihara from Japan. They recorded a double album, Dona Nobis Pacem, based on a composition van Leer had written that he later cited as "one of the most important compositions of mine", and a high point of his career in an artistic sense.

In 1985, van Leer reunited with Akkerman and together recorded Focus: Jan Akkerman & Thijs van Leer (1985).

Van Leer was one of the artists who recorded the song Shalom from Holland (written by Simon Hammelburg and Ron Klipstein) as a token of solidarity to the Israeli people, threatened by missiles from Iraq, during the first Gulf War in 1991.

He also appeared as a guest musician on the album, Into the Electric Castle, by Arjen Anthony Lucassen's musical project Ayreon.

In 2008, Explore Multimedia released van Leer's first solo album in almost a decade, The Home Concert. The album features recordings made in his living room as he played material for Focus 9. The album is exclusively available online.

On 13 September 2008, van Leer was made a Knight of the Order of Orange-Nassau for "special services to music."

In 2010, van Leer performed at a concert with Raccomandata Ricevuta Ritorno to celebrate 40 years of imaginative music

== Discography ==
Solo albums

- Introspection (1972)
- O My Love (1975)
- Introspection 2 (1975)
- Musica per la Notte di Natale (1976)
- Introspection 3 (1977)
- Nice to Have Met You (1978) - Recorded in 1977.
- Introspection 4 (1979)
- Collage (1980)
- Pedal Point: Dona Nobis Pacem' (1981)
- Reflections (1981)
- Focus (Jan Akkerman & Thijs van Leer album) (1985) - Recorded in 1984.
- Renaissance (1986)
- I Hate Myself (For Loving You) (1987)
- Introspection '92 (1992)
- Musical Melody (1994)
- Bolero (1996; CD version of the Reflections with two extra tracks)
- Summertime (1996)
- Joy to the World (1996)
- Instrumental Hymns (1997)
- The Glorious Album (1999; reissued in 2000 as 12 Mooiste Liederen (12 Most Beautiful Songs))
- Bach for a New Age (1999)
- Etudes Sans Gêne (2006; limited edition DVD) - Recorded in 2001.
- The Home Concert (2008) - Recorded in 2005.
- Sir Thijs van Leer: Live at Trading Boundaries (2015) - Recorded in 2014.

with Thomas Blug Band

- Guitar From The Heart/Live (2005; DVD)
- Guitar From The Heart – Live in Raalte, NL (2005)
- Soul & Pepper (2009)
