= Josie & Jack =

2019 film by Sarah Lancaster

- Theatrical release poster
- Directed by: Sarah Lancaster
- Written by: Kelly Braffet; Sarah Lancaster
- Based on: Josie & Jack by Kelly Braffet
- Produced by: Blake Goza; Jonathon Komack Martin
- Starring: Olivia DeJonge; Alex Neustaedter; Owen Campbell; William Fichtner
- Cinematography: Mike Simpson
- Edited by: Matt Latham
- Music by: Zach Robinson
- Production companies: Mountain Men Films; The Komack Company
- Distributed by: Quiver Distribution
- Release date: October 24, 2019 (DTLA Film Festival)
- Running time: 103 minutes
- Country: United States
- Language: English

Josie & Jack is a 2019 American tragedy film directed by Sarah Lancaster and starring Olivia DeJonge and Alex Neustaedter. It is based on Kelly Braffet's 2005 novel of the same name. It is also Lancaster's directorial debut.

== Premise ==
Seventeen-year old Josie, and her older brother Jack, are homeschooled and raised by their abusive alcoholic physics professor father, but they dream of escaping their life of bleak isolation.

== Cast ==
- Olivia DeJonge as Josie Raeburn
  - Cate Elefante as Young Josie Raeburn
- Alex Neustaedter as Jack Raeburn
  - AJ Kane as Young Jack Raeburn
- Owen Campbell as Kevin
- William Fichtner as Joseph Raeburn
- Annabelle Dexter-Jones as Lily
- Anna Baryshnikov as Becka
- Brendan Hines as Ben Sorrels
- David H. Holmes as Mark
- Nicholas Gorham as Carmichael
- Emma Kikue as Maris
- Eric Troy Miller as Joe
- Bobby Daniel Rodriguez as Luis

== Production ==
The film was shot in Staten Island.
