= Alex Neustaedter =

American actor (born 1998)

Alexander Neustaedter
- Born: March 29, 1998 (age 28); Shawnee Mission, Kansas, U.S.
- Occupation: Actor
- Years active: 2009–present

Alexander Francis Neustaedter (born March 29, 1998) is an American actor. He is best known for playing Bram Bowman in Colony.

== Career ==
In 2009, Neustaedter debuted in the film Albino Farm, playing Samuel. In 2010, he starred as Caleb Johnson in Last Breath. In the following years, he participated in several short films, including Deerhunter (2009), as a prisoner; Charlie (2012), as Kevin; Frame of Mind (2013), as Keith Arbor; and Let Go (2015), as Jacob Elliot. In 2016, Neustaedter joined the main cast of USA Network's TV series Colony as Bram Bowman. He also stars in the film Shovel Buddies, which had its world premiere at South by Southwest on March 14, 2016. In 2018, he starred as the main character, Miles Hill, in A.X.L.

== Filmography ==
=== Film ===
Year	Title	Role	Notes
2009	Albino Farm	Samuel	
2010	Last Breath	Caleb Johnson	
2016	Ithaca	Homer Macauley	
2016	Shovel Buddies	Jimmy Gibbons	
2017	Walking Out	Cal	
2017	The Tribes of Palos Verdes	Alex	
2018	A.X.L.	Miles Hill	
2018	American Woman	Tyler Hanrick	
2019	Josie & Jack	Jack Raeburn	
2019	Low Tide	Red	
2021	Things Heard & Seen	Eddie Lucks	
2024	It Ends with Us	Young Atlas Corrigan	
2025	The Running Man	Greg	

=== Television ===
Year	Title	Role	Notes
2013	Agents of S.H.I.E.L.D.	Christian Ward	Episode: "The Well"
2014	Only Human	Young Thomas	TV movie
2016–2018	Colony	Bram Bowman	Main role
2021–2024	American Rust	Billy Poe	Main role
2026	Law and Order	Leo Brady	Episode: Dream On

=== Music videos ===
Year	Song	Artist	Notes
2011	"Busy Bein' Born"	Middle Class Rut	Guest appearance
2012	"Slaves to Substance"	Suicide Silence	Guest appearance
2014	"I Bet My Life"	Imagine Dragons	Guest appearance
