= Spectacular! =

2009 film

- Poster
- Written by: Jim Kreig
- Directed by: Robert Iscove
- Starring: Nolan Gerard Funk; Tammin Sursok; Victoria Justice; Simon Curtis; Matthew Bennett; Greg Germann; Andrea Lewis; Shannon Chan-Kent; Joel Ballard; Avan Jogia
- Theme music composer: Michael Wandmacher
- Countries of origin: United States; Canada
- Original language: English

Production
- Producers: Jessica Horowitz; Michael Espensen; Lauren Levine; Scott McAboy; Bill O'Dowd
- Cinematography: David Moxness
- Editor: Casey O. Rohrs
- Running time: 93 minutes
- Production companies: Pacific Bay Entertainment Canada; Lion Share Productions; Dolphin Entertainment; Alloy Productions

Original release
- Network: Nickelodeon
- Release: February 16, 2009
- Network: YTV
- Release: May 8, 2009

Spectacular! is a 2009 musical television film that aired on Nickelodeon and YTV. It stars Nolan Gerard Funk, Tammin Sursok, Victoria Justice and Simon Curtis with Matthew Bennett, Andrea Lewis, Shannon Chan-Kent, Joel Ballard, and Avan Jogia in supporting roles. Filmed in Vancouver, it premiered on February 16, 2009 on Nickelodeon, and YTV on May 8, 2009. The soundtrack was released on February 3, 2009, with a full webstream on MTV.com released the previous week.

Spectacular! attracted 3.7 million viewers during its premiere.

== Plot ==
Nikko Alexander (Nolan Gerard Funk), the talented but cocky lead singer of the band Flux, arrives late for his performance at a local club (“Don’t Tell Me”), to the annoyance of his bandmates (Harris Allan, Jesse Moss). At the end of their performance, Nikko destroys an amp, leading to the remaining members of Flux to kick him out of the band, and his girlfriend Amy (Britt Irvin) to dump him. Courtney Lane (Tammin Sursok), the leader of a high school show choir called Spectacular!, attempts to recruit Nikko for her group, who declines, although she convinces him to watch Spectacular! perform at a local carnival before making his decision.

At the carnival, Nikko witnesses Spectacular!’s shoddy performance of “Eye of the Tiger,” as well as rival group Ta-Da’s much superior performance of “The Things We Do for Love,” led by the cold-hearted Tammi Dyson (Victoria Justice) and her boyfriend Royce du Lac (Simon Curtis), who used to date Courtney. Courtney again tries to recruit Nikko, even offering him half of the $10,000 prize money should they win Nationals, but he again declines, viewing it as selling out.

Nikko tells his brother Stavros (Christopher Jacot) that he has been kicked out of Flux, who reacts positively, saying Nikko needs to focus on his future. Nikko retorts that he has an appointment with famous record producer Rich Dickinson (Matthew Bennett), and storms off. Nikko does not have an appointment, but instead gets in front of Dickinson under the guise of being an act called “Splattered Brains.” Dickinson is impressed with Nikko’s talent and moxie, but informs him that he needs $5,000 to produce a demo in order to sell him, leading to Nikko reconsidering Courtney's offer of half the prize money.

When Nikko approaches a downtrodden Spectacular!, including the optimistic Caspian (Joel Ballard), the dim-witted Janet (Shannon Chan-Kent), the accident-prone Robin (Andrea Lewis), the verbose Tajid (Avan Jogia), and their apathetic faculty advisor Mr. Romano (Greg Germann) about joining, Courtney rebuffs him due to his prior rudeness, but Nikko impresses the rest of Spectacular! (“Break My Heart”) and she acquiesces. Nikko struggles in rehearsal (“Dance with Me”), not understanding why everything must be so choreographed, while Courtney dislikes his lack of care for structure.

At Nikko’s first performance with Spectacular!, he witnesses Ta-Da’s performance (“Lonely Love Song”) and Tammi’s mocking attitude towards Spectacular!, and becomes determined to best Ta-Da at Nationals. At their next vocal rehearsal, Nikko encourages the members of Spectacular! to break free from Courtney’s imposed rigidity and have more fun with their performance (“Your Own Way”), and is supported by Mr. Romano. However, the rest of Spectacular! is still skeptical, so they plan to meet secretly meet on Nikko’s roof to work on a new performance style, without Courtney (“Dance with Me”), leading to Nikko bonding further with the members of Spectacular!. Stavros finds Nikko’s show choir outfit and confronts him for joining another band, and Nikko lies about having gotten a job, saying the costume is his work uniform.

Nikko joins Courtney, Caspian, and Janet on Spectacular!’s yearly tradition of going bowling together before a show, where they find Tammi and Royce in their lane. After a brief confrontation, Nikko convinces them to forgo bowling, but rather play a video game called Rock the World (similar to Rock Band). The group performs “For the First Time,” a song that was once Courtney and Royce’s signature duet, during which Courtney and Nikko realize their attraction to one another.

After leaving the bowling alley, the group surprises Courtney with a performance of “Your Own Way” on Nikko’s roof. Courtney is heartbroken that Nikko has turned Spectacular! against her, and reveals that he only joined because she promised him half the prize money should they win. The rest of Spectacular! turns against both Courtney and Nikko, and leaves.

Courtney goes home, and sees Royce waiting for him wanting to get back with her. Nikko arrives to apologize to Courtney, where he and Royce have a brief altercation before Royce leaves. Nikko apologizes, and Courtney admits that her methods have been holding Spectacular! back. Courtney’s mother (Venus Terzo) encourages them to push the envelope, and Courtney brings Nikko back to the group.

At the next Spectacular! rehearsal, Courtney and Nikko apologize, and Courtney agrees to be less uptight. They decide they need a new song, and Mr. Romano, who has been reinvigorated by Nikko’s energy, suggests “Something to Believe In,” a famous bootleg by popular rock band Herringbone, whom Nikko idolizes. As the group begins intense auditions (“Just Freak”), Dickinson visits Nikko and Stavros and reveals that the label wants to hear him perform live, but the only availability is the same night as Nationals. Nikko attempts to tell Courtney, but he can’t bring himself to do it. Amy informs Stavros of Nikko’s lies, and they confront him at rehearsal, where they convince him to leave Spectacular! once again, leaving Courtney heartbroken again.

Mr. Romano visits Nikko, who is struggling to decide what to do. He reveals that he is Joey Rome, the frontman of Herringbone, and that the band broke up because he was scared of the future, not because they didn’t want to sell out, as is popularly believed, and tells him to make sure whatever choice he makes, to make sure it’s what he really wants. As Nikko leaves for the audition with Flux, Courtney tearfully wishes him luck and kisses him on the cheek. At the audition, the label is not interested in Nikko. Stavros and Dickinson tell him that they know he’s better than this, and he asks them to let him show them “where [his] heart is.”

At Nationals, Ta-Da impresses the judges (“On the Wings of a Dream”), and the members of Spectacular! are fearful. Spectacular! begins performing “Something to Believe In,” with Caspian as the male lead. However, Nikko, much to Courtney’s surprise and delight, appears at the back of the stage and joins the performance, along with the members of Flux. Robin accidentally knocks Amy off of her riser, and Mr. Romano, performing as Joey Rome for the first time since Herringbone, steps in. Nikko and Courtney reconcile, and the group receives a standing ovation.

Spectacular! is disqualified from the competition for having unregistered performers, and Ta-Da wins. Tammi dumps Royce immediately after leaving the stage, leaving him deflated. Dickinson offers Flux a recording contract, and Nikko and Courtney share their first kiss. Later, Flux records their first single, with Courtney joining him as lead vocalist and the rest of Spectacular! singing backup ("Everything Can Change").

== Cast ==
- Nolan Gerard Funk as Nikko Alexander
- Tammin Sursok as Courtney Lane
- Victoria Justice as Tammi Dyson
- Simon Curtis as Royce du Lac
- Matthew Bennett as Rick Dickinson
- Andrea Lewis as Robin
- Venus Terzo as Marion Lane
- Joel Ballard as Caspian
- Avan Jogia as Tajid
- Shannon Chan-Kent as Janet
- Christopher Jacot as Stavros Alexander
- Britt Irvin as Amy Fenton
- Harris Allan as Eric Gapaloo
- Jesse Moss as Nils Aranson
- Greg Germann as Mr. Romano

== Soundtrack ==
The soundtrack album was released February 3, 2009, by Nick Records, featuring the songs from the film.

== Release ==
The premiere of the movie was viewed by 3.3 million viewers. The DVD of the film was released on March 31, 2009, in the US, and on October 7, 2009, in Australia.
