= Whatever Will Be (song) =

2005 single by Tammin Sursok

Single by Tammin

from the album Whatever Will Be
- B-side: "Around the World"
- Released: 28 March 2005
- Studio: The Location (Stockholm, Sweden)
- Length: 3:47
- Label: Random; Sony BMG Music Entertainment
- Songwriters: Jake Schulze; Savan Kotecha; Carl Falk
- Producers: Jake Schulze; Kalle Engström; Carl Falk

Tammin singles chronology
| "Pointless Relationship" (2004) | "Whatever Will Be" (2005) | "It's a Beautiful Thing" (2005) |

"Whatever Will Be" is the second song released by Australian actress Tammin from her first album, Whatever Will Be (2005). Issued as a CD single on 28 March 2005, "Whatever Will Be" reached number 13 on the Australian Singles Chart. Vanessa Hudgens covered the song on her debut studio album, V (2006).

== Background ==
The song is about how you should not take life too seriously and just to take every day as it comes. It is about how you should not regret the past and look towards the future.

== Chart performance ==
On 4 April 2005, "Whatever Will Be" made its official debut on the Australian ARIA Singles Chart at number 13. On 11 April, the song dropped 11 spots, to number 24. It spent a further eight weeks rising and falling within the top 30 until leaving the top 30 on 19 June and the top 50 on 17 July.

== Track listing ==
Australian CD single

1. "Whatever Will Be"
2. "Whatever Will Be" (Metro mix)
3. "Whatever Will Be" (Location mix)
4. "Around the World"
5. "Pointless Relationship" (video)

== Credits and personnel ==
Credits are lifted from the Whatever Will Be liner notes.

Studios

- Recorded and mixed at The Location (Stockholm, Sweden)
- Mastered at Studio 301 (Sydney, Australia)

Personnel

- Jake Schulze – writing, all other instruments, programming, production, recording, mixing, arrangement
- Savan Kotecha – writing, Hyperboard extension engineering
- Carl Falk – writing, all other instruments, programming, production, recording, arrangement
- Anna Nordell – background vocals
- Jurl – background vocals
- Linnea – background vocals
- Sebastian Thott – acoustic guitars
- Karl Engström – electric guitars
- Tomas Lindberg – bass
- Kalle Engström – all other instruments, programming, production, recording, mixing, arrangement
- Ray Hedges – remixing
- Don Bartley – mastering

== Charts ==
=== Weekly charts ===
| Chart (2005) | Peak position |
|---|---|
| Australia (ARIA) | 13 |

=== Year-end charts ===
| Chart (2005) | Position |
|---|---|
| Australia (ARIA) | 98 |
