= Myriads =

Norwegian gothic metal band

- Origin: Stavanger, Norway
- Genres: Gothic metal
- Years active: 1997–present
- Labels: Napalm Records
- Members: Alexander Twiss; J.P. Rudi Jünger; Mona Undheim Skottene
- Past members: Mikael Stokdal
- Website: http://www.myriads.no/

Myriads is a gothic metal band from Norway. Myriads was formed in September 1997, in Stavanger on the west coast of Norway.

== Biography ==
Myriads' music is a fusion between metal and classical sounds. It also contains some elements of folk music and has some industrial parts. Their lyrics are written by Alexander Twiss and Mona Undheim Skottene and are based on psychology, philosophy, and dreams, with dramatical elements. Especially on Introspection the lyrics are more heavily inspired by psychology than the lyrics on In Spheres Without Time.

In July 1998 Myriads recorded a four track demo-CD entitled In Spheres Without Time at Mansion Studio in Stavanger, produced by Øyvind Grødem. The demo-CD has sold out.

The 9 April 1999 Myriads signed a record deal with Napalm Records. In June they recorded their first full-length album, also entitled "In Spheres Without Time" in Mansion Studio. The album was produced by Myriads and Øyvind Grødem, and mastered at Masterhuset. It was released worldwide 22 November 1999.

In March 2001 Myriads recorded their second album, titled Introspection, in Tico Tico Studio (Children of Bodom, Sentenced and Impaled Nazarene) in Finland. It was produced by Myriads and engineered by Ahti Kortelainen in 5 weeks. Introspection was mixed by Ahti Kortelainen and Alexander Twiss in one week in late August 2001. Introspection was mastered by Göran Finnberg at The Mastering Room in January 2002.

The material on Introspection is more varied than that on In Spheres Without Time. The members of Myriads have all progressively developed as musicians, and the music is somewhat more technical now than it was earlier. Some songs are faster and heavier than the songs on In Spheres Without Time. In contrast, "Inside" consists of Mona's and Alexander's vocals together with a piano, a male choir, a string-sextet and an acoustic guitar. The acoustic guitar is more frequently used on Introspection than it was on In Spheres Without Time. "Falling in the Equinox" is a totally acoustic song featuring Mona's and Alexander's vocals. There are also some industrial parts on "Enigmatic Colours of the Night" and "Miserere Mei".

In the fall of 2003 Myriads and Mikael Stokdal have agreed on going separate ways because of different musical interests. Stokdal afterward played in the death metal band Dawn of Retaliation.

In January 2020, Myriads posted on their Facebook page that they were rehearsing again.

== Line-up ==
=== Current members ===
- Alexander Twiss (clean-vocals, death-vocals, electric guitar, and acoustic steel- and nylon-string guitars)
- Mona Undheim Skottene (vocals, main-piano and keyboard)
- J.P. (electric guitar, and acoustic steel- and nylon-string guitars)
- Rudi Jünger (drums and percussion)

=== Former members ===
- Mikael Stokdal (black-vocals, keyboard and piano)

== Discography ==
- In Spheres Without Time (1998) – demo recording
- In Spheres Without Time (1999)
- Introspection (2002)
- Demo 2010 (2010) – demo recording
