= A Holiday Romance =

- Also known as: A Song for the Season
- Written by: Darrah Cloud
- Directed by: Bobby Roth
- Starring: Naomi Judd; Andy Griffith; Gerald McRaney; Alison Pill
- Music by: Christopher Franke; Edgar Rothermich
- Country of origin: United States
- Original language: English

Production
- Executive producers: Howard Braunstein; Darrah Cloud; Michael Jaffe
- Producer: Randi Richmond
- Cinematography: Eric Van Haren Noman
- Editor: Armen Minasian
- Running time: 91 minutes
- Production company: Jaffe/Braunstein Productions

Original release
- Network: CBS
- Release: December 8, 1999

A Holiday Romance (released in the UK under the title A Song for the season) is a 1999 American made-for-television Christmas romantic drama film directed by Bobby Roth and starring Naomi Judd, Andy Griffith, and Gerald McRaney. This film has been released on DVD.

== Plot ==
At the beginning of the holiday season, a school administrator, Cal Peterson (Gerald McRaney), is sent to a financially troubled school to find a way to keep it from closing. After reviewing expenses, he decides that the best way to save money is to cancel the music program in which his niece Fern (Alison Pill) is enrolled and let go its teacher, Lily Waite (Naomi Judd). News of his decision leaks out prematurely, causing resentment among the students. After realizing how much the program has benefited his shy niece, he regrets his decision, but can think of no better alternative.

In a subplot, with Peterson's help, a long-time lady friend secretly arranges a reunion of his father Jake Peterson's WWII squadron, as a Christmas present. He is so happy that he decides to propose.

The film ends with a concert by the music department's students, where Peterson hears his niece perform and then announces that the townspeople have donated enough money to keep the program going.

== Cast ==
- Naomi Judd as Lily Waite
- Andy Griffith as Jake Peterson
- Gerald McRaney as Cal Peterson
- Alison Pill as Fern
- Jayne Eastwood as Margie
- Taborah Johnson as Anne Hutchinson
- Jackie Richardson as Bea Buskins
- Brian Heighton as Todd
- Jack Duffy as Irwin
- Sumela Kay as Clarissa
- Adam Dolson as Del
- Nathan Carter as Hal
- Martha Gibson as Donna
- Andrea Lewis as Autumn
- Aron Tager as Joseph
- Ken Wickes as Pete
- The Essentials with Paula MacNeill as singers at gas station
- Students from Port Credit Secondary School as the orchestra

== Production ==
A Holiday Romance was filmed in Toronto by Jaffe/Braunstein Productions and directed by Bobby Roth. The script was written by Darrah Cloud. The executive producers were Michael Jaffe, Howard Braunstein and Darrah Cloud.

== See also ==
- List of Christmas films
