= Colony (TV series) =

2016 American science fiction television series

- Genre: Drama; Science fiction; Dystopia
- Created by: Carlton Cuse; Ryan J. Condal
- Starring: Josh Holloway; Sarah Wayne Callies; Peter Jacobson; Amanda Righetti; Tory Kittles; Alex Neustaedter; Isabella Crovetti; Jacob Buster; Ally Walker
- Composer: Clinton Shorter
- Country of origin: United States
- Original language: English
- No. of seasons: 3
- No. of episodes: 36

Production
- Executive producers: Wes Tooke; Josh Holloway; Nelson McCormick; Juan José Campanella; Ryan J. Condal; Carlton Cuse
- Production locations: Los Angeles, California; Vancouver, British Columbia (season 3)
- Cinematography: Checco Varese; Jeffery Jur
- Editors: Rick Shane; Russell Denove; Sarah Boyd; Christopher Nelson
- Running time: 50 minutes
- Production companies: Carlton Cuse Productions (2016); Cuse Productions (2017); Genre Arts (2018); Universal Cable Productions; Legendary Television

Original release
- Network: USA Network
- Release: January 14, 2016 – July 25, 2018

Colony is an American science fiction drama television series created by Carlton Cuse and Ryan J. Condal, starring Josh Holloway and Sarah Wayne Callies. A ten-episode first season premiered with an online preview release of the first episode on USA Network's website on December 15, 2015, following the launch of a game-like website to promote the show.

The series had its broadcast premiere on USA Network on January 14, 2016. In April 2017, Colony was renewed for a third season which premiered on May 2, 2018. On July 21, 2018, USA Network announced they had cancelled the series after three seasons.

== Setting ==
In a dystopian near-future Los Angeles, residents live under a regime of military occupation by an organization known as the Transitional Authority. The Authority serves an extraterrestrial group referred to as the "Hosts", about whom little is known until later in the series (an alien robotic race that finds itself hunted came to Earth to use humans as allies and labor in their own battle). The symbol of the collaborating forces features stylized birds of prey, or raptors, which gives rise to their nickname, the "Raps". The Authority enforces Host policy via militarized police called Homeland Security and nicknamed the "Redhats" for the red helmet cover of their otherwise black tactical attire.

The Hosts took control on a day known simply as the "Arrival". That day began with a permanent global blackout and mass technological failure (which is why nearly all electronic equipment was replaced with host-provided tech after the arrival), which came after a weeklong hunt for relevant key figures around the world. Late that day, massive rectangular blocks descended from the sky, linking together to build walls dividing every city and every nation. One of these walls, 20 to 30 stories tall, many meters thick and many miles in length, surrounds the central part of Los Angeles, where the series is set. Other similar walls have been constructed around neighbouring urban areas, called "blocs", with the whole referred to as a "colony". Traffic passes through the walls at heavily secured checkpoints, called "gateways", which allow the Authority to strictly control the movement of people and the distribution of consumables, such as food and fuel, which are rationed. The geographical extent of the alien invasion is unclear, but later scenes in the series show Authority members from all over the world - hence making the invasion scale worldwide.

A privileged class of elites, drawn by the Hosts from the local population, are denigrated by some bloc residents as collaborators. The ruling forces maintain control through the separation of family members, shoot-on-sight curfews, forced disappearances, random checkpoints, frequent electronic identity checks, limitation of motor vehicle usage (most people walk or ride bicycles), pervasive visual propaganda, slave labor in a place called the "Factory" (later revealed to be located on the Earth's moon to mine radioactive materials), and massive continuous electronic surveillance with both hidden cameras as well as Host-provided drone aircraft that launch from hangar bays inside the wall and are capable of killing humans by extremely lethal high energy weaponry. All chronic medical problems, such as diabetes, have been "deemed unworthy for treatment" by the Hosts to cull the population and eradicate weakness (as strong humans are needed for off-world labor and the Hosts' war effort).

A resistance movement is referred to as both the "Resistance" and the "Insurgency". An informal barter-based black market has also sprung up, trading in surplus materials and home-produced goods.

=== Allusion to historical events ===
In a May 21, 2015, interview with Collider, executive producer Carlton Cuse stated that the show was "conceived as a metaphor for France during the Nazi occupation". In a separate interview with Entertainment Weekly, co-creator Ryan Condal detailed that the original concept behind Colony was that they "were actually inspired by Nazi-occupied Paris during WWII, where people went on living their lives, having coffee in street-side cafes while Nazi officers marched along the roads".

== Plot ==
The series begins less than a year after the arrival of aliens who occupy Earth. It follows the Bowmans and their extended family in Los Angeles. Their son, Charlie, was on a school sports trip and was separated from them when alien walls sectioned off part of the city. The father, Will Bowman, is a former FBI agent and retired Army Ranger who reluctantly joins the Redhats (humans collaborating with the aliens) and is tasked with tracking down members of the Resistance, after being threatened that he and his family would be sent to "the Factory" if he did not comply. Unbeknownst to Will, his wife, Katie, is an operative in the Resistance. She later reveals this, and they begin to trade information. Their son, Bram, discovers a way under the wall, and later joins a rival resistance group.

== Cast and characters ==
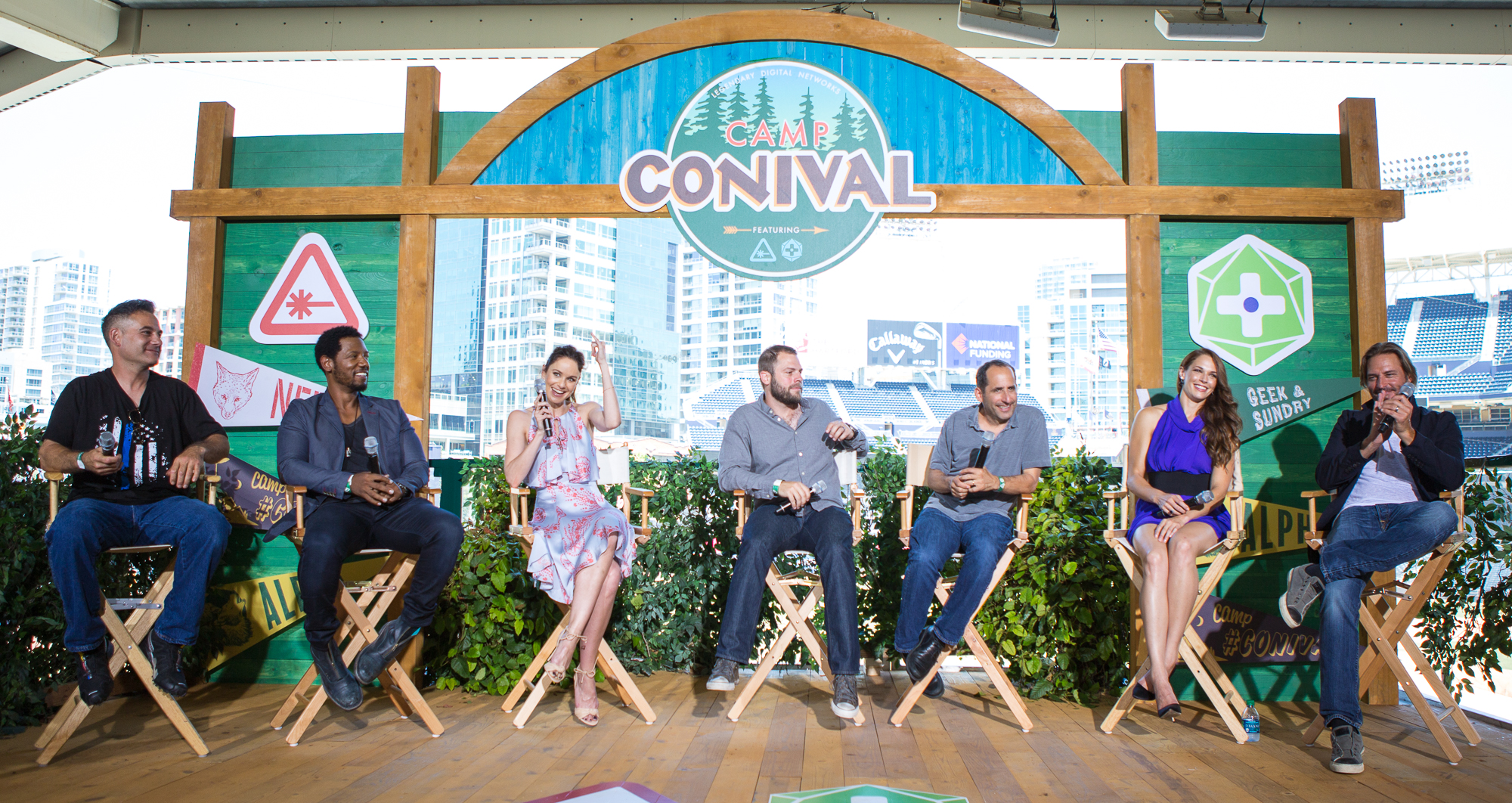
The cast at Camp Conival presentation for Colony offsite at Petco Park during San Diego Comic-Con 2016. From left: Adrian Pasdar, Tory Kittles, Sarah Wayne-Callies, Ryan Condal, Peter Jacobson, Amanda Righetti and Josh Holloway

=== Main ===
- Josh Holloway as Will Bowman: A former U.S. Army Ranger and FBI special agent initially working under the alias Billy "Sully" Sullivan as a truck driver and mechanic. To protect his family from being sent to the Factory, and to find his missing son Charlie, Will starts working for the Redhats hunting down Resistance members.
- Sarah Wayne Callies as Katie Bowman: Will's wife and a secret Resistance operative. She owns and operates "The Yonk", a New Orleans-themed bar.
- Peter Jacobson as Alan Snyder: The Proxy Governor of the Los Angeles Bloc and an unrepentant Collaborator. Snyder claims to be a former Stanford University provost but is later revealed to have been the corrupt purchasing manager of a small community college.
- Amanda Righetti as Madeline "Maddie" Kenner (seasons 1–2): Katie's younger sister
- Tory Kittles as Eric Broussard: A former U.S. Marine Corps Force Recon officer, CIA paramilitary operator and private military contractor. Now a Resistance operative, he infiltrates the Redhats and is Katie's main Resistance contact.
- Alex Neustaedter as Bram Bowman: Will and Katie's teenaged son
- Isabella Crovetti as Grace Kathryn "Gracie" Bowman: Will and Katie's young daughter
- Jacob Buster as Charlie Bowman (guest season 1; season 2–3): Will and Katie's younger son, who was separated from the rest of his family a year before the start of the series, when the wall went up.

=== Recurring ===
- Kim Rhodes as Rachel (season 1): A doctor and Resistance cell member
- Paul Guilfoyle as Alexander Quayle (season 1): A former CIA Berlin station chief and Defense Intelligence Agency officer turned Los Angeles Resistance leader
- Cooper J. Friedman as Hudson (seasons 1–2): Madeline's diabetic son
- Carl Weathers as Bolton "Beau" Miller (season 1): A retired San Francisco Police Department officer and Homeland Security officer and Will Bowman's partner
- Ally Walker as Helena Goldwyn: Chief of staff and later Governor-General of the Los Angeles Colony of which the Bloc is a part
- Kathy Baker as Phyllis (season 1): Will's boss at Homeland Security whom he suspects (and she implies) is a former CIA agent
- Kathleen Rose Perkins as Jennifer McMahon (seasons 1–2): A former online dating service database administrator turned Homeland Security agent, below Phyllis and above Will and Beau
- Gonzalo Menendez as Captain Lagarza (season 1): A Redhat officer
- Erin Way as Lindsey (seasons 1–2): The Proxy government-provided tutor for Gracie Bowman
- Kathryn Morris as Charlotte Burgess (season 1): A cultural director in the green zone who becomes Maddie's boss
- Adrian Pasdar as Nolan Burgess (seasons 1–2): Charlotte's husband and an important player in the politics of the occupational government
- Bethany Joy Lenz as Morgan (season 2): (Note: Guest star Thora Birch played Morgan in season 1) A software engineer and Los Angeles Resistance member
- Charlie Bewley as Eckhart (seasons 1–2): A Resistance cell member
- Victor Rasuk as BB (seasons 1–2): A Resistance cell member
- Carolyn Michelle Smith as Devon (season 2): Will's partner at the FBI before the Arrival
- Mac Brandt as Sgt. Jenkins (season 2): A labor camp guard
- Jessica Parker Kennedy as Maya (season 2): A prisoner at the labor camp who befriends Bram
- Max Arciniega as Edison (season 2): A prisoner at the labor camp and accomplice of Maya
- Christian Clemenson as Dan Bennett (season 2): The new head of Homeland Security
- Toby Huss as Bob Burke (season 2): A scheming former Internal Affairs detective who is assigned as Will Bowman's new partner at Homeland Security
- William Russ as Hennessey (season 2): An ex-spy and friend of Broussard
- Laura Innes as Karen (season 2): The leader of a violent anti-collaboration group in Los Angeles
- Keiko Agena as Betsy (season 2): A co-worker of Will Bowman and Jennifer at Homeland Security
- Meta Golding as Noa (season 2): A member of a Resistance cell from outside the walls
- John Hoogenakker as Scott Garland (season 3): A former FBI agent turned Greyhat lieutenant who is charged with hunting the Resistance in the Pacific Northwest
- Peyton List as Amy Leonard (season 3): A doctor and Resistance dispatcher who works with Broussard but distrusts Will
- Graham McTavish as Andrew MacGregor (season 3): A former conspiracy theorist who now leads a Resistance cell based in the forest
- Waleed Zuaiter as Vincent (season 3): The second-in-command of MacGregor's Resistance cell
- Wayne Brady as Everett Kynes (season 3): Head of the autonomous Seattle colony
- Stephen Lobo as Roy Morrow (season 3): Everett Kynes' long time friend and colleague
- Nicki Micheaux as Michelle (season 3): Katie's superior at her job at the Seattle Refugee Assistance program
- E.J. Bonilla as Harris (season 3): An investigator and bodyguard for Everett Kynes
- David Paetkau as Adam Ford (season 3): An investigator and bodyguard for Everett Kynes
- Will Brittain as Dave O'Neill (season 3): A mysterious acquaintance of Harris and Ford
- Elise Gatien as Meadow (season 3): Bram's new girlfriend in the Seattle colony
- Chris William Martin as Roger (season 3): Everett Kynes' assistant
- Barclay Hope as Sal (season 3): Meadow's father and Bram's superior in the Citizens Safety Patrol

== Episodes ==
Season	Episodes	Originally released	
Season	Episodes	First released	Last released
1	10	January 14, 2016	March 17, 2016
2	13	January 12, 2017	April 6, 2017
3	13	May 2, 2018	July 25, 2018

=== Season 1 (2016) ===
No. overall	No. in season	Title	Directed by	Written by	Original release date	U.S. viewers (millions)
1	1	"Pilot"	Juan José Campanella	Story by : Carlton Cuse & Ryan J. Condal; Teleplay by : Ryan J. Condal	January 14, 2016 (Note: The pilot episode was released online on December 15, 2015.)	1.36
To find his missing son in the neighbouring Santa Monica bloc, Will Bowman attempts to smuggle himself through the wall but is discovered and arrested when the Resistance detonates a bomb at the gateway. Katie seeks insulin for her nephew, Hudson, attempting a deal with the black market, carrying a forbidden weapon, violating curfew, and ultimately stealing insulin from a hospital, any of which carries severe penalties. Will is identified and given offers from LA Governor Snyder—first at a lavish cocktail party and the next morning at the Bowman's home making breakfast—to work for Homeland Security hunting the Resistance. Bowman gives in but demands help finding his son. Katie meets with the leaders of the LA Resistance, offering to spy on Homeland through her husband.
2	2	"A Brave New World"	Juan José Campanella	Wes Tooke	January 21, 2016	1.26
Will and his Homeland Security partner, Beau, arrest a man for the gateway bombing the week before. Katie informs Broussard and Quayle, who is concerned that the bomber's cell could give up vital information. Will's former co-worker, Carlos, has been arrested for the smuggling attempt. Katie and Will shelter his family and get them new identities, but Will can do nothing to prevent Carlos from being sent to the Factory. Katie informs Broussard when Will goes to apprehend the rest of the cell, and Will arrives to find them all executed and concludes that the Resistance has a mole at Homeland. Maddie, while working catering services in the green zone, is invited for a fling by old acquaintance George; however he only wants to see her discreetly which upsets her.
3	3	"98 Seconds"	Juan José Campanella	Daniel C. Connolly	January 28, 2016	1.21
Geronimo, a Resistance mobile radio operator, tells a story of injustice motivating the Santa Monica gateway bombing, urging people to resist. Katie takes part in the hijacking of a supply truck, in which civilian and Resistance lives are sacrificed to determine drone response times. Will and Beau investigate, identify the Resistance member and find a cipher in his home, leading to his entire family being sent to the Factory. Both Will and Katie have doubts about their work. Bram and schoolteacher Mr. Carson have been recording the Geronimo broadcasts and studying the Hosts' spacecraft launches. Fellow student Pia leads Bram to a secret way under the Wall, where she says there are supplies but no people. Will and Beau discover the LA Resistance's underground armory and shooting range, costing the operation half of its weapons, and Katie is urged to deliver intelligence worth what Will is costing them. She tells them about The Rolodex, a Rap database with information on all citizens.
4	4	"Blind Spot"	Nelson McCormick	Anna Fishko & Dre Alvarez	February 4, 2016	1.15
Broussard is shown to have infiltrated a Homeland Security team. The Bowmans' home is hit with a small firebomb so Katie can surveil the post office (the LA Homeland Security HQ) while being questioned. Maddie gets a work assignment with Charlotte Burgess and offers to help locate prominent artwork in exchange for insulin. Bram's pirate radio tapes are confiscated, but Will's boss, Phyllis, destroys them to protect Will's family. Will is able to find and capture the pirate broadcaster, Luis Ortega, but discovers he is reading scripts delivered from the green zone. Phyllis reveals a picture of Katie at the truck ambush, coercing Katie into working for her. However, when Phyllis returns home, Broussard is waiting to execute Phyllis and her bedridden husband.
5	5	"Geronimo"	Scott Peters	Carlton Cuse	February 11, 2016	1.07
Will and Beau follow a lead on the Geronimo posters to a home in the green zone with a concealed print shop, capturing an advertising executive who invented the folk hero but has no connection to the Insurgency. However, Snyder makes an announcement that Geronimo was captured and puts Ortega on a week-long televised show-trial, after which he is publicly hanged. Jennifer suggests Katie could be the leak, leading Will to search their home and the Yonk. Bram ventures outside the wall with Pia and helps her loot a warehouse. Quayle has his people, including Katie, gear-up for a big operation, while Snyder pulls Will into his SUV as his motorcade leaves the courthouse.
6	6	"Yoknapatawpha"	Nelson McCormick	Ryan J. Condal	February 18, 2016	0.95
The LA Colony administration plots against Snyder, waiting for a mistake to undermine his appointment. In the lead vehicle of Snyder's motorcade, Broussard kills his team, halting the convoy at an Insurgent ambush. Will holds them off and retreats; the Insurgents abort as drones approach. However, Snyder refuses to radio for help, fearing a coup or infiltration by the Insurgents, so they shelter at The Yonk. Katie quietly informs the Insurgents and Quayle orders lethal force against Will. Katie kills a member of her cell to protect Will and has a brief standoff with Broussard, who leaves as Snyder appears to have fled. However, Will lied about Snyder's hiding spot and he emerges when Homeland Security arrives. Will informs Katie that folk hero Geronimo does not exist but was used by fanatics for violence. Broussard sends the surviving members of the cell into hiding. Quayle concludes that Katie is a double-agent.
7	7	"Broussard"	Roxann Dawson	Sal Calleros	February 25, 2016	1.00
Will and Beau hunt for Broussard, who tries to fake his own death. Katie meets a conflicted Broussard and realizes she has been disavowed. To keep Broussard on her side, she tips Will to his location then tips Broussard so he can escape. However, Will notices a paperback used for a book code and realizes Katie is connected to Broussard. Lindsey is shown to be a youth leader for a religious sect anticipating The Greatest Day, seeing the Hosts as the Second Coming, and secretly begins indoctrinating Gracie. Maddie involves herself in a love triangle with Charlotte and Nolan Burgess, but Nolan becomes more demanding and Charlotte asserts dominance by threatening to stop providing insulin.
8	8	"In from the Cold"	Tim Southam	Wes Tooke	March 3, 2016	0.97
Quayle contacts Will and offers to give up Broussard and the rest of his cell for a travel pass and supplies to leave the colony. Will takes the deal to Snyder but also informs Katie, hoping the Insurgents will turn on each other. A man named Eckhart approaches Broussard for tactical support. Quayle tries to hand over his cell at a meet with Eckhart, letting Homeland Security ambush them all in an open food market, but Katie spots troops on a rooftop and sounds an alarm. Broussard and Eckhart are able to flee, but Rachel is killed along with a number of civilians. Will kills Quayle in a safehouse, blaming it on Broussard. Also, Bram and Mr. Carson use a makeshift telescope to view a Host facility on the moon; it is the factory.
9	9	"Zero Day"	Roxann Dawson	Ryan J. Condal	March 10, 2016	1.09
On the anniversary of the Arrival, violence breaks out between Homeland Security and many mourners, protestors, and looters breaking curfew. Will and Beau convince Snyder that insurgents are being delivered supplies from outside the colony and, from the top floor of a downtown skyscraper, look over the wall to try and plan their escape. Broussard brings Katie to meet with Eckhart's cell, who need tactical support abducting a regional VIP they believe is coming into the colony by subway. Snyder's people discover the utility tunnel under the wall and Will realizes it is the perfect way out, urging Katie to leave with Beau and their children while he gets Charlie. He confides knowing that she has been spying on him for hardened killers, but she chooses the cause over her family. Will invites Beau to escape while he can. Katie and the Insurgents blow up the train and discover the VIP is in a high-tech full-body suit with four-digit gloves. Also, Maddie offers Charlotte a private art collection, allowing Charlotte to be caught with the unlogged artwork in a Homeland Security raid. Nolan provides Snyder with the administration's plans for the bloc.
10	10	"Gateway"	Nelson McCormick	Carlton Cuse & Ryan J. Condal & Wes Tooke	March 17, 2016	1.19
In Santa Monica, Charlie and other street urchins violently rob a homeless man. Homeland Security is mobilized to find the Host attacked in their bloc, which stands to be destroyed in retaliation. The Host is taken to Eckhart's hideout where the technologists try to learn from it, even while the bloc is attacked from above. Maddie takes the children to the green zone and safety at the Burgess home, but Bram sneaks away and brings Mr. Carson to the tunnel. Jennifer identifies Eckhart and gives Will a head-start to save Katie. He warns them that Homeland is coming and Broussard allows them five minutes to learn what they can, but Katie removes shielding so a signal from the Host's suit gets out, forcing them to flee as drones descend. Snyder tries to make a deal with Nolan to save the bloc and get himself a modest job in the Transitional Authority. The Host is carried out in a shroud and Snyder gives Will the transit pass his daughter refused, urging him to use it quickly. As Will heads into Santa Monica, Snyder is detained by Lagarza, Bram and Carson are captured under the wall, and Katie returns to an empty house.

=== Season 2 (2017) ===
No. overall	No. in season	Title	Directed by	Written by	Original release date	U.S. viewers (millions)
11	1	"Eleven.Thirteen"	Juan José Campanella	Ryan J. Condal	January 12, 2017	0.93
Just before the Arrival, Will was working at the FBI. He suspects his teammate, Devon, of receiving bribes and plans to request a transfer. All the agents are urgently called to find VIPs who have disappeared. Snyder is in charge of purchasing at a community college; two mysterious men, who know he has been embezzling, come to offer him a prestigious position. Broussard has just returned from overseas. He receives a summons to join other "operatives" with all his equipment. An electromagnetic pulse then causes a transport, communications, and power failure throughout the city. Broussard finds it suspicious to gather all the best fighters under the same roof and leaves moments before the building is leveled by an unknown weapon. Will shelters his family in the Yonk and goes by bicycle to find Charlie in Santa Monica. Before he gets there, the wall descends, separating the blocs.
12	2	"Somewhere Out There"	Juan José Campanella	Wes Tooke	January 19, 2017	0.88
Bram is being transferred outside the bloc. Katie requests help from Maddie, who asks Nolan to intervene. The teenager is sent to a labor camp run by Snyder. Katie confronts Nolan for Bram's release, earning Maddie's fury. Maddie undergoes her integration ceremony into the colony's elite. Dan Bennett, the new head of the bloc's Homeland Security Department, has doubts about Jennifer's loyalty and demands results. Jennifer threatens to reveal Katie's involvement in the Resistance if she does not turn over Broussard. In the Santa Monica bloc, where warlords rule outside the green zone, Will and Devon find Charlie in a gang of street children run by Solomon. Will trades a woman's freedom and his transit pass for Charlie but, when he understands what Charlie has suffered, he goes back and kills Solomon with his bare hands.
13	3	"Sublimation"	Juan José Campanella	Thomas Brady	January 26, 2017	0.78
Will and Devon hire a smuggler to get them to the Los Angeles bloc by climbing over in the hills. During the ascent, a drone spots them and eliminates Devon and two other men but spares Will, who shields Charlie. Katie worries about Rap proselytism having an effect on her daughter. She goes to an interreligious discussion group and then shows Gracie how the Greatest Day parrots established beliefs. Jennifer puts pressure on Katie, who reveals the bug at Homeland Security, but it is not enough for the new director.
14	4	"Panopticon"	Juan José Campanella	Ryan J. Condal & Wes Tooke	February 2, 2017	0.82
Recently named Governor General, Helena Goldwyn pleads the cause of the Los Angeles colony to the Global Authority. A vote for total rendition fails and she promises total surveillance. Will, who returns with Charlie, collapses when he learns that Bram has been arrested. Will and Katie speak of their exploits and struggles while Jennifer watches on hidden cameras, giving her everything she needs to save herself. She instead protects them, gets demoted for her incompetency at work, and deletes the surveillance records. Charlie takes a dislike to Lindsey and discreetly sets fire to her religious text. Will notices the smoke detectors did not work and tells Katie he suspects the house is under surveillance. In her own home, Jennifer watches a secret cellphone video while having a glass of wine with a bottle of pills.
15	5	"Company Man"	Tim Southam	Liz Phang	February 9, 2017	0.89
Broussard and his cell immobilize a drone long enough to attach a camera. They discover that the wall houses a hangar for thousands of drones and record sounds that could be their communications. Will returns to Homeland where he is collected in the lobby and taken to his new boss, Dan Bennett, chief of special police, who is suspicious of Will's activities. He is given a new partner, Burke, who frames Broussard for a Red Hand attack to turn the public against him. Will searches for Jennifer who seems to have disappeared. Bram becomes a double agent, reporting to Snyder only what Maya wants him to know, which leads to the deaths of innocents. Katie throws Lindsey out of her home for disciplining Charlie, then visits Maddie for help, taking the opportunity to steal a file from Nolan's computer.
16	6	"Fallout"	Thomas Carter	Lee Patterson	February 16, 2017	0.76
Katie and Will realize the file containing information about Bram can only be accessed from an Authority computer. Will pressures Betsy for help which results in her reassignment. Morgan turns to Katie for assistance when Butch falls ill during Broussard's absence. Will coerces Dr. Weisman to examine the man, who exhibits signs of terminal radiation sickness from exposure to the gauntlet, the alien artefact of unknown significance captured by the resistance. Eckhart slips out of the bunker and sees missing-persons posters for his mother. Nolan and Maddie visit the labor camp, where Nolan demands to see a shipment going off-planet: person-sized pods. Bram is brought baked goods by a well-meaning but clueless Maddie, and later sees the cell making a suitcase bomb.
17	7	"Free Radicals"	Tim Southam	Noah Evslin	February 23, 2017	0.76
Frankie seduces young men and recruits them for Red Hand suicide missions. Will and Burke capture her cell, but Burke executes the others and tortures Frankie to gain information; when Will intervenes, she commits suicide. Katie asks Broussard to access the file and the technologists find it contains census data which shows a trend of collapsing populations, with LA vacant in 830 days. This coincides with a countdown discovered in the drone communications. Bram should be released in six months. Maya has sex with Bram before asking him to steal Snyder's keycard and inform Snyder of an escape attempt. They use this as a diversion to reach the secure cargo, where pods are holding humans in stasis. They open one pod, killing the occupant to make room for the bomb. Jenkins finds them and overpowers Bram but is killed by another cell member. The ship lifts off and explodes during ascent, creating an explosion visible across the colony. Bram learns afterwards that Maya was on the ship to manually detonate the bomb.
18	8	"Good Intentions"	Juan José Campanella	Liz Phang	March 2, 2017	0.78
There is a manhunt for Emmet Halstead, spotted escaping the raid on the Red Hand. Will let him go, so Broussard and Katie race to find him first, but he panics and is swept into custody. Emmet does not mention Will but identifies the leader of the Red Hand as Frankie's mother, Karen, who Will encountered earlier. That night, the Red Hand attack the Bowman home in revenge, killing Lindsey, though the family survives. Broussard decides to give the gauntlet to Hennessey, against the wishes of his team. Eckhart tells Morgan of an offer for their safety if they hand over the gauntlet and Broussard. However, Morgan betrays Eckhart, who is executed by Broussard. Snyder races to destroy evidence that could link the explosion to his facility. He makes Bram name the other three members of the cell, though Bram recants as they undergo execution. Snyder does this in hopes of saving the facility but, in the end, the entire facility is leveled by airstrike with only Snyder and Bram escaping. Snyder reunites Bram with his family.
19	9	"Tamam Shud"	Jeremy Webb	Wes Tooke	March 9, 2017	0.77
Two Resistance members parachute into the bloc. One dies on landing with an encrypted radio, which Will sabotages. Katie and Broussard go to contact Hennessey but find him dead, his home burgled for the gauntlet. Burke investigates Katie and links her to Broussard. The Bowman children are held at the safehouse apartment and Will is apprehended and threatened. He offers to deliver the pilot, drawing her out to a public meet. Broussard and Katie attack the safehouse and recover the children. When Burke realizes he has no leverage on Will, he tries to abort the operation, but Will stabs him with a bottle and runs. The pilot, who spotted the trap, comes to Will's rescue and they escape together. Broussard takes the family to his bunker then meets with the pilot, Noa, who came for the gauntlet.
20	10	"The Garden of Beasts"	Olatunde Osunsanmi	Julia Cooperman	March 16, 2017	0.78
Katie asks Maddie to flee the sector with her. Maddie rejects this and blames Katie for her and Nolan's problems, which soon include an interrogation by the Global Authority Intelligence Directorate. While Noa goes to contact the Red Hand for the gauntlet, the others look for a way through the wall. Broussard threatens a gateway shift supervisor who is only aware of one exemption to inspections: the Blackjacks, men-in-black who work for the Global Authority. To get a vehicle, they give themselves up as bait and wait for Maddie to sell them out. They succeed in getting a vehicle, but it is laser-targeted for a drone strike and they barely escape. Within the vehicle, Broussard saw a pod with Will's biometrics and feels they should lie low. Bram sneaks out and contacts the Red Hand, meeting Karen. Snyder asks Bennett to inform for him.
21	11	"Lost Boy"	Charlotte Brändström	Lee Patterson & Thomas Brady	March 23, 2017	0.80
A Red Hand massacre in the green zone, killing the families of collaborators, is observed in short acts by the main characters. Bram and a young man called Patrick infiltrate as gardeners and break into a mansion, where Patrick is shot dead. Maddie hears gunfire and finds Bram at her door, saying they should leave the green zone; she drives him through the carnage and talks them through the checkpoint, though she realizes what Bram did and furiously sends him away. Snyder meets with a GA ambassador, campaigning for the colony, and leaves as Bram goes in. Snyder sends his detail away for a one-hour meeting; as the gunfire starts, he flees into a ravine where he stays until the Redhats find him. Katie is at the bunker when Bram returns and tries to console him. Will arrives, livid about the massacre. Bram tells his parents that he was part of blowing up the Rap ship and that the labour camp was destroyed as a result. Although Bram claims to have not killed anyone, it is shown that he murdered the ambassador in cold blood.
22	12	"Seppuku"	Peter Leto	Wes Tooke	March 30, 2017	0.82
Broussard tries to negotiate, but Karen will not deal with those who work with collaborators. They attack the Red Hand's base to wipe out the dangerous fanatics and recover the gauntlet, but Noa is killed and the others do not know how to find her cell. Broussard deploys the tracker from the gauntlet, calling drones which exterminate the Red Hand fighters but ominously leave him alive. Nolan disavows Maddie, who is arrested. Snyder intervenes for leverage on Nolan, who in turn provides evidence against the ambitious LA proxy. Nolan is sent to the Factory and Goldwyn puts her house in order, with Snyder convinced that the moderates will calm the bloc in the absence of the Red Hand and Greatest Day extremists. However, Goldwyn receives a call from the Global Authority: LA has been scheduled for total rendition.
23	13	"Ronin"	Juan José Campanella	Carlton Cuse & Ryan J. Condal	April 6, 2017	0.82
Orders are given to evacuate the LA bloc to San Fernando, ostensibly as part of the Intelligence Directorate's search for the gauntlet. Snyder learns it is a cover for total rendition: the entire population is being sent to the Factory. Blackjacks follow Will and Katie to Broussard's bunker which is overwhelmed, but the agents try to take Will and Broussard alive and are themselves killed. With no way to get the gauntlet out, Will suggests trading it to Snyder for safe passage. Snyder instead asks to go with them, unsure he can live as a collaborator. They waylay Snyder's security detail but, at the gateway, the shift sergeant is suspicious and is about to search the gauntlet container. Will reveals himself and a standoff ensues, Will telling them the truth about the evacuation, which is confirmed by Snyder. They are let through and see ships descend; Snyder quietly activates an electronic device. Broussard remains in the bloc. Maddie is turned away at the Greatest Day temple she founded and taken to an evacuation center, her fate unclear.

=== Season 3 (2018) ===
No. overall	No. in season	Title	Directed by	Written by	Original release date	U.S. viewers (millions)
24	1	"Maquis"	Tim Southam	Ryan J. Condal & Wes Tooke	May 2, 2018	0.58
The Bowmans and Snyder have been living in a log cabin for six months. A huge unrecognized damaged spaceship flies overhead followed by drones. Will and Snyder go to a lookout point to see the ship. A battle ensues, with drones attacking the ship. Will speculates that the RAPs are at war and the opposing side is a possible ally. Katie and Bram retrieve the hidden gauntlet. Will and Snyder encounter a group of Greyhats readying to attack the cabin. Snyder runs to the cabin to warn the family and leads the two younger kids away. At the rendezvous point, Snyder says he is going back to help Will and Katie but meets with the leader of the Greyhats. Snyder is told to only activate his beacon when he has located the Resistance. Will and Katie encounter a drone, which leaves without attacking them. They peer inside a damaged escape pod from the spaceship, spying the remains of an unknown lifeform. When Snyder returns, Will is suspicious. Bram makes contact with a woman on the radio. Bram says who they are and that they have the gauntlet. She gives them a location and time to meet.
25	2	"Puzzle Man"	Tim Southam	Mike Ostrowski	May 9, 2018	0.44
The Bowmans and Snyder are put on a cargo train by the woman on the radio. They are met by Vincent from the Resistance. On the way to the camp, Vincent tells the Bowmans that the camp can sometimes be political and, upon arrival, they find out Vincent disobeyed orders to meet them. They give the gauntlet to the camp's leader. In LA, Broussard is running an underground railroad to bring LA survivors to the San Fernando bloc. One night after delivering a woman and her son to San Fernando, Broussard is working out of the old police station, piecing together shredded documents left behind by the occupation, when a woman arrives. It turns out she is the dispatcher, Amy, he has been talking to as part of his railroad work. She tells him her team was ambushed. Working together on the document puzzles, they find out that LA is going to be turned into a bioweapon. They decide to leave LA to find the Resistance camp.
26	3	"Sierra Maestra"	Peter Leto	Cathryn Humphris	May 16, 2018	0.70
Broussard and Amy, once a neurologist from the San Fernando bloc, travel outside the wall and encounter travelers. Together, they mount a raid on medical supplies guarded by Walkers, which goes badly. Broussard and Amy travel in the Central Valley and encounter a glowing alien base. They decide to head for the coast, to San Francisco. In the camp, MacGregor demands that the Bowmans reveal all they know, but he is unforthcoming himself. The adults are put to work in different tasks. At night, a powerful noise disturbs the camp, resulting from the gauntlet being re-attached to the captured RAP, a machine. The RAP mimics the Bowmans' speech and starts to answer questions. It claims the RAPs are fleeing an enemy force that promise total annihilation for the human race and that the base being built on the moon with human labor is a defence against the RAPs' enemy.
27	4	"Hospitium"	Peter Leto	Marcus Dalzine	May 23, 2018	0.70
28	5	"End of the Road"	Jeremy Webb	Wes Tooke	May 30, 2018	0.69
29	6	"The Emerald City"	Sarah Boyd	Ryan J. Condal	June 6, 2018	0.72
30	7	"A Clean, Well-Lighted Place"	Karen Gaviola	Lee Patterson	June 13, 2018	0.79
There has been a jump forward in time. The family has been accepted into Seattle as refugees under the name Dalton, although the authorities know they are the Bowman family. Will is working as a taxi driver while moonlighting as a private investigator. Kate is working as an advocate for refugees coming to Seattle and wants to have a life there. Will does not, because he knows that, beneath their apparently normal life, Seattle is just another colony, albeit with fewer restrictions. Their marriage is under strain, and their children think a divorce is highly possible. Bram is trying to find other accommodation because he wants to move out and have a base to protect Grace if that happens. At the end of the episode, Broussard turns up in Will's cab, wanting to compare notes.
31	8	"Lazarus"	Deran Sarafian	Julia Cooperman	June 20, 2018	0.73
Snyder comes to Seattle on behalf of the IGA to see how and why Kynes is running the city so well. He is spotted by Will, who breaks off an operation with Broussard in order to follow him. Will intends to kill Snyder and enlists Bram to help him. Snyder is separated from his security guards, isolated, and brutally interrogated. However, he knows Will is a decent man and he manages to play on this to avoid being executed. When Snyder is released, he pretends that nothing untoward has occurred because he dares not show any weakness to Kynes.
32	9	"The Big Empty"	Sarah Wayne Callies	Carlos Rios	June 27, 2018	0.70
33	10	"Sea Spray"	Lin Oeding	Mike Ostrowski	July 4, 2018	0.76
34	11	"Disposable Heroes"	Tim Southam	Cathryn Humphris	July 11, 2018	0.66
35	12	"Bonzo"	Charlotte Brändström	Ryan J. Condal	July 18, 2018	0.60
36	13	"What Goes Around"	Tim Southam	Wes Tooke	July 25, 2018	0.59
The Hosts' alien enemies attack Earth and wipe out all the IGA personnel in Davos, including Helena Goldwyn. In Seattle, Will is captured and brought to Proxy Snyder, who tells him that the Hosts are demanding Seattle fulfils its quota of 150 Outliers to go on the front line in space, otherwise the Hosts will not defend Seattle. Will is uncooperative but is released anyway to pass on the message to the Resistance. Will and Kate are still estranged, but their last conversation is amicable. In the absence of Kynes, Broussard takes charge of the Outliers he has gathered. Will is the first volunteer to join the 150. Kynes regains consciousness and gives the location of a fortified facility with huge supplies of weapons and food. All the other Outliers in Seattle gather there to prepare for a siege. Kate tries to find out from Bram where he and Grace are now living, but he refuses to tell her and even makes a veiled threat against her. Will and the others are sealed into pods to go into space and, their sacrifice paid, as the Seattle shield projected from the wall holds against the alien bombardment, a second strike lands outside the wall as Kate watches the approaching shockwave.

=== Specials ===
No.	Title	Directed by	Written by	Original release date	US viewers (millions)
1	"Behind the Wall"	Tim Gray	Ted Averi and Tim Gray	December 21, 2015	0.86

== Future plotlines ==
Carlton Cuse, co-creator of Colony, had originally envisioned the series spanning five to six seasons. The show, however, was canceled after its third season, leaving many storylines unresolved, including a large-scale conflict between humans and the alien occupiers. Josh Holloway, who played the lead character Will Bowman, revealed that the creators had planned a dramatic transformation for his character: he would be sent into space and undergo significant changes – similar to a Jason Bourne-type evolution – before returning to Earth to play a pivotal role in the resistance. The long-term narrative aimed to offer a path to redemption for humanity, involving a reversal of power and a potential "reset" of the world.

In 2025, Holloway said:

I love that show. We were about to do the big war, finally. I was looking forward to coming back and being the super soldier, kicking ass. The way it ended was heartbreaking. But that's our biz. But there is a [fan] following because it was so well-written—it was like a real espionage kind of show. But I told them, "You got to show an alien soon." There's a reason there's a shot clock in the NBA. People are impatient. Show an alien so we don't get canceled! But we were a little late.

== Reception ==
=== Critical response ===
The show has received generally positive reviews. On Metacritic it holds a score of 69/100, based on 22 reviews, indicating "generally favorable reviews". On Rotten Tomatoes, it holds a score of 84%, based on 31 reviews. The critics' consensus reads: "Colony offers an engaging enough narrative, a few scares, and an overall good time, even if none of it is particularly original".

Stephen King praised the series, saying: "In a year of remarkable TV, Colony is really something special: smart, suspenseful, subversive... thought-provoking".

=== Awards and nominations ===
Year	Award	Category	Nominee(s)	Result
2016	Directors Guild of Canada Awards	Best Sound Editing – Television Series	Elma Bellow, John Loranger, Joe Mancuso, Jill Purdy, John Sexton, Adam Stein, Craig MacLellan	Nominated
2016	Saturn Awards	Best Science Fiction Television Series	Colony	Nominated
2017	Saturn Awards	Best Science Fiction Television Series	Colony	Nominated
2018	Saturn Awards	Best Science Fiction Television Series	Colony	Nominated
