= Bojoura =

Dutch vocalist (15 April 1947)

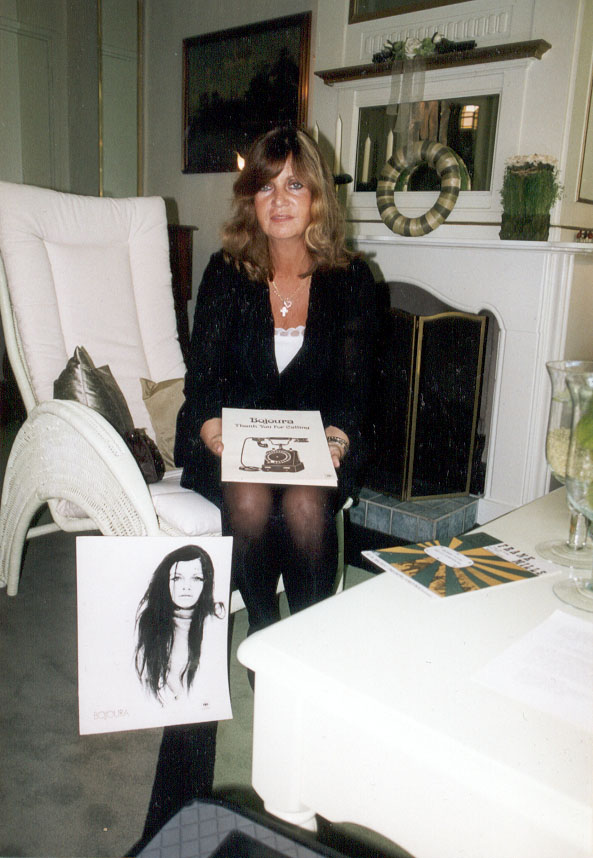

Bojoura, born Raina Gerardina Bojoura van Melzen (15 April 1947), is a folk and pop vocalist, whose greatest success came in the late 1960s and 1970s.

== Life and career ==
Bojoura was born in The Hague, The Netherlands to Bulgarian opera singer Dany Zonewa. Bojoura was discovered by George Kooymans of the rock band Golden Earring, who went on to write and produce many of her songs. Bojoura scored her first hit in June 1967 with the Kooymans ballad "Everybody's Day" which reached top 20 due to heavy airplay on Radio Veronica. She released her album Night Flight Night Sight in 1968, which was not commercially successful.

In 1969, she charted once more in Europe with her version of the song "Frank Mills" from the Broadway musical Hair. It was through this song that she connected with Thijs van Leer, whose band (which later became the Focus) performed in a Dutch production of the musical. Van Leer wrote songs for Bojoura for her third album, The Beauty of Bojoura. She also had a minor success with the title track of If It's Tuesday, This Must Be Belgium, a song that later inspired the opening lines of the song "Chura Liya Hai Tumne" from the 1973 Indian film Yaadon Ki Baaraat.

Through the mid-1970s she had some success in the Netherlands; in 1974, her cover of "The Letter" reached the top 20 on the Dutch charts. After 1980, she concentrated on her family life and helped run her husband's drumming school. Bojoura was married to the Dutch drummer Hans Cleuver, who died in March 2018. Cleuver was a founding member of the progressive rock band Focus.

== Discography ==
=== Albums ===
- 1967 - Kunst voor Kinderen (for terre des hommes)
- 1968 - Nightflight Nightsight
- 1970 - The Beauty of Bojoura (with Focus)
- 1972 - The Best of Bojoura
- 1973 - Jesus Christ Superstar
- 2001 - Everybody's Day

=== Singles ===
Year	Title	Peak chart positions	
Year	Title	NED Dutch Top 40	NED Top 100
1967	"Dream Man"	34	—
1967	"Everybody's Day"	18	—
1968	"Circus Will Be In Town In Time"	—	—
1969	"Frank Mills"	8	7
1969	"If It's Tuesday, This Must Be Belgium"	35	—
1971	"Black Sheep Child"	—	—
1971	"Everything's Allright"	Tip	—
1971	"Once Upon A Time"	—	—
1972	"Allentown Jail"	Tip	—
1973	"What Is Love"	Tip	—
1974	"Thank You For Calling"	—	—
1974	"The Letter"	16	14
1977	"Another Suitcase in Another Hall"	—	—
1980	"Hard Times"	—	—
"—" denotes releases that did not chart
