= P.S. I Hate You (disambiguation) =

P.S. I Hate You is a 2022 Thai television series.

P.S. I Hate You may also refer to:

- "P.S. I Hate You" (The Simpsons), a 2025 episode of The Simpsons
- "P.S. I Hate You", a song by Simple Plan from the 2016 album Taking One for the Team
- PS I Hate You (Indian TV series), a 2014 Indian television series broadcast on Channel V India

== See also ==
- I Hate You (disambiguation)
