= In Spheres Without Time =

Studio album by Myriads
- Released: November 22, 1999
- Recorded: Mansion Studio, Stavanger, Norway
- Genre: Gothic metal
- Length: 45:13
- Label: Napalm
- Producer: Myriads and Øyvind Grødem

Myriads chronology
In Spheres Without Time (demo) (1998)	In Spheres Without Time (1999)	Introspection (2002)

In Spheres Without Time is the debut album of Norwegian gothic metal band Myriads.

== Track listing ==
1. "Fragments of the Hereafter" - 10:20
2. "The Day of Wrath" - 7:14
3. "Spheres Without Time" - 11:38
4. "Seductive Hate" - 8:26
5. "Dreams of Reality" - 7:35

== Personnel ==
- Mona Undheim Skottene - Lead piano, Keyboard, Vocals
- Rudi Jünger - Drums/Percussion
- Mikael Stokdal - Lead keyboard, Piano, Vocals
- J.P - Guitars
- Alexander Twiss - Guitars, Vocals

=== Additional musicians ===
- Torp - Bass guitar
- Knud Kleppe - Bass guitar
