= Introspection (Myriads album) =

Studio album by Myriads
- Released: 2002
- Recorded: Tico Tico Studio, Kemi, Finland
- Genre: Gothic metal
- Length: 74:05
- Label: Napalm
- Producer: Myriads

Myriads chronology
In Spheres Without Time (1999)	Introspection (2002)

Introspection is the second full-length album by the band Myriads.

== Track listing ==
1. "Enigmatic Colours of the Night" - 9:32
2. "Miserere Mei" - 11:45
3. "Inside" - 5:55
4. "The Sanctum of My Soul" - 6:15
5. "Portal to the Mind" - 14:57
6. "Falling in the Equinox" - 3:57
7. "Flickering Thoughts" - 7:55
8. "Encapsulated" - 9:12
9. "The Ascent" - 4:37
