= Introspection (Thijs van Leer album) =

Studio album by Thijs van Leer
- Released: 1972
- Genre: Classical
- Label: CBS

Professional ratings
Review scores
Source	Rating
Allmusic	2/5 stars

Introspection is the debut solo album by classical and progressive rock musician Thijs van Leer, released in 1972.

== Track listing ==
Side one

1. "Pavane" (Op. 50) (Gabriel Fauré) 5:46
2. "Rondo" (Rogier van Otterloo) 3:02
3. "Agnus Dei" (from Mass in B minor) (Johann Sebastian Bach) 4:57
4. "Focus I" (Thijs van Leer) 4:05

Side two

1. "Erbarme Dich" (from St. Matthew Passion) (Bach) 7:22
2. "Focus II" (Van Leer) 4:18
3. "Introspection" (Van Otterloo) 5:25

== Personnel ==
- Letty DeJong – vocals
- Thijs Van Leer – flute
- Rogier Van Otterloo – arrangements, conductor

== Sales ==
Sales for Introspection
Region	Sales
Netherlands	450,000
