= Whitney White (YouTuber) =

American internet personality

- Born: December 23, 1985 (age 40); Rhode Island, U.S.
- Occupation: Vlogger

YouTube information
- Channel: Naptural85
- Years active: 2009–present
- Genre: Hair care
- Subscribers: 1.4 million
- Views: 145 million
- Last updated: October 21, 2025
- Website: naptural85.com

Whitney White (born December 23, 1985), known as Naptural85 on YouTube, is an American vlogger, blogger, natural hair enthusiast, and entrepreneur. She started sharing her story from her first video “Natural Hair Journey”, which showed her hair transition from relaxed to natural hair.

== Biography ==
Whitney White was a studio art major in college with a concentration in Graphic design.

Although initially posting videos on YouTube was just a way to help others and relieve stress, White's YouTube channel “Naptural85” now has over 900k subscribers. Her story continues to inspire women with the same or similar hair type. She also shares her lifestyle with her followers via second and third YouTube channels, DearNaptural85 and WhitneyWhite.

Best known as Naptural85 on YouTube, White is also a source of information regarding current issues facing the natural hair community. She has worked with major brands like Carol's Daughter and has become a force in the black hair industry.

The Naptural85 brand is known for natural haircare including how-to styles, DIY treatments, and industry knowledge. In August 2015, White was referred to as the Michelle Phan of the “natural hair movement” by Alana Yzola of Business Insider. Her work has been noticed by public figures including Dominique Dawes and Kelly Rowland. Her natural hairstyles and hair routines have provided information to those who are struggling with their naturally curly hair.

== Melanin Haircare ==
In October 2018, White and her sister Taffeta White launched Melanin Haircare, a hair care company selling natural products, which are evaluated against the Environmental Working Group criteria.

== Awards ==
- BFab best hair blogger 2014
- Best natural hair blog 2015

== See also ==
- Natural hair movement
- Melanin
