= Pointless Relationship =

2004 single by Tammin Sursok

Single by Tammin

from the album Whatever Will Be
- B-side: "Tender"
- Released: 15 November 2004
- Studio: A Side Productions; Polar (Stockholm, Sweden)
- Length: 3:26
- Label: Columbia; Random
- Songwriters: Savan Kotecha; Per Magnusson; David Kreuger; Marion Raven
- Producers: Per Mangusson; David Kreuger

Tammin singles chronology
"Pointless Relationship" (2004)	"Whatever Will Be" (2005)

"Pointless Relationship" is a song by Australian actress Tammin from her first album, Whatever Will Be (2005). The song was co-written by Norwegian singer Marion Raven for her debut solo album but was given to Tammin instead. Released as Tammin's debut single on 15 November 2004, "Pointless Relationship" peaked at number five on the Australian ARIA Singles Chart, becoming her highest-charting single.

== Commercial performance ==
"Pointless Relationship" debuted at number seven on Australia's ARIA Singles Chart and peaked at number five the following week, spending a total of 15 weeks in the top 50. It was certified platinum for shipping over 70,000 units in Australia.

== Credits and personnel ==
Credits are lifted from the Whatever Will Be liner notes.

Studios

- Recorded at A Side Productions and Polar Studios (Stockholm, Sweden)
- Mixed at Khabang Studio (Stockholm, Sweden)
- Mastered at Sterling Sound (New York City)

Personnel

- Savan Kotecha – writing
- Per Magnusson – writing, keyboards, programming, production, arrangement
- David Kreuger – writing, programming, production, arrangement
- Marion Raven – writing
- Emil Heiling – backing vocals
- Esbjörn Öhrwall – guitars
- Tomas Lindberg – bass
- Magnus Persson – drums
- Fredrik Andersson – mixing, engineering
- Chris Gehringer – mastering

== Charts ==
=== Weekly charts ===
Chart (2005)	Peak position
Australia (ARIA)	5

=== Year-end charts ===
Chart (2005)	Position
Australia (ARIA)	85

== Certifications ==
Region	Certification	Certified units/sales
Australia (ARIA)	Platinum	70,000^{^}
^{^} Shipments figures based on certification alone.
