= RA (album) =

Studio album by Simon Curtis
- Released: June 7, 2011
- Recorded: 2010–2011
- Genre: Electronica, dance-pop, dubstep, synthpop, dark pop
- Length: 44:54
- Label: BoyRobot Records (independent release)
- Producer: Jeff "Jadion" Wells

Simon Curtis chronology
8Bit Heart (2010)	RA (2011)	WWW (2013)

Singles from RA
- 1. "Superhero" Released: May 16, 2011; 2. "Flesh" Released: May 31, 2011

RA (stylized as R∆) is the second studio album by American singer-songwriter and record producer Simon Curtis. It was released independently on June 7, 2011. The album peaked at number 20 on the Billboard Dance/Electronic Albums chart.

== Background and composition ==
Curtis described RA as a "diary of where my mind has been during the past year of my life, dealing with deep betrayal, heartache, sex and the exploration of what lengths someone will go to to achieve his destiny" and said 8-Bit Heart was "a plea for love" and that RA "doesn't want anything to do with it."

== Critical reception ==
Sam Lansky of MuuMuse noted the influence of Britney Spears as well as Darren Hayes on the album and said that while Curtis "knows that creating music that makes us want to dance is imperative" he, "like Darren, ... writes out of some very private vulnerability, documenting the darkest pieces of himself – the rage and the resentment, the envy and the cynicism – in a way that makes the music so much more compelling than it would be if he’d kept it all neatly compartmentalized."

== Track listing ==
Standard edition
No.	Title	Writer(s)	Length
1.	"Laser Guns Up"	Simon Curtis	4:07
2.	"Don't Dance"	Simon Curtis	3:09
3.	"Superhero"	Simon Curtis	3:21
4.	"Pit of Vipers"	Simon Curtis	3:27
5.	"D.T.M."	Simon Curtis	3:17
6.	"Chip in Your Head"	Simon Curtis	2:39
7.	"Flesh"	Simon Curtis	4:20
8.	"How to Start a War"	Simon Curtis	3:48
9.	"Get in Line"	Simon Curtis	3:44
10.	"I Hate U"	Simon Curtis	3:21
11.	"Joshua"	Simon Curtis	3:24
12.	"Soul 4 Sale"	Simon Curtis	3:38
13.	"Enemy"	Simon Curtis	3:05
14.	"The Dark 2: Return to the Dark"	Simon Curtis	2:39

== Charts ==
Chart	Peak position
U.S. Billboard Dance/Electronic Albums	20
