= Simon Curtis (singer) =

American singer-songwriter (born 1986)

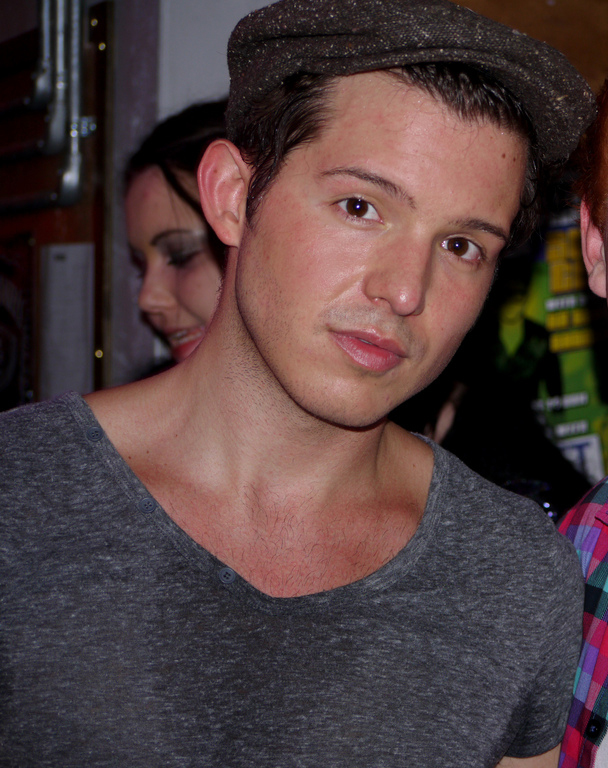
- Curtis in May 2011

Background information
- Born: March 18, 1986 (age 40); Michigan, United States
- Genres: Electronic, dance-pop
- Occupations: Singer-songwriter, actor, record producer, novelist
- Years active: 2006–present
- Website: www.simon-curtis.com

Simon Curtis (born March 18, 1986) is an American singer-songwriter, record producer, and actor. Born in Michigan and raised in Tulsa, Oklahoma, he first gained recognition for his role as Royce Du Lac in the 2009 film Spectacular! before venturing into pop music, during which he released his debut extended play Alter Boy in 2008, his debut full-length studio album, 8Bit Heart in 2010, and in 2011, he released his second studio album (and first commercial release) RA; the two later releases were released through his independent label, BoyRobot Records.

RA debuted at number 20 on Billboard's Dance/Electronic Albums chart.

== Early and personal life ==
Simon Curtis was born in the state of Michigan, United States, and spent his earliest years in Alpena. His family later moved to Tulsa, Oklahoma. At the age of ten, he was diagnosed with leukemia. He graduated from Jenks High School in 2004. Curtis earned a coveted role in the national tour production of the musical Joseph and the Amazing Technicolor Dreamcoat. Curtis is gay.

== Career ==
=== Early career: 2002–2006 ===
Curtis won Popstar Magazine and Johnny Wright's "Get Famous" contest, was named a national top ten finalist in the "Britney Spears Samsung Superstar Tour", was commissioned by Disney to provide a theme song for an annual Disneyland event, was named an official Oklahoma Ambassador of Music, and won the University of Tulsa Award for Outstanding Achievement in Performance.

At 20, Curtis began recording with local record producer Jadion. There they began the sessions that would ultimately result in Curtis' début album Alter Boy EP. Curtis and Jadion were commissioned by Disney to deliver a theme song for the annual Disneyland Resort event, Flashback, which later became a charity single benefiting the Leukemia and Lymphoma Society of America.

=== 2009–2010: Spectacular! and 8Bit Heart ===
In early 2009, Curtis made his film debut starring in the Nickelodeon musical TV film Spectacular!. He landed the role of Royce Du Lac, the lead singer of a show choir, Ta-da and Tammi's boyfriend.

In late 2009, Curtis once again began to work on his musical career. He teamed up with friend producer Jeff "Jadion" Wells and in about thirteen days, he wrote and recorded 8Bit Heart. He chose to release the album for free on his official website after meeting the goal of six thousand followers on his Twitter profile. The album was well received by the pop community and was downloaded over 150,000 times in the two weeks following its release. Curtis did this without a manager or record label. He was the opening act of Backstreet Boys member AJ McLean on May 6, 2010, at the Roxy Theatre in West Hollywood, California.

=== 2011: RA ===
On May 16, 2011, Curtis released the first single from his second album RA (stylized as R∆) titled "Superhero" as well as a remix titled "Superhero (The Remix)" on his independent label BoyRobot Records through the iTunes Store. The second single from the album, titled "Flesh", was released May 31, along with a remix titled "Flesh (Future Freestyle Remix)". On June 7, he released the full-length album and it debuted at number 20 on Billboard's Dance/Electronic Albums chart.

=== 2012–2015: WWW, Wrathschild and Fuse Literary ===
Curtis released a free EP, WWW', on October 12, 2013. It consisted of eight new songs and three alternate covers. Although his sexuality had been questioned beforehand, it was the criticism towards this album's artwork for being "too gay" that led him to defend himself, saying "Love that I'm getting so much heat for my new album artwork being "too gay" on national coming out day." He followed this up with, "With that said, I am gay. *makes dance album, wears midriff-bearing tshirt, puts neon pink leopard font on cover, doesn't care*".

According to an article published on Popjustice on March 20, 2014, Curtis is now part of an electropop duo called Wrathschild which has been working with producer Ray Reich over the past two years. The debut single "Fall Into Love" premiered on Billboard.com on March 24 and became available on iTunes on March 31.

On December 1, 2014, Fuse Literary announced Curtis had joined the company. Curtis later backed this up by stating through his Twitter "suffice it to say, books are coming". He has published two books so far, Boy Robot and its sequel, Robot Army.

=== 2016: New Album 2nd Bit ===
Curtis announced through Twitter on New Year's Eve he would be returning to music with his third studio album. The songs within his new album, titled as "Super 8-bit Heart", are various remixes of songs found in his previous album "8-bit Heart". So far, the remixes haven't been identified by Curtis, or anyone else.

== Discography ==
Simon Curtis discography
- Studio albums: 3
- Extended plays: 3
- Compilation albums: 1
- Singles: 16
- Music videos: 1

=== Studio albums ===
Year	Album
2010	8Bit Heart: First studio album; Released: March 23, 2010; Formats: Digital download
2011	RA: Second studio album; Released: June 7, 2011; Formats: Digital download
2023	Angel Aura: Third studio album; Released: March 3, 2023; Formats: Digital download

=== Extended plays ===
Year	Album
2006	Alter Boy: First extended play; Released: 2006; Formats: Digital download
2013	WWW: Second extended play; Released: October 19, 2013; Formats: Digital download
2015	Love, S: Third extended play; Released: 2015; Formats: Digital download

=== Compilations ===
Year	Album
2016	Super 8-Bit Heart

=== Singles ===
Year	Title	Album
2009	"Delusional"	8Bit Heart
2009	"Diablo"	8Bit Heart
2010	"Boy Robot"	8Bit Heart
2010	"Don't Wanna Be Alone"	8Bit Heart
2010	"Fell in Love W/ An Android"	8Bit Heart
2010	"Super Psycho Love"	8Bit Heart
2010	"8-Bit Heart"	8Bit Heart
2010	"The Neverending Elevator"	8Bit Heart
2010	"Joystick"	8Bit Heart
2010	"Beat Drop"	8Bit Heart
2010	"Brainwash"	8Bit Heart
2010	"The Dark"	8Bit Heart
2010	"Victory"	8Bit Heart
2011	"Laser Guns Up"	R∆
2011	"Don't Dance"	R∆
2011	"Superhero"	R∆
2011	"Pit of Vipers"	R∆
2011	"D.T.M."	R∆
2011	"Chip In Your Head"	R∆
2011	"Flesh"	R∆
2011	"How to Start a War"	R∆
2011	"Get In Line"	R∆
2011	"I Hate U"	R∆
2011	"Joshua"	R∆
2011	"Soul 4 Sale"	R∆
2011	"Enemy"	R∆
2011	"The Dark 2: Return to the Dark"	R∆
2019	"Love"	Angel Aura
2019	"Graduate"	Angel Aura
2022	"Ketamine"	Angel Aura
2022	"I'm Not Sorry"	Angel Aura
2022	"Fairyboy"	Angel Aura

=== Music videos ===
Year	Title	Album
2010	"8Bit Heart": Released: May 10, 2010	8Bit Heart

=== Soundtracks ===
- Spectacular!: Original Television Soundtrack

== Filmography ==
Film
Year	Film	Role	Notes
2009	Spectacular!	Royce Du Lac	Nickelodeon
Television series
Year	Title	Role	Notes
2009	Hannah Montana	Tim	"Once, Twice, Three Times Afraidy"
