= Tammin Sursok =

Australian and American actress (born 1983)

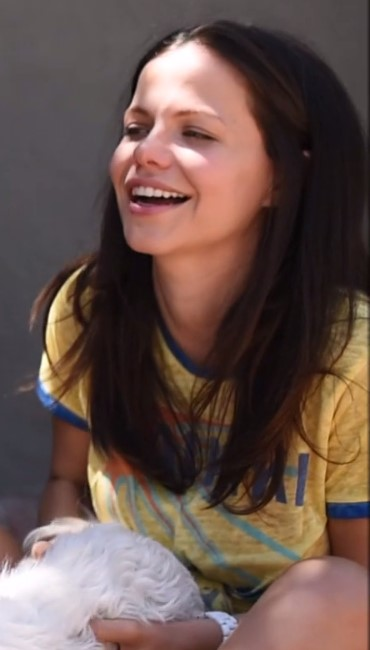
- Sursok in 2017
- Born: 19 August 1983 (age 43); Johannesburg, South Africa
- Occupation: Actress
- Years active: 2000–present
- Spouse: Sean McEwen (m. 2011)
- Children: 2

Tammin Pamela Sursok (born 19 August 1983) is an Australian and American actress. She is best known for her television roles as Dani Sutherland on Home and Away, Colleen Carlton on The Young and the Restless, Jenna Marshall on Pretty Little Liars and Siena on Hannah Montana.

== Early life ==
Sursok was born to musicians Daryl and Julie Sursok in Johannesburg, South Africa. When she was six, her family immigrated to Australia. Early on, Sursok was involved with the Sydney Youth Musical Theatre where she pursued her interests in acting, music, and dance. She also studied at the Trinity Speech and Drama College. Sursok was educated at Ravenswood School for Girls, in Gordon, Sydney, studying speech and drama in her final years of school.

== Career ==
=== 2000–2004: Home and Away ===
In 1999, after completing Year 10, Sursok acquired an agent and landed her first audition for a role in the long-running Australian drama series Home and Away. She was cast in the role of Dani Sutherland, the rebellious eldest daughter of the Sutherland family who took over the running of the Caravan Park. The actress considered herself lucky to get the part, calling the experience "incredible". In an interview with TeenHollywood she stated, "It was my first audition, so I thought it always worked like that, and you always get your first audition, but that is not the case." Sursok's performance in the role earned her a win for the Logie Award for Most Popular New Female Talent beating out Caroline Craig, Madeleine West and Karina Brown. Sursok's performance earned her a nomination for the Logie Award for Most Popular Actress, losing out to McLeod's Daughters star Lisa Chappell.

=== 2004–2006: Whatever Will Be ===
Sursok left Home and Away in 2004 so that she could pursue a music career, and acting opportunities, in the United States. "I'm 21 and it's time to be more creative. It is scary, but I had to leave before I became stale." In 2004, Sursok acknowledged that she was signed to Sony BMG Music Entertainment, confirming reports that recording for her debut studio album had begun.

Sursok's solo album, Whatever Will Be, was released on 22 May 2005, under Sony Music Entertainment with songwriters Savan Kotecha, David Kreuger, Marion Raven, Steve Booker; and producers John Shanks, Per Mangusson and David Kreuger. Whatever Will Be made its debut on the ARIA Albums Chart at number thirteen. During its second week on the charts, it remained at its peak position of #13; however, during its third week, it had a significant drop by 23 spots, landing the album at No. 36. During its fourth week, it fell further landing at No. 43. It ended its run on 20 June, falling completely off the charts and has not charted since. The album's lead single, "Pointless Relationship", debuted on the ARIA Singles Chart at No. 7 before peaking at No. 5, spending 15 weeks on the charts. Upon the song's release, it quickly shot to No. 1 on the Australian Top 100 Radio Airplay Chart, becoming the highest charting debut single in years. "Pointless Relationship" certified Platinum in Australia. The second single, "Whatever Will Be", debuted at No. 13 on the ARIA Singles Chart and spent a total of 18 weeks on the charts. "Whatever Will Be" was the 98th best-selling single of 2005 in Australia. The third and final single off Whatever Will Be, "It's a Beautiful Thing", quickly debuted on the ARIA Singles chart at No. 30. The song peaked at No. 6, spending 12 weeks on the charts. "It's a Beautiful Thing" became the second most downloaded song in its debut week, after Rob Thomas's "This Is How a Heart Breaks". It also peaked at No. 49 on the Australian Top 100 Radio Airplay Chart, becoming her lowest charting single.

After the success of her album, Whatever Will Be, plans were made to launch Sursok in the UK, but these unexpectedly fell through due to changes at her record label. The title track, "Whatever Will Be", was covered by Vanessa Hudgens for her RIAA-certified debut album, V.

=== 2006–present: Focus on films and television work ===
After her UK plans fell through, Sursok relocated from Australia to Los Angeles in 2006 in order to concentrate on her acting career. That same year, she made her film debut in a bit role in the film Aquamarine. Sursok made a guest appearance in a 2007 episode of Rules of Engagement. She was offered the part after auditioning for the lead female role six times, before being told she was too young for the part.

In 2007, after a successful audition, Sursok became the third actress to portray Colleen Carlton on the American soap opera television series, The Young and the Restless. Her debut was quickly met with criticism from a number of The Young and the Restless viewers. Despite the negativity, she received comparable positive viewer feedback. "The fans have been really great." In preparation for the role, Sursok tried to catch up on Colleen's history. "I watched the last six months of episodes," she said. "My boyfriend used to date a girl who was obsessed with Y&R, so he knew everything about it and brought me up to speed, as well." Sursok earned a Daytime Emmy Award nomination for her portrayal of Colleen the following year. After two years in the role, Sursok departed causing the writers to kill off Colleen. In an interview with Soap Opera Digest in October 2009, Sursok said it was difficult to pursue outside projects and appear on The Young and the Restless as well. Her departure was a mutual decision between Sursok and the showrunners.

In 2009, Sursok starred in the Nickelodeon made-for-television musical film Spectacular! portraying the role of Courtney, the lead singer in a high school choir which is fading in popularity. Sursok recorded over three tracks for the film's soundtrack, which debuted at No. 44 on the US Billboard Hot 100. The film premiered on 16 February 2009, to over 3.7 million viewers. The soundtrack, recorded in 2008, was released on 3 February 2009, with Sursok appearing on seven songs on the album, including two solos. The soundtrack peaked at number 44 on the Billboard 200. Sursok also appears in the 2009 feature films Crossing Over and Albino Farm.

From July 2010 to January 2011, Sursok had a recurring role on the Disney Channel Original Series Hannah Montana as swimwear model Siena. She appeared in eight episodes. In 2010, Sursok was cast in ABC Family's adaptation of the Sara Shepard teen mystery book series, Pretty Little Liars. Sursok was cast as Jenna Marshall, a teenage girl who is left blind after a prank gone wrong. The series premiered in June that same year to over 2.47 million viewers. In June 2013, Sursok announced that she would continue her role as Jenna through her pregnancy.

She played Sarah Corso in the indie film Driving By Braille, directed by Kristina Lloyd and written by Richard H. Moon, released on DVD in May 2013. The story tells of a young woman who relives childhood trauma when she senses her boyfriend is about to propose, and who must sort through the crippling fear and doubt that is holding her back before her past destroys the couple's future.

In 2014, after several reports of Sursok indicating she was returning to music, she released a collaboration with singer Joe Brooks, covering "Say Something" made famous by A Great Big World featuring Christina Aguilera.

In January 2022, Sursok joined the cast of Australian soap opera Neighbours as fashion designer and businesswoman Montana Marcel. Her first appearance was on 13 April 2022.

== Personal life ==
On 24 August 2011, Sursok married her boyfriend, actor, producer, and director Sean McEwen, in Florence, Italy. Sursok signed an exclusive deal with the Australian magazine Woman's Day (Australian magazine)|Woman's Day to publish the couple's wedding photos The couple have two daughters, born in October 2013 and January 2019. Sursok also has three dogs.

On 16 March 2016, Sursok posted a photo of herself as an adolescent on Instagram and revealed that she had been bullied because of her weight. The post was part of her #ThisIsBeautiful hashtag campaign which aims to empower people and change the message around beauty standards. The accompanying post read:

For all of you being bullied out there. This is me. Growing up I was overweight and spent most of my adolescence being bullied because of it. I definitely wasn't the popular girl, but it didn't define me. You can be ANYTHING you want to be in your life. It's your choice which path you take. Don't let other people's words give you your self-worth. You are beautiful. I was beautiful. It just took me a long time to love myself. #thisisbeautiful

In 2019, Sursok became an American citizen; however, during the COVID-19 pandemic, she—along with McEwen and their daughters—returned to Australia after being offered a movie role based in Brisbane in 2021, quarantined, and stated in an interview in March 2022 on The Morning Show that she had "accidentally" moved back to Australia.

== Filmography ==
=== Film ===
Year	Title	Role	Notes
2006	Aquamarine	Marjorie	
2009	Crossing Over	Rosalyn	
2009	Albino Farm	Stacey	
2010	Flicka 2	Carrie McLaughlin	Direct-to-video film
2011	Husk	Natalie	
2011	Driving by Braille	Sarah Corso	Direct-to-video film
2013	10 Rules for Sleeping Around	Kate Oliver	
2014	Cam2Cam	Allie Westbrook	
2019	Braking for Whales	Star Walker	Also writer and producer
2023	Blood, Sweat and Cheer	Renee	Streaming film

=== Television ===
Year	Title	Role	Notes
2000–2004	Home and Away	Dani Sutherland	Regular role (seasons 13–17); 297 episodes
2007	Rules of Engagement	Woman	Episode: "Game On"
2007–2009	The Young and the Restless	Colleen Carlton	Regular role, 165 episodes
2008	In Plain Sight	Nicole	Episode: Pilot
2009	Spectacular!	Courtney	Nickelodeon Original Movie
2010–2011	Hannah Montana	Siena	Recurring role (season 4); 8 episodes
2010–2017	Pretty Little Liars	Jenna Marshall	Recurring role (seasons 1–5, 7)
2012	Airship Dracula	Amelia	Television miniseries
2015	Bound & Babysitting	Maggie	Television film
2016	You May Now Kill the Bride	Audrey	Television film
2016	Girlfriends of Christmas Past	Livvy Beal	Television film
2019	My Killer Client	Christa Bright	Television film
2022-2022	Neighbours	Montana Marcel	Guest role
2022	Love and Penguins	Tilly	Television film
2024	Trivia at St. Nick's	Celeste	Television film
2024	Mommy's Stolen Memories	Mallory	Television film

=== Web ===
Year	Title	Role	Notes
2017-2018	Aussie Girl	Tammin Sursok (Lead)	Web television fictionalized version of herself (7 episodes)

== Discography ==
=== Albums ===
Title	Album details	Peak chart positions
Title	Album details	AUS
Whatever Will Be	Released: 22 May 2005; Label: Sony BMG; Format: CD, digital download	13

=== Soundtrack albums ===
Title	Album details	Peak chart positions
Title	Album details	US
Spectacular!	Released: 3 February 2009; Label: Nick Records; Format: CD, digital download	44

=== Singles ===
List of singles, with selected chart positions, showing year released and album name
Title	Year	Peak chart positions	Certification	Album
Title	Year	AUS	Certification	Album
"Pointless Relationship"	2004	5	ARIA: Gold	Whatever Will Be
"Whatever Will Be"	2005	13		Whatever Will Be
"It's a Beautiful Thing"	2005	30		Whatever Will Be
"Say Something" (with Joe Brooks)	2014	—		Non-album single
"—" denotes releases that did not chart or were not released in that territory.

=== Other appearances ===
List of non-single guest appearances, showing year released, other artist(s) featured, and album name
Title	Year	Other artist(s)	Album
"Eye of the Tiger"	2010	Spectacular! Cast	Music from Cats & Dogs: The Revenge of Kitty Galore

=== Music videos ===
List of music videos, showing year released, other artists featured and directors
Title	Year	Other artist(s)	Director(s)	Ref.
As artist
"Pointless Relationship"	2004	None	Unknown	
"Whatever Will Be"	2005	None	Unknown	
"It's a Beautiful Thing"	2005	None	Unknown	
Guest appearances
"Till My Heart Stops Beating"	2013	Joe Brooks		

== Awards ==
Year	Group	Award	Work	Result	Refs
2001	Logie Award	Most Popular New Female Talent	Home and Away	Won	
2004	Logie Award	Most Popular Actress	Home and Away	Nominated	
2008	Daytime Emmy Award	Outstanding Younger Actress in a Drama Series	The Young and the Restless	Nominated	
2013	New York Film Festival	Best Actress in a Leading Role	10 Rules for Sleeping Around	Nominated	
