= I Hate Myself (for Loving You) =

I Hate Myself (For Loving You)

Studio album by van Leer
- Released: 1987
- Label: Ariola
- Producer: Thijs van Leer

Van Leer chronology
Renaissance	I Hate Myself (For Loving You)	Introspection 92

I Hate Myself (for Loving You) is the ninth album by Dutch musician Thijs van Leer, released under the name Van Leer.

== Track listing ==
1. I Hate Myself (for Loving You) 4:43
2. My Inspiration 4:37
3. I Think of You 5:56
4. Tempted 4:09
5. Too Good to Be True 4:20
6. Manchildren 4:43
7. Hollywood Blues 6:00
8. You Got Me 4:48
9. Sensitive Boy 4:41
10. Shock Treatment 5:22
11. All Because of You 4:26 (bonus CD track)

== Personnel ==
- Peter Vlietstra – Drums
- Bobby Jacobs – Bass
- Jan Peter Eerenberg – Guitar
- Luis Luz – Percussion
- Michael Gillespie – Vocals, Guitar, Synthesizer
- Thijs van Leer – Synthesizer, Piano, Organ, Flute

=== Guest musicians ===
- Eet Albers – Guitar on 1 and 6
- Frank auf dem Brink – Hi Hat on 1 and 6
- Pietro Lacirignola – Saxophone on 8 and 9
