= Spectacular! (soundtrack) =

Spectacular!: Music from the Nickelodeon Original Movie

Soundtrack album by Spectacular! cast
- Released: February 3, 2009
- Recorded: 2008
- Genre: Pop; rock
- Length: 40:26
- Label: Nickelodeon; Columbia

Spectacular!: Music from the Nickelodeon Original Movie is the soundtrack for the TV movie Spectacular!. The album was released on February 3, 2009 by Nickelodeon Records. The soundtrack was released in the UK on October 19 by Sony Music.

The album contains songs from the movie, such as "Don't Tell Me" by the show's headlining star, Nolan Gerard Funk. Other songs, such as "Something to Believe In" and "Everything Can Change", are sung by the whole cast. "Don't Tell Me" and "Everything Can Change" were released as promotional singles on November 11, 2008, and got music videos. The song “Eye of the Tiger” was also used in the 2010 film Cats & Dogs: The Revenge of Kitty Galore.

== Commercial performance ==
The album peaked at number 44 on the Billboard 200, and has sold over 52,000 copies to date (as of March 2009). The song "Break My Heart" peaked at number 95 on the Billboard Hot 100. On iTunes, the soundtrack hit the very top for bestselling soundtrack, if only for a short amount of time.

The majority of the soundtrack was written by Matthew Gerrard and Robbie Nevil.

== Track listing ==
No.	Title	Performed by	Length
1.	"Don't Tell Me"	Nolan Gerard Funk	3:19
2.	"Break My Heart"	Nolan Gerard Funk	3:10
3.	"Dance with Me"	Tammin Sursok	3:14
4.	"Lonely Love Song"	Victoria Justice, Simon Curtis	3:09
5.	"Your Own Way"	Nolan Gerard Funk	3:21
6.	"For the First Time"	Tammin Sursok, Nolan Gerard Funk	3:39
7.	"Just Freak"	Tammin Sursok	3:07
8.	"On the Wings of a Dream"	Victoria Justice, Simon Curtis	3:23
9.	"Something to Believe In"	Tammin Sursok, Nolan Gerard Funk	4:35
10.	"Everything Can Change"	Tammin Sursok, Nolan Gerard Funk	2:58
11.	"Eye of the Tiger"	Tammin Sursok	3:32
12.	"Things We Do for Love"	Victoria Justice, Simon Curtis	2:59
Total length:			40:26

== Charts ==
=== Weekly charts ===
Weekly chart performance for Spectacular!: Music from the Nickelodeon Original Movie
Chart (2009)	Peak position
US Billboard 200	44
US Kid Albums (Billboard)	2
US Soundtrack Albums (Billboard)	5

=== Year-end charts ===
Year-end chart position for Spectacular!: Music from the Nickelodeon Original Movie
Chart (2009)	Position
US Kid Albums (Billboard)	23
