= Survival (band) =

Dutch Progressive / Symphonic rock band

Survival is a Dutch Progressive / Symphonic rock band/project, initiated in 1981 by keyboard player and composer Jack Langevelt and inspired by classic bands like Trace, Emerson, Lake & Palmer, Ekseption, The Nice, Camel, Procol Harum and Deep Purple. The sound of Survival is characterized by strong dynamic melodies with odd time signatures and epic themes. Survival existed as a band between 1981 and 1997, although Jack continued making music under the name Survival.

In 2008 Survival arose from its ashes and released their first official album Crusader on Musea Records. This all instrumental album, with guest appearances by David Dexter and Mario Roelofsen on guitar, was composed, recorded and produced by Jack Langevelt and received very positive reviews. Presently (2013) Survival is back again in a new line-up, with Inez van der Linden as new manager (known for Rick van der Linden/Ekseption/Trace) and a new bookings agency.

Jack Langevelt was born on August 5, 1954, in Rotterdam, the Netherlands. In his early childhood he had warm feelings for classical music, such as Bach, Mozart and Chopin. After hearing "Air," by Ekseption, he fell in love with the music of Rick van der Linden. Ekseption, Trace, The Nice and Emerson, Lake & Palmer were his major influences. This symphonic music highlighted his favourite instruments, Hammond organ and piano. After he had some piano lessons, he studied at the Rotterdam School of Arts (1971). At the same time he started his musical career as a drummer in various groups and styles. In 1980 he switched to his first love, keyboard playing in symphonic rock music. He formed his own group Survival. With this group (1981–1997) he developed his ideas in his own compositions which were a synthesis of classical, rock and jazz music. In 1997 Survival split up, but Jack continued making music under his name and the name Survival. For two years Jack developed a more intuitive style of music, played and composed only by himself. The result was the album The Final Chapter (1999). For the next two years he was occupied creating his own recording studio (BJT Studios). With this studio he saw no limitations anymore for creating, composing and producing his music on a level that was more to his satisfaction. With the help of vocalist Linda Maarseveen and guitar players David Dexter (from the UK), Mario Roelofsen (Purple Rainbow) and Jan Peter Eerenberg (Thijs van Leer Band) he recorded more than 30 songs. As a result, he made two progressive/symphonic/classic rock demo albums, Con Brio and Montgisard (self-released).

== Albums ==
- The Final Chapter (1999) Self-released
- Montgisard (2006) Demo CD
- Con Brio (2008) Demo CD
- Crusader (2008) Musea release

== Members ==
- Jack Langevelt: (Hammond, Piano, Synthesizers, Mellotron, Composer)
- Nigel Foss: (Guitars)
- Amanda: (Vocals, Violin)
- Frans Muys van de Moer: (Bass)
- Cor Links: (Drums)

== Former members & guests (1978 - 2016) ==
- Patrick Milar: Guitar 2015 - 2016
- Jacomijne Driessen: Vocals 2015 - 2016
- Linda Maarseveen: Vocals 2014 - 2015
- Dave Dexter: Guitar 2013 - 2015
- Wikke van Wershoven: Drums 2013 - 2014
- Carolien Goeman: Vocals 2013 - 2014
- Pim van Wel: Drums 1981 - 1986
- Fred Madern: Bass, Flute 1978 - 1985
- Joachim Keppel: Guitars 1981 - 1997
- Frank Keppel: Bass 1994 - 1997
- Hans Keppel: Drums 1986 - 1991
- Herman Maquelin: Guitars, Synths, Vocals 1978 - 1981
- Pieter Maclaine Pont: Bass 1986 - 1992
- Henriette van Nieuwpoort: Vocals 1986
- Gerard Wold: Vocals 1986
- Jacqueline v/d Heide: Vocals 1988 - 1991
- Carlos Breton Jr: Bass 1992 - 1995
- Yvonne Sloof: Vocals 1991 - 1993
- Daniëlle: Vocals 1991 - 1993
- Jacqueline Visser: Vocals 1991 - 1993
- Rob Pattiwael: Drums 1991 - 1994
- Bart Melsert: Bass 1991 - 1994
- Kerry Read: Vocals 1994 - 1996
- Rob Monteith: Drums 1996 - 1997
- Cora van den Berg: Vocals 1996 - 1997
- Yvonne Meester: Vocals 2000
- Hans van Zummeren: Bass (guest)
- Rini van Willigen: Vocals (guest)
- Ed Middelman: Vocals (guest)
- Martin Suys: Guitars (guest)
- Jan Peter Eerenberg: Guitars (guest)
- Mario Roelofsen: Guitars (guest)
