= Eli (Jan Akkerman & Kaz Lux album) =

Studio album by Jan Akkerman & Kaz Lux
- Released: 1976
- Label: Atlantic
- Producer: Richard DeBois; Jan Akkerman

Jan Akkerman & Kaz Lux chronology
Eli (1976)	Transparental (1980)

Jan Akkerman chronology
Tabernakel (1973)	Eli (1976)	Jan Akkerman (1977)

Eli is a collaborative studio album by Dutch guitarist Jan Akkerman and vocalist Kaz Lux. A departure from the progressive rock that Focus (Akkerman's previous band) produced, "Eli" is a concept album with elements of jazz, pop, and funk intermixed.

It won the Netherlands' Edison Award in 1976 for Best Album. The track "Strindberg" was written as a tribute to August Strindberg's works.

== Track listing ==
1. "Eli" 4:25
2. "Guardian Angel" 4:58
3. "Tranquillizer" 4:20
4. "Can't Fake a Good Time" 5:25
5. "There He Still Goes" 3:45
6. "Strindberg" 3:06
7. "Wings of Strings" 3:15
8. "Naked Actress" 5:45
9. "Fairytale" 3:45

== Personnel ==
- Kaz Lux - vocals
- Jan Akkerman - guitars, bass guitar
- Jasper van 't Hof - keyboards
- Rick van der Linden - keyboards
- Warwick Reading - bass guitar
- Pierre van der Linden - drums
- Richard DeBois - drums
- Nippy Noya - percussion
- Margriet Eshuis - backing vocals
- Maggie MacNeal - backing vocals
- Patricia Paay - backing vocals
