= Badhoevedorp =

- Town
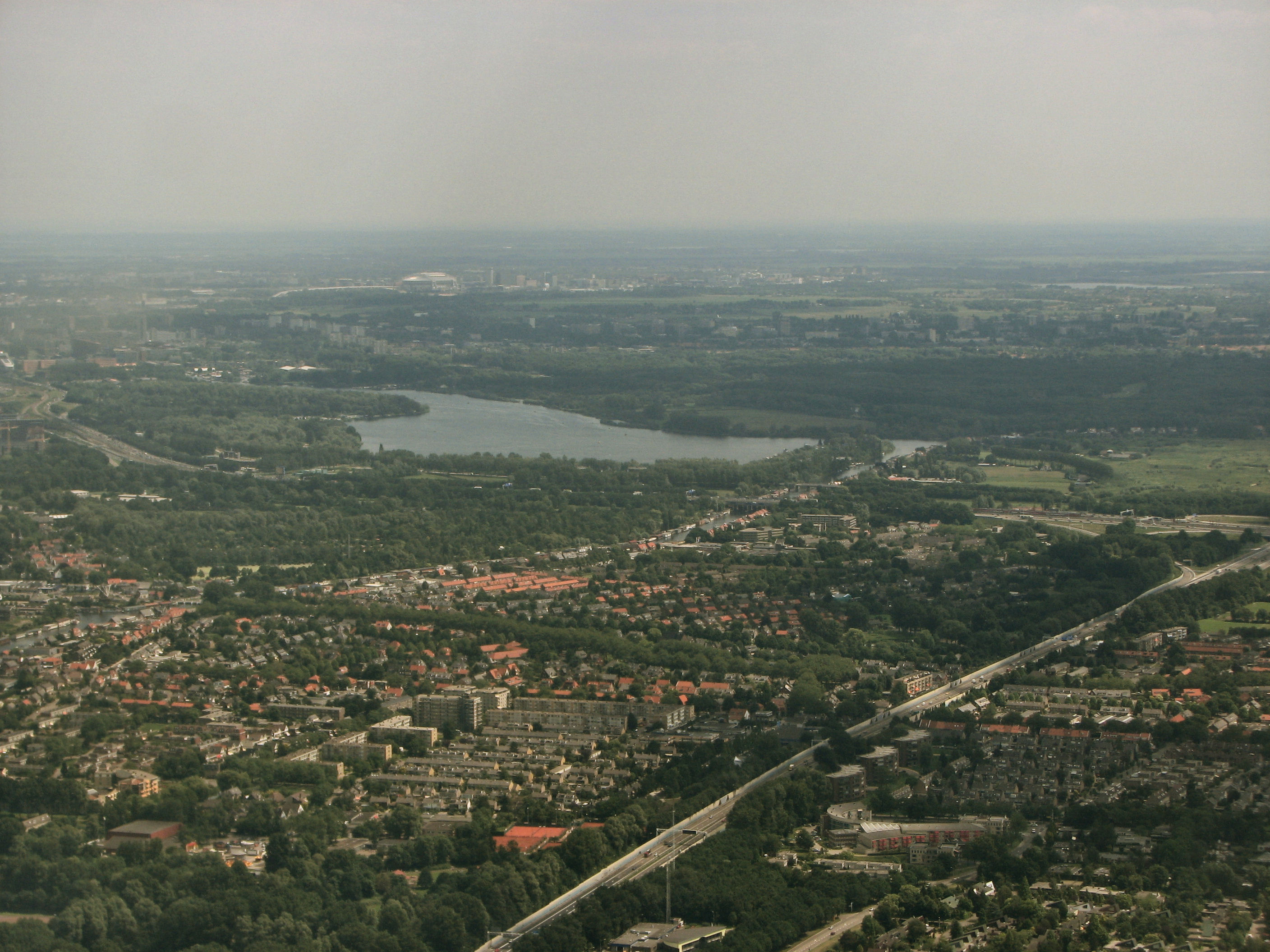
- Aerial view

- Location in the Netherlands Location in the province of North Holland in the Netherlands
- Coordinates: 52°20′N 4°47′E
- Country: Netherlands
- Province: North Holland
- Municipality: Haarlemmermeer

Area
  - Total: 9.09 km^{2} (3.51 sq mi)
- Elevation: −3.3 m (−11 ft)

Population (2021)
  - Total: 12.650
  - Density: 1.39/km^{2} (3.60/sq mi)
- Time zone: UTC+1 (CET)
  - Summer (DST): UTC+2 (CEST)
- Postal code: 1171
- Dialing code: 020

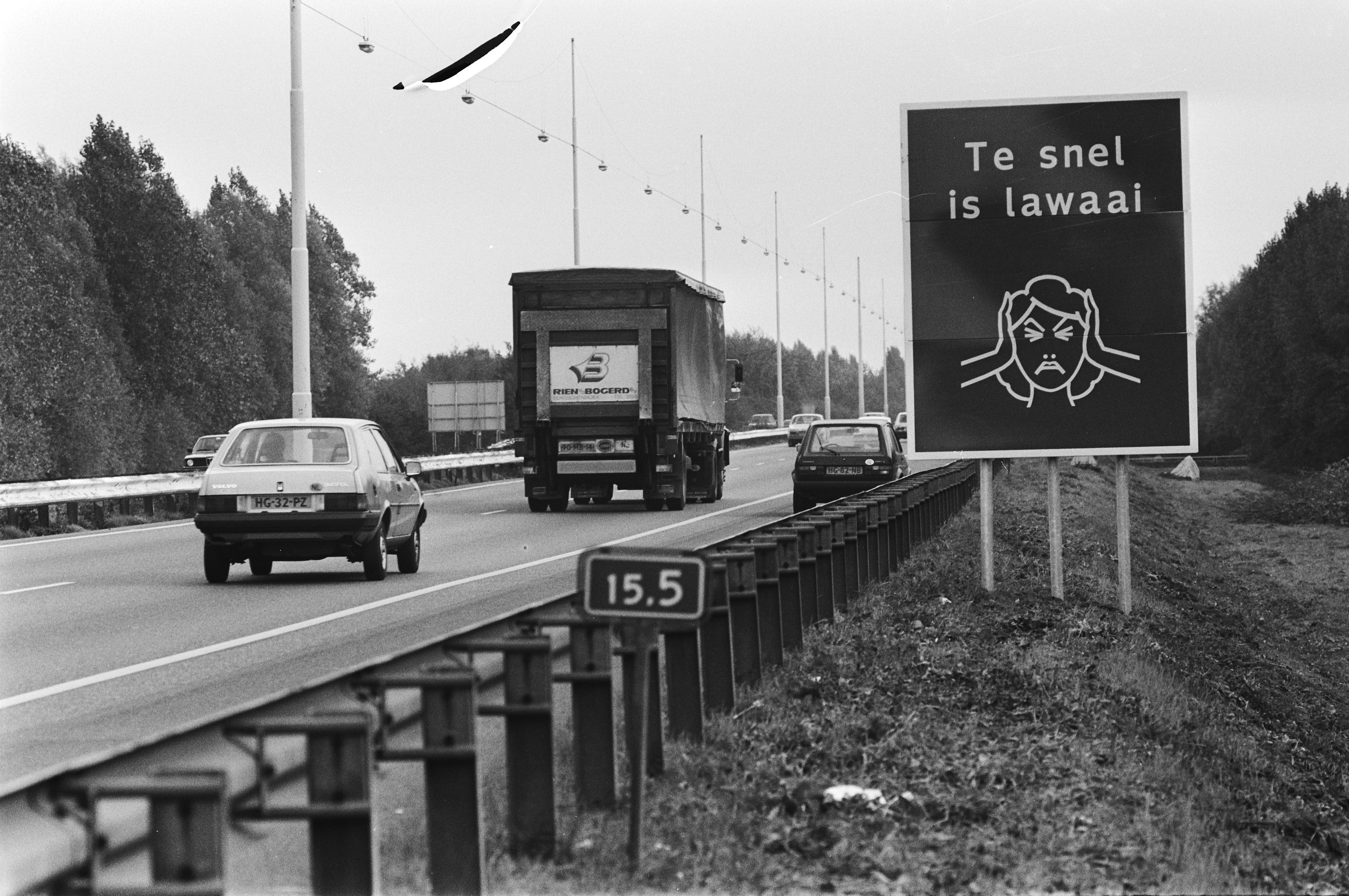
"Too fast is noisy" sign on the A9 in Badhoevedorp, 1982

Badhoevedorp is a town in the Western Netherlands, located in the municipality of Haarlemmermeer. It has a population of around 14.455.

The Rijksweg 9 passes near the town. From 8 August 1967, the motorway passed through the town. On 10 April 2017 was diverted, with the original section being closed and demolished to make place for new development in the area.

== Economy ==
MGA Entertainment's Benelux division has its headquarters in Badhoevedorp. Sony Corporation's Benelux and European divisions had their headquarters in Badhoevedorp until its European division was split between two new headquarters in Berlin (Sony Center Potsdamer Platz) and London in the early-2000s, while its Benelux division moved its headquarters to Hoofddorp in 2016. The former Sony Badhoevedorp building was converted into a hotel in 2019.

== Sports ==
The town's amateur sports club, SC Badhoevedorp, has futsal, baseball and softball divisions.

== Notable people from Badhoevedorp ==
Notable residents former Dutch national team footballers Marco van Basten, Jack van Gelder, Tonny Eyk and Toon van Driel.

- Jan Buis (1933), Dutch road cyclist
- Rick van der Linden (1946), Dutch composer and keyboardist, member of Ekseption, Trace, as well as solo
- George Boeree (1952–2021), psychologist and creator of Lingua Franca Nova
- Dick Benschop (1957), Dutch politician and corporate executive
- Sven Botman (2000), footballer for Premier League Club Newcastle United
