= Penney de Jager =

Dutch dancer and choreographer (born 1948)

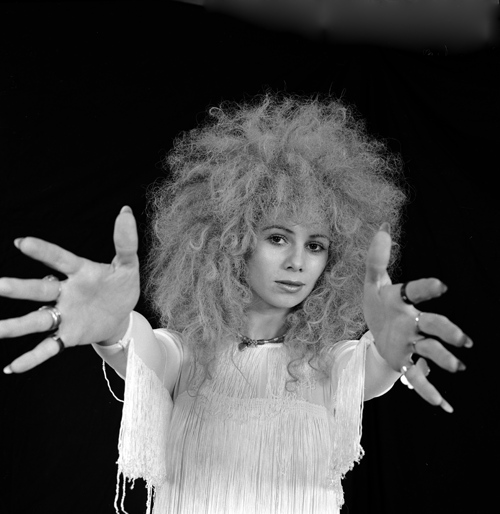
de Jager in 1970

Wilhelmina Maria (Penney) de Jager (born 2 January 1948 in Utrecht, Netherlands) is a Dutch dancer and choreographer.

De Jager received her training with Rotterdam's Scapino Ballet, and was then hired by the Dutch National Ballet. She achieved national fame when she began dancing and doing choreography for the jazz ballet of the popular television show TopPop (1970–1985). TopPop was a very popular music show in which artists mimed their hits in the television studio; if the artists were unavailable, one of the options was to have de Jager and her ballet perform a specially designed routine while the hit was played (ex. Meco's Star Wars Theme/Cantina Band). A reporter described her choreography 40 years later as striking, characterized by fluttering costumes and hair.

She founded the Penney de Jager Ballet (later called "Holland Show Ballet", with production assistance from Frank Wentink) and ran a dance school in Utrecht. In 1971 she got married (for a short period) to Rick van der Linden, then the keyboard player for Ekseption, with whom she had a son, Rick Jr.

De Jager had another son, David, who was adopted by a couple from the United States; later she followed him there. In the US she did choreography for TV ads and music videos. Having returned home for a vacation, she was not allowed to re-enter the US and stayed in the Netherlands. In 2008 she moved to Stichtse Vecht, where she continued teaching dance, now also for senior citizens. For these efforts she was invested as a Knight of the Order of Orange-Nassau in 2014.

De Jager appeared in Playboy magazine in 1985.
