= Strothmann =

Strothmann is a surname. Notable people with the surname include:

- Frederick Strothmann (1872–1958), American illustrator
- Lena Strothmann, (born 1952), German CDU politician, Bundestag member for Bielefeld – Gütersloh II, 2013–2017
- Markus Strothmann (born 1985), German jazz drummer

== See also ==
- Strothmann Weizenkorn, a variety of the liquor Korn
