= Bad Seed =

Bad Seed(s) or The Bad Seed(s) may refer to:

== Films, television, and stage ==
- The Bad Seed, a 1954 novel by William March
  - The Bad Seed (play), a 1954 play adaptation by Maxwell Anderson
  - The Bad Seed (1956 film), a film adaptation of the play, directed by Mervyn LeRoy
  - The Bad Seed (1985 film), a television adaptation of the play
  - The Bad Seed (2018 film), a television adaptation, directed by and starring Rob Lowe and Mckenna Grace
  - The Bad Seed Returns, a 2022 sequel to the 2018 film, starring Mckenna Grace who reprises her role
- Bad Seed, originally titled Preston Tylk, a 2000 film by Jon Bokenkamp
- Bad Seeds (2016 film) (Les Mauvaises herbes), a Canadian film directed by Louis Bélanger
- Bad Seeds (2018 film) (Mauvaises herbes), a French film directed by Kheiron
- Bad Seeds (2021 film) (Mauvaises herbes), a Canadian short film directed by Claude Cloutier
- The Bad Seed (TV series), a 2019 New Zealand crime drama
- "Bad Seed" (CSI: Miami), a 2009 television episode
- "Bad Seed" (Juliet Bravo), a 1983 television episode
- "The Bad Seed" (Supernatural), a 2015 television episode
- "Bad Seed" (Wire in the Blood), a 2005 TV television episode

== Literature ==
- The Bad Seed, a 2019 The Food Group children's book by Jory John
- Bad Seed, a biography of Nick Cave, by Ian Johnston

== Music ==
- Nick Cave and the Bad Seeds, an Australian rock/post-punk band
- The Bad Seeds (American band), a 1960s garage rock band
- Bad Seed (Jan Howard album), 1966
- "Bad Seed" (Jan Howard song), 1966
- Mutiny/The Bad Seed, a 1983 album by the Birthday Party
- Bad Seed, a 2009 album by Boozed
- "Bad Seed", a 1997 song by Metallica from ReLoad
- "Bad Seed", a 2015 song by Ugly Kid Joe from Uglier Than They Used ta Be

== See also ==
- Mauvaise Graine (lit. Bad Seed), a 1934 French drama film
