= A Picture of You (Joe Brown song) =

Single by Joe Brown
- A-side: "A Lay-About's Lament"
- Released: 27 April 1962
- Recorded: 1962
- Studio: The Workhouse Studio, London
- Genre: Pop
- Length: 2:20
- Label: Pye
- Songwriters: John Beveridge; Peter Oakman

"A Picture of You" is a song by English entertainer Joe Brown. Written by two members of his backing band, guitarist John Beveridge and bassist Peter Oakman, it was a number 1 UK hit single for Brown in the summer of 1962. Brown recorded his version at Pye Records, and the single was released as Piccadilly 7N 35047.

Although "A Picture of You" is designated as the B-side of "A Lay-About's Lament", it was the former song which became the chart hit. The song entered the charts at Number 27 on 24 May 1962, spent nine weeks in the UK Singles Chart Top 5 (from the week of 14 June 1962 through the week of 9 August 1962) during a nineteen-week chart run. The song was placed thirteenth on the chart of overall single sales for the calendar year 1962 in the UK.

The album A Picture of You, Joe Brown's first, was issued on Pye's budget Golden Guinea label (the records were marketed at the price of one Guinea, or one pound and a shilling) in 1962, and entered the NME album chart at number 10 on 25 August 1962. It stayed in the top ten for the next 15 weeks. The album also included the smaller hits Shine (reached No 33 in the UK singles charts in 1961) and What A Crazy World We're Livin' In (reached number 37 in the UK singles charts in 1962, just prior to A Picture of You).

== Charts ==
=== Weekly charts ===
Chart (1962)	Peak position
New Zealand (lever hit parade)	2
United Kingdom (NME)	1
UK Singles (OCC)	2

=== Year-end charts ===
Chart (1962)	Peak position
UK Singles (Official Charts Company)	13

== Covers ==
- The Beatles performed the song on the BBC radio programme Teenager's Turn – Here We Go, broadcast on 15 June 1962.
- In 1963 the song was covered by Johnny and his Cellar Rockers, the first band of the Dutch guitar-player Jan Akkerman.
- In 1970, Jack Wild recorded a version as the 'B' side to his minor hit, "Some Beautiful", from The Jack Wild Album (1970).
- Robert Gordon included the song on his 1980 album Bad Boy.
