= Nippy Noya =

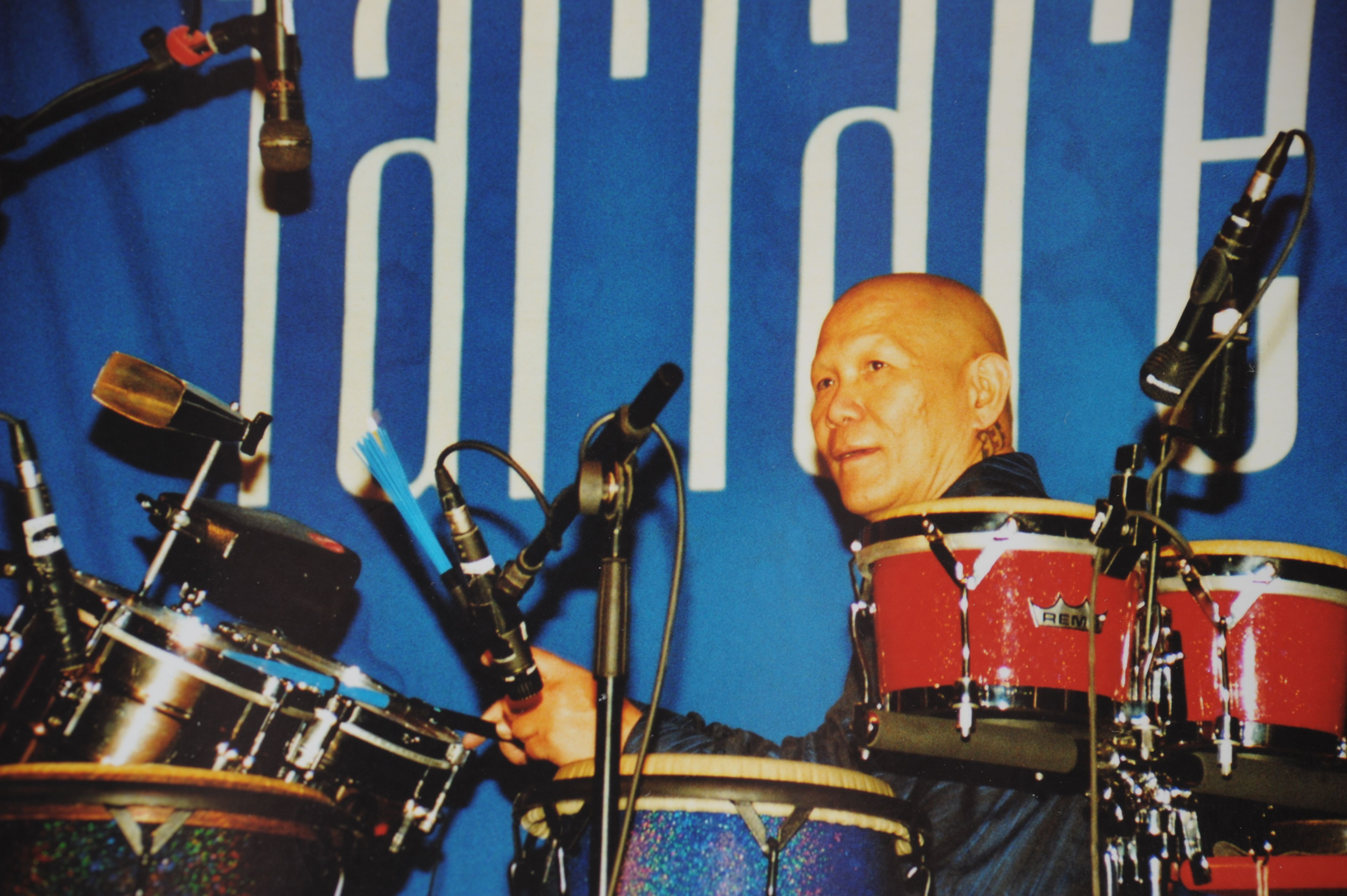

Background information
- Born: 27 February 1946 (age 80); Sulawesi
- Origin: Indonesia
- Genres: Jazz fusion
- Occupations: Percussionist, songwriter
- Instruments: Kalimba, congas, bongos, campana, güiro, cabasa, shekere, caxixi, triangle, berimbau

Nippy Noya (born 27 February 1946) is an Indonesian, Netherlands-based percussionist and songwriter, specialising in congas, kalimba, bongos, campana, güiro, cabasa, shekere, caxixi, triangle and the berimbau.

== History ==
Son of Japanese Taiko drummer Fusao San Nakato, he was born on the Indonesian island of Sulawesi and came to Europe in 1968. He began his professional career as a conga player with Dutch-Moloccan rock band Massada. He played with them till 2016 on and off whilst becoming a sought-after musician; he made a one-off return for the recording of their 2018-released live dvd.

Artists he since played and recorded with include Peter Herbolzheimer, John McLaughlin, Jan Akkerman, Hellmut Hattler, Volker Kriegel, Earth and Fire, Stan Getz and Dick Morrissey. In addition he toured with Richard Tee, Eric Burdon, Billy Cobham, Miko Aleksic Chaka Khan, Peter Maffay, Udo Lindenberg, Gitte Haenning, John Hondorp and Herbert Grönemeyer. He also taught and performed with the young children of the Kelly Family, from the mid-1980s until the mid-1990s. He appeared on several Kelly Family albums, VHSs and live shows.

Since 1992, he has been a lecturer at the Conservatory of Music in Enschede, Netherlands.

In 2001, Noya joined a Polish jazz/funky band The Globetrotters, consisting of vocalist Kuba Badach, vibrafonist Bernard Maseli, and saxophonist Jerzy Główczewski. The band has released several albums.

== Discography ==
- To the World of the Future - Earth and Fire (1975)
- Eli - Jan Akkerman and Kaz Lux (1976)
- Billy Cobham Live: Flight Time - Billy Cobham (1980)
- Ark - The Animals (1983)
- Live - The Kelly Family (1988)
- Keep on Singing... - The Kelly Family (1989)
- Live in East Germany - The Kelly Family (1989, VHS)
- New World - The Kelly Family (1990)
- Honest Workers - The Kelly Family (1991)
- Streetlife - The Kelly Family (1992)
- WOW - The Kelly Family (1993)
- The Traveler - Billy Cobham (1993)
