= Ekseption 5 =

Studio album by Ekseption
- Released: 11 September 1972
- Studio: Phonogram Studios, Hilversum, Netherlands
- Genre: Rock, progressive rock, classical rock
- Length: 34:02
- Label: Philips
- Producer: Pieter Nieboer

Ekseption chronology
| Ekseption 00.04 (1971) | Ekseption 5 (1972) | Trinity (1973) |

Ekseption 5 is the fifth studio album by the Dutch progressive rock band Ekseption, released in 1972.

== Track listing ==
All tracks are written by Rick van der Linden except where noted.

Side two
| No. | Title | Length |
|---|---|---|
| 1. | "Introduction" (L. van Beethoven) | 0:35 |
| 2. | "Siciliano" (J. S. Bach) | 3:20 |
| 3. | "Vivace" (J. S. Bach) | 2:51 |
| 4. | "For Example / For Sure" (K. Emerson, R. van der Linden) | 9:03 |
| 5. | "Virginal" | 4:30 |
| Total length: | | 20:19 |

Side two
| No. | Title | Length |
|---|---|---|
| 1. | "A La Turka" (W. A. Mozart) | 2:26 |
| 2. | "Midbar Session" | 10:03 |
| 3. | "Pie" | 1:30 |
| 4. | "My Son" (Guest - Rick van der Linden junior) | 5:19 |
| 5. | "Finale" | 3:40 |
| Total length: | | 22:58 |
