= Brainbox (band) =

Dutch rock band

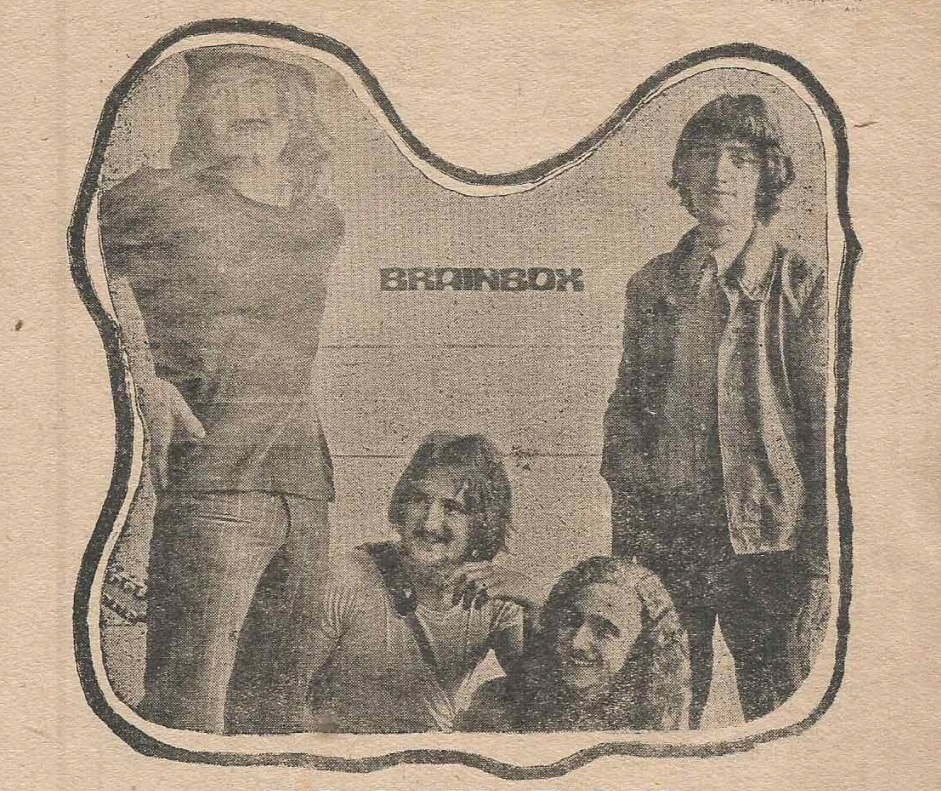
- Brainbox, (1970).

Background information
- Origin: Amsterdam, Netherlands
- Genres: Blues rock; progressive rock; proto-prog; psychedelic rock; folk rock; funk rock; jazz fusion
- Years active: 1968–1972; 2009–present
- Labels: Imperial, Harvest, E-sound, Bovema, Pop One
- Members: Kazimir Lux; Pierre van der Linden; Rudy de Queljoe; Cees van der Laarse
- Past members: Jan Akkerman; Cyril Havermans; André Reijnen; Herman Meijer; John Schuursma; Frans Smit; Michel van Dijk; Robert Vererwij; Tonny de Queljoe; Ronnie Meyes

Brainbox is a Dutch rock group from the late 1960s/early 1970s. The band was founded in Amsterdam by guitarist Jan Akkerman , drummer Pierre van der Linden and singer Kazimir Lux (Kaz). Their debut single was "Down Man", which established their progressive blues sound. They had several hit singles in the Netherlands, including "Down Man". "Doomsday Train", "Summertime", "To You", "Virgin" and "The Smile".

In late 1969, soon after they released their first album, Akkerman left to join Focus, later recruiting van der Linden as well, then Brainbox bass player Cyril Havermans. They were replaced by guitarists Herman Meyer and Rudie de Queljoe and drummer Frans Smit. Meyer was later replaced by John Schuursma. After Kaz Lux left Brainbox in 1971, popularity waned and they split up in 1972. Lux reassembled the band in 2004 (though without Akkerman) and they performed in the Netherlands. In 2010 and 2011, the band performed again and recorded a new studio album, The 3rd Flood.

== Discography ==
=== Studio albums ===
- Brainbox (1969)
- Parts (1972)
- The 3rd Flood (2011)

=== Compilation albums ===
- The Best of Brainbox (1971)
- To You (1972)
- A History (1979)
- Brainbox (1979)
- The Very Best Brainbox Album Ever (2002)
- Singles & B-sides 1969-1971 (2023)

=== Live albums ===
- The Last Train live (2004)

=== Singles ===
| Year | Title | B-side | Chart Positions | | Album |
| Year | Title | B-side | NL Top 40 | NL Top 100 | Album |
|---|---|---|---|---|---|
| 1969 | "Down Man" | "Woman's Gone" | 13 | 7 | |
| 1969 | "Sea of Delight" | "Amsterdam, the First Days" | 30 | 27 | Brainbox |
| 1969 | "Summertime" / "Dark Rose" | | 16 | 17 | Brainbox |
| 1970 | "To You" | "So Helpless" | 19 | 18 | |
| 1970 | "Between Alpha And Omega" | "Cruel Train" | Tip | — | |
| 1970 | "Doomsday Train" | "Good Morning Day" | 16 | 10 | |
| 1970 | "The Smile (Old Friends Have a Right To)" | "The Flight" | 15 | 12 | |
| 1971 | "Virgin" | "Mobilae" | 20 | 10 | |
| 1971 | "Dilemma" | "If You Could Only Feel It" | Tip | — | Parts |
| 1972 | "A Part of Me Is a Part of You" | "When I Was Poor" | Tip | — | Parts |
"—" denotes releases that did not chart

- Tip – Tipparade bubbling Under chart
