= Ad Visser =

Dutch VJ, presenter, writer and music artist (born 1947)

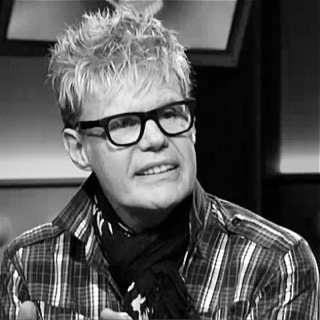
- Visser in 2011
- Born: 28 April 1947 (age 79); Amsterdam
- Occupations: presenter, musician

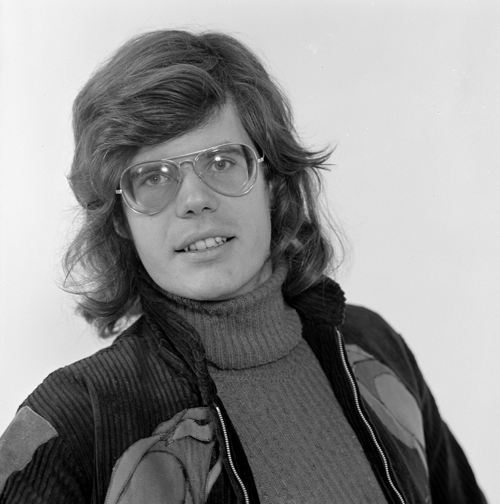
Visser in 1974

Ad Visser (born 28 April 1947, in Amsterdam) is a Dutch VJ, presenter, writer, and music artist.

== Career in the music industry ==
In 1965, Visser performed with his avant-garde pop trio Blurp on AVRO television.

He presented the AVRO programmes Superclean Dreammachine (1968–1980) and TopPop (1970–1985).

In 1982, he wrote a science-fiction novel called Sobriëtas and released an accompanying record as a multimedia project. The album was released in 18 countries and the single from the album, "Giddyap a Gogo", which Visser recorded with Daniel Sahuleka, reached the Dutch Top 40, which resulted in Visser's only appearance as an artist in his own Toppop programme.

In the 1990s, Visser released the Brainsessions CDs which generate alpha waves to give the listener a trance-like experience.

== Discography ==
- Het Geheim van de Wonderbaarlijke Kubus (Mamicha Music, 1981)
- Sobriëtas (CBS, 1982)
- Adventure (CBS, 1983)
- Hi-tec Heroes (Vertigo, 1987)
- Ad Visser's Brainsessions (Arcade, 1995)
- Ad Visser's Brainsessions, Vol. 2 (Arcade, 1997)
- Ad Visser's Kamasutra Experience (Universal, 1999)

== Bibliography ==
- Ad Visser: Strange days. Muzikale avonturen in de 60's en 70's. Baarn, Marmer, 2015. ISBN 978-94-6068-215-5
- Ad Visser: De parade van de hemelse tragedie. De langste song ter wereld. Vianen, The House of Books, 2005. ISBN 90-443-1292-8
- Ad Visser: Sobriëtas. Amsterdam, Meulenhoff, 1982. ISBN 90-290-2261-2 (German translation by Hildegard Höhr, München, Heyne, 1989) ISBN 3-453-03480-5
