= Transparental =

Studio album by Jan Akkerman
- Released: 1980
- Label: Ariola
- Producer: Frits Hirschland

Jan Akkerman chronology
The Best of Jan Akkerman and Friends (1979)	Transparental (1980)	Oil in the Family (1980)

Transparental is the ninth solo album by Dutch guitarist Jan Akkerman, released in 1980. It appeared under the name "Jan Akkerman and Kaz Lux".

== Track listing ==
1. "Inspiration" - 6:20
2. "Apocalypso" - 6:35
3. "Concentrate Don't Hesitate" - 6:35
4. "Transparental" - 1:10
5. "I Don't Take It Much Longer" - 3:55
6. "Marsha" - 5:20
7. "You're Not the Type" - 6:05
8. "The Party Is Over" - 4:40

== Personnel ==
- Kaz Lux - vocals, guitar
- Jan Akkerman - guitars, guitar synthesizer
- Cees van der Laarse - bass guitar
- Pierre van der Linden - drums
- Manuel Lopez - drums on tracks 6 and 8
- Rick van der Linden - keyboards
- Eddy Conard - percussion
- Grace van der Laarse - percussion
