= Profile (Jan Akkerman album) =

Studio album by Jan Akkerman
- Released: 1972
- Recorded: 1969
- Genre: Jazz; classical; rock
- Length: 37:32
- Label: BGO
- Producer: Tim Griek

Jan Akkerman chronology
Guitar for Sale	Profile	Tabernakel

Professional ratings
Review scores
Source	Rating
Allmusic	4/5 stars

Profile is an album by Dutch jazz guitarist Jan Akkerman.

== Track listing ==
1. "Fresh Air" (Akkerman) – 19:55
  1. (a) Must Be My Land
  2. (b) Wrestling to Get Out
  3. (c) Back Again
  4. (d) This Fight
  5. (e) Fresh Air – Blue Notes for Listening
  6. (f) Water and Skies Are Telling Me
  7. (g) Happy Gabriel?
2. "Kemp's Jig" (anonymous) – 1:34
3. "Etude" (Matteo Carcassi) – 1:33
4. "Blue Boy" (Akkerman) – 2:26
5. "Andante Sostenuto" (Anton Diabelli) – 4:09
6. "Maybe Just a Dream" (Akkerman) – 2:35
7. "Minstrel/Farmers Dance" (Akkerman) – 1:46
8. "Stick" (Akkerman) – 3:41

== Personnel ==
- Jan Akkerman – guitar, bass
- Ferry Maat – piano (track 8)
- Bert Ruiter – bass guitar
- Jaap van Eik – bass guitar (track 8)
- Pierre van der Linden – drums
- Frans Smit – drums (track 8)
