= Boozed =

German rock 'n' roll band

- Origin: Bramsche, Germany
- Genres: Hard rock, Rock and roll
- Years active: 2001–2018
- Labels: Bitzcore Records; Rude Records; Kamikaze Records; San Martin Records; Chorus Of One; Chequers 74; IML
- Members: Markus Strothmann; Klaas Ukena; Nico Choczko; Michael Ponert; Tim Mischke
- Past members: Marvin Drosten (2002-2008); Daniel Danlowski (2001-2002)
- Website: Official website

Boozed was a rock 'n' roll band from the north German town of Bramsche.

== History ==
They were formed in 2001 of five at that time on the average of 16-year-olds, first as AC/DC cover band . Afterwards they started to write increasingly their own songs.

. Markus Strothmann, Klaas Ukena, Marvin Drosten, Michael Ponert and Tim Mischke have been since 2001 to over 250 national and international shows among other things with bands like Turbonegro, Donots, Heideroosjes, Gluecifer, The Hellacopters, Beatsteaks, Peter Pan Speedrock, The Flaming Sideburns, Rose Tattoo and in 2009 they support the American hardrock act Monster Magnet. They have played on numerous festivals like Hurricane, Taubertal and Rheinkultur. After a rather average season in 2007, some concerts and festivals had to be cancelled, Boozed separated from guitarist Marvin Drosten due to his weak health at the beginning of 2008 and was replaced with Nico Choczko. That wasn’t easy, as the band members were pretty close friends, but looking back, it seems to have been the right decision for the band.

== Music Style ==
Their style shows a mixture of well-known bands such as Motörhead, Rolling Stones, Gluecifer and naturally AC/DC.

== Discography ==
=== Albums ===
- 2004: Seizin the Day
- 2005: Tight Pants
- 2007: Acid Blues
- 2009: One Mile
- 2018: Self Titled

=== EPs ===
- 2007: My Friends Are Gonna Be There Too
- 2009: Save Me
- 2009: You Gotta Go Again

=== Compilations ===
- 2009: Bad Seed

=== Splits ===
- 2003: Drunk’n'Dangerous/Monday K.O., Split with V8 Wankers
- 2004: Wild Boys/Pull Through, Split with Psychopunch
- 2006: Laserlight/Dream on, Split with The Flaming Sideburns
- 2007: Back In The Back Of A Cadillac, Split with December Peals

=== DVDs ===
- 2010: Boozed-History-DVD „IIIIIIIII“ (DIY)
- 2011: Boozed Grande Finale DVD
