= Johnny and his Cellar Rockers =

Dutch rock band

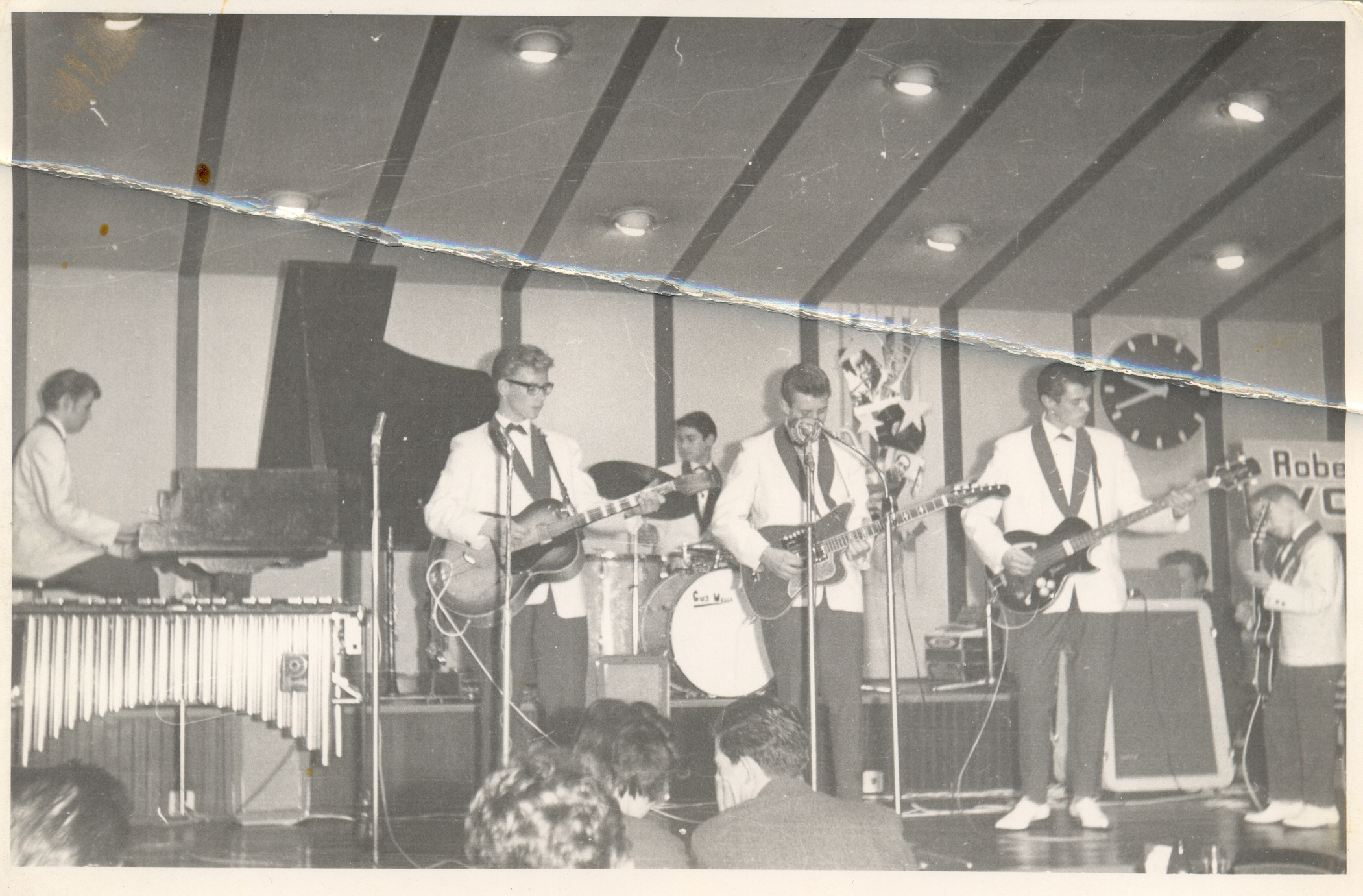
Johnny and his Cellar Rockers November 2, 1961

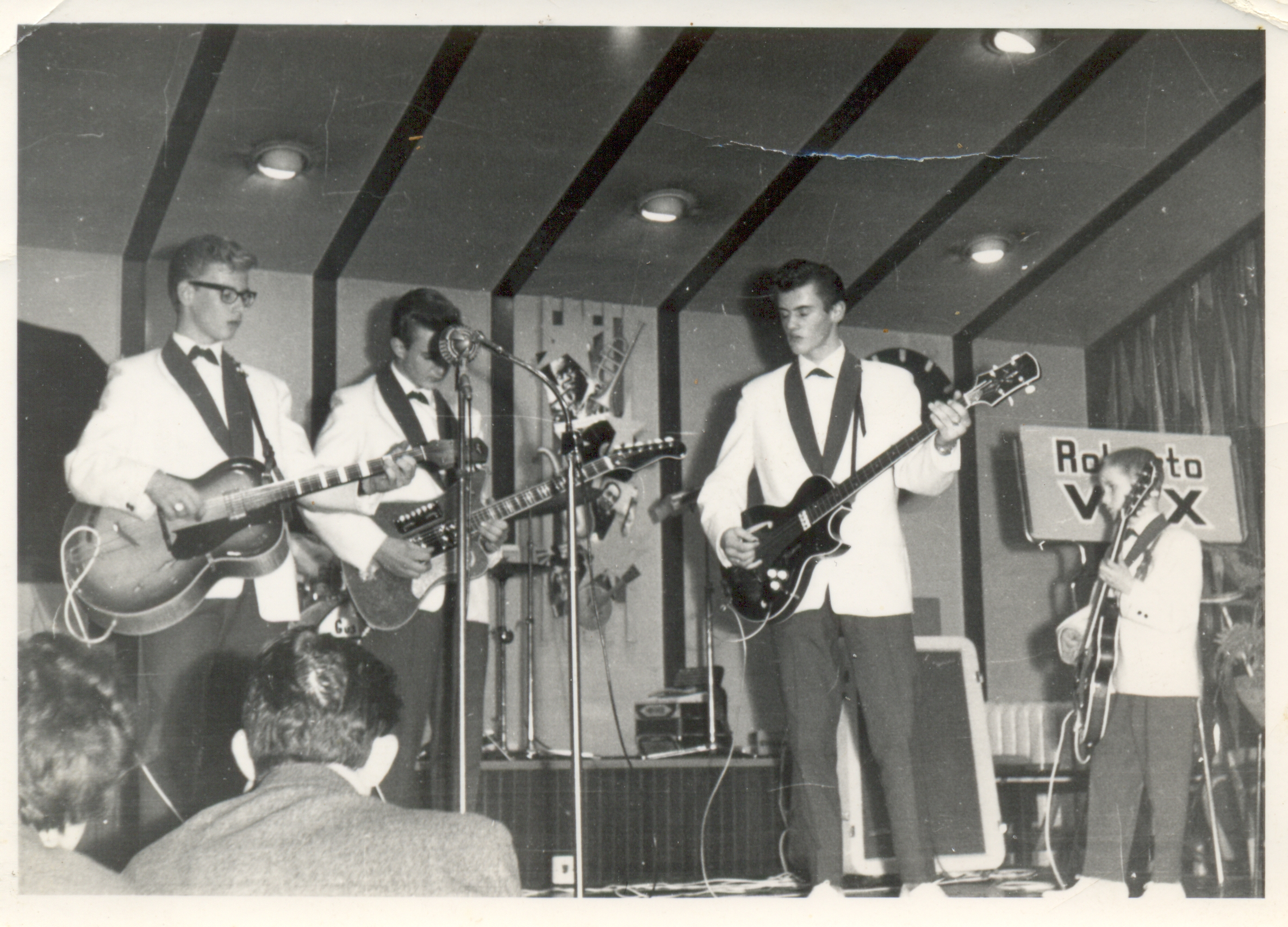
Johnny and his Cellar Rockers November 2, 1961

Johnny and his Cellar Rockers was the Dutch guitar player Jan Akkerman's first band from 1963. It also featured the drummer Pierre van der Linden who later joined Akkerman in Brainbox and Focus.

The band covered many songs, including "Sukiyaki" and "A Picture of You".
