= Daniël Sahuleka =

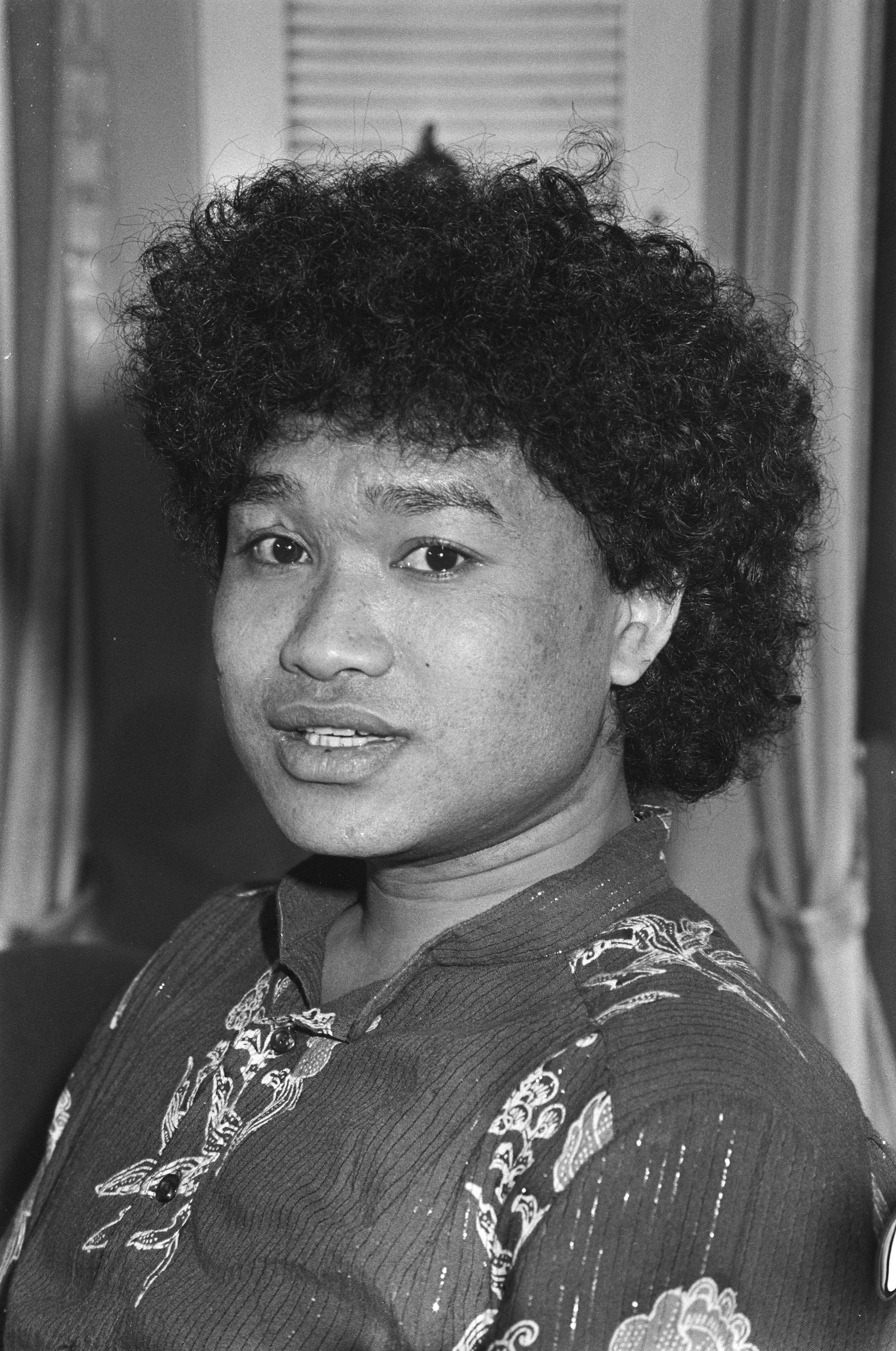
- Daniel Sahuleka (1981)

Background information
- Born: 6 December 1950 (age 75); Semarang, Central Java, Indonesia
- Origin: Huizen, Netherlands
- Genres: Pop, soul, disco, funk
- Occupations: Singer, musician
- Instruments: Vocals, guitar
- Years active: 1976–present
- Label: Sunflight
- Website: sahuleka.com

Daniël Sahuleka (born 6 December 1950) is an Indonesian-Dutch singer-songwriter and performing artist.

Sahuleka created more than 110 compositions. Daniel owns all copyright of his songs. Many of his songs have become evergreen hits, such as "You Make My World So Colourful" from the album Daniel Sahuleka (1977) and "Don't Sleep Away the Night" (1980).

In the early 1980s, Daniel's hits were "Wake Up" and "We'll Go Out Tonight". In 1993 Daniel's new hit was "I Adore You" and in 2007 he got a new hit with the song "If I Didn't". In 2009 he re-made new recordings of "You Make My World So Colourful" and "Don't Sleep Away" for his album "reMAKE mySTYLE" (iTUNES and physical album). In 1982 Daniel Sahuleka was greatly admired in Europe as vocalist of the song "Giddyap a Gogo", composed by Ad Visser, and the single reached the Dutch Top 40.

In Indonesia, Los Angeles and Europe, Sahuleka has received many prestigious awards. Also he was invited at many jazz festivals (Jakarta International Java Jazz Festival, Makassar International Festival, Kota Tua Creative Festival, etc.).

== Personal life ==
He was born in 1950 in Semarang, Central Java, Indonesia. Daniel had an Ambonese father, Simon Pieter Sahuleka (born 1919 in Saparua) and a Sundanese mother, Juarsi Mohanab (born 1924 in Pontianak, West Kalimantan). Daniel was raised in Winterswijk in the east of the Netherlands.

== Discography ==
=== Albums ===
- 1977: Sahuleka 1
- 1978: Sahuleka 2
- 1981: Sunbeam
- 1981: We'll Go Out Tonight with Daniel Sahuleka
- 1990: The Loner
- 1993: I Adore You
- 1995: RahASIA
- 1998: After the Jetlag
- 2003: Colorfool
- 2006: If I Didn't
- 2007: Christmas Love
- 2008: Eastern Journeys
- 2009: reMAKE mySTYLE
- 2010: Book "Daniel and his Songs" (in Bahasa Indonesia)
- 2011: reMAKE mySTYLE (in Indonesia and Singapore)
- 2015: " Dad's Request " Indonesia and on I Tunes Worldwide

=== Singles ===
- 1976: "You Make My World So Colourful"
- 1976: "Marie Claire"
- 1977: "Love to Love You"
- 1977: "The Change"
- 1978: "Long Distance Highway"
- 1979: "Finally Home Again"
- 1980: "Don't Sleep Away the Night"
- 1981: "We'll Go Out Tonight"
- 1981: "Wake Up"
- 1982: "Ev'rybody Feel the Groove"
- 1982: "Viva La Libertad"
- 1983: "Ev'ry Day"
- 1983: "Such Luck"
- 1983: "Skankin'
- 1984: "Dance in the Street"
- 1985: "Let Us All Be One"
- 1990: "Imagine"
- 1993: "You Make My World So Colourful" (live)
- 1995: "Bulan Pakai Payung"
- 1995: "Simphoni"
- 1996: "Dust of Life"
- 1998: "How Nice"
- 1998: "How I Love"
- 1998: "How Love"

=== RBT ===
- 2018: "Don't Sleep Away the Night"
- 2018: "If I Didn't"
- 2018: "The Rain"
- 2018: "You Make My World So Colourful"
- 2018: "I Adore You"
- 2018: "If I Didn't"
