= John Hondorp =

Dutch musician and professor

- Born: 1964 (age 61–62); Doetinchem, Gelderland, Netherlands
- Occupations: Musician; music educator
- Instrument: Hammond organ

John Hondorp (born 1964 in Doetinchem, Netherlands) is a professor at the Enschede Conservatory. He was the first to teach Hammond organ as a fully autonomous jazz major.

His international class of students come from all over the world to study with him in Enschede. In the last ten years, they came from the Netherlands, Germany, Switzerland, Sweden, Japan, and Indonesia. In March 2007, Hondorp was playing with the Enschede jazz quintet "5-ESSENCE" (quintessence) at the Indonesian Java Jazz Festival in Jakarta.

He has a master's degree in Hammond Organ from the Enschede Conservatory. He plays the jazz stages throughout Europe and toured with many European jazz artists like Ferdinand Povel, Judy Niemack, Bruno Castellucci, Nippy Noya. In 2004 he founded the John Hondorp Trio, with guitarist/composer Dominik Korte and drummer Marco Schmitz. After two seasons of playing they recorded the CD Open Stories in February 2006 at Organic Music Studio in Obing, Germany.

In 2007 John Hondorp was invited twice to perform and teach at Jazz festivals in Indonesia. His teaching activities were at UNJ (Universitas Negeri Jakarta), DAYA Music Institute and Universitas Pelita Harapan.

In 2008 John started his collaboration with German drummer Markus Strothmann. This collaboration grew into a strong duo "Transitions Organ duo". An energetic, flexible and highly interactive jazz playground. Regularly combined with featured soloists. In the last couple of years Transitions Organ Duo toured with Jeanfrançois Prins, Frederik Köster, Bart van Lier, Nippy Noya, Fredrik Lundin, Adrienne West Linley Hamilton, Bruno Castellucci Ulli Jünemann and Darmon Meader.

Starting March 1, 2013, John was appointed teacher for Hammond Organ at the Institut für Musik in Osnabrück, Germany. This institute is the only music academy in Germany where one can study Hammond Organ as an independent jazz major instrument. He left the Osnabrück Institute in the summer of 2019.

He is a singer/arranger with his own vocal jazz quartet IN 4 and publishes choir arrangements in pop and jazz music, available at sheetmusicplus.com

He plays with Wolf Martini and Gijs Dijkhuizen in the Wolf Martini Trio and Twente-region based jazz/fusion quintet the Uppertunes with compositions of bassist Erno Klijzing, featuring saxophone player Mark Lucassen and trumpet player Anne-Marie ten Heggeler.

== Recordings ==
- Session (1995)
- Lara's Dream - Martin Senders Quartett (2002)
- JH Trio (2004)
- Renn Kwartet (2004)
- Open Stories, John Hondorp Trio, DKP 0601, (June 2006)
- No Idea, Transitions (2013) Unit Records UTR 4493
- New Blues (Ruud Weber Band; 2014)
- Some Favourite Songs (Ansgar Specht; 2016)
- Ain't givin'up (Blues Company; 2019)
- VPRO TV series "Naar Bed" (2022)
