= TopPop =

Dutch pop music television series

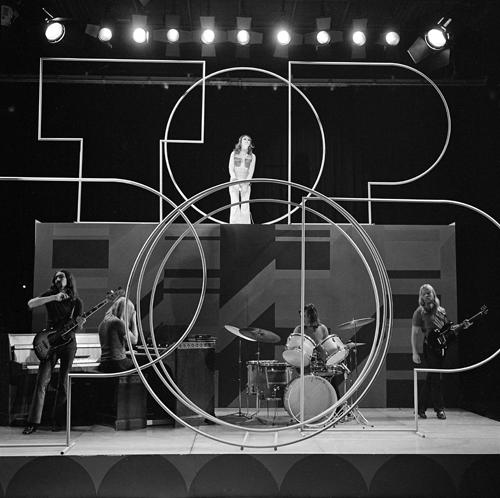
- Earth and Fire on the TopPop stage
- Created by: Rien van Wijk
- Based on: Top of the Pops by Johnnie Stewart
- Country of origin: Netherlands

Original release
- Network: AVRO
- Release: 22 September 1970 – 27 June 1988

Related
- Top of the Pops

TopPop is a Dutch television programme. It was the first regular dedicated pop music television series in the Dutch language area. The Netherlands broadcaster AVRO aired the programme weekly from 22 September 1970 to 27 June 1988. Presenter Ad Visser hosted for its first fifteen years. The creator and original director of TopPop was Rien van Wijk. Many other directors followed: Egbert van Hees, Geert Popma, Henk Renou, Chris Berger, Jessy Winkelman, Wim van der Linden, Bert van der Veer and Charly Noise. Although TopPop was inspired by the British music programme Top of the Pops, it was completely unrelated.

== Description ==
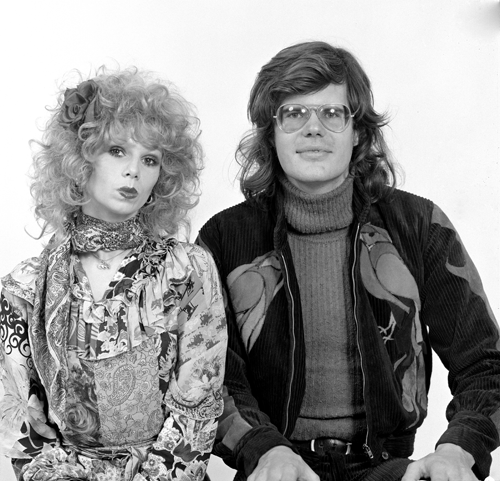
Show presenter Ad Visser and dance troupe leader Penney de Jager

The main approach was to let music artists mime to their latest hit record in the TopPop studio. However, most music acts in the Dutch pop charts were foreign to the Netherlands, and frequently not available for a performance in the studio. If this was the case, it was sometimes possible for the TopPop camera crew to meet the artist at another location. Consequently, artists were filmed around the world, including Tom Browne in a studio in New York City, David Cassidy at the airport in Schiphol, and Barry White at his home in Los Angeles. If there was no way to feature the artists on TopPop, their promo video would be played - if one existed, since prior to the 1980s these were not routinely created. If all else failed, there was a fourth option that the programme frequently had to resort to: hit songs were played to a dance routine by dancer and choreographer Penney de Jager and her troupe. When music videos became more common on television, the popularity of TopPop decreased and the programme was stopped in 1988. TopPop was chosen as the programme of the century in a poll in 2000 by Televizier.

For many Dutch and Flemish viewers, TopPop was the primary source of information about pop music. TopPop compiled its own hit chart, based on viewers' top-ten lists, sent in on postcards, from 1970 to 1974, from 1978 to 1982 and from 23 February 1986 to 10 July 1988. However, it used the Dutch National Hitparade, a sales-based list, from 1974 to 1978 and from 1982 to 1986.

In the last programme of each year, the annual complete Top 10 was broadcast. There were performances by studio guests, and there were polls among viewers on the most popular artist, group and DJ. Looking back on the year 1976, Ad Visser and Krijn Torringa were sitting behind a desk in an office which made it a parody of Van Oekel's Discohoek. This absurd programme was itself a parody of TopPop.

Notable performances include one in 1977, by Iggy Pop, who refused to leave his dressing room and then, during a rehearsal, stormed dramatically and unexpectedly onto the studio floor. He spent most of the song writhing on the floor without a shirt on, miming his hit single and destroying some plants that had been put on the floor as decoration. For many young viewers in the Netherlands, this was their first encounter with punk rock.

Some TopPop-made videos were of such quality, the performing artist chose to use it as their promotional video. Examples are the 1974 sequence of an eye-patched David Bowie miming to "Rebel Rebel", and Nena walking through a wood-cuttery at Crailoo near Hilversum, imagining a post-war devastated area fit for the Cold War atmosphere of her 1983 hit "99 Red Balloons".

The famous archive of performances can be viewed online.

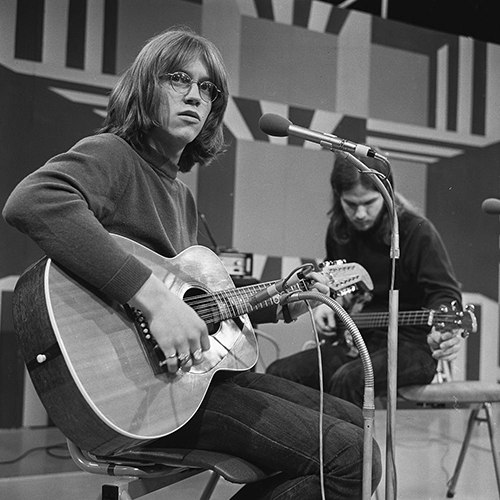
America (1972)

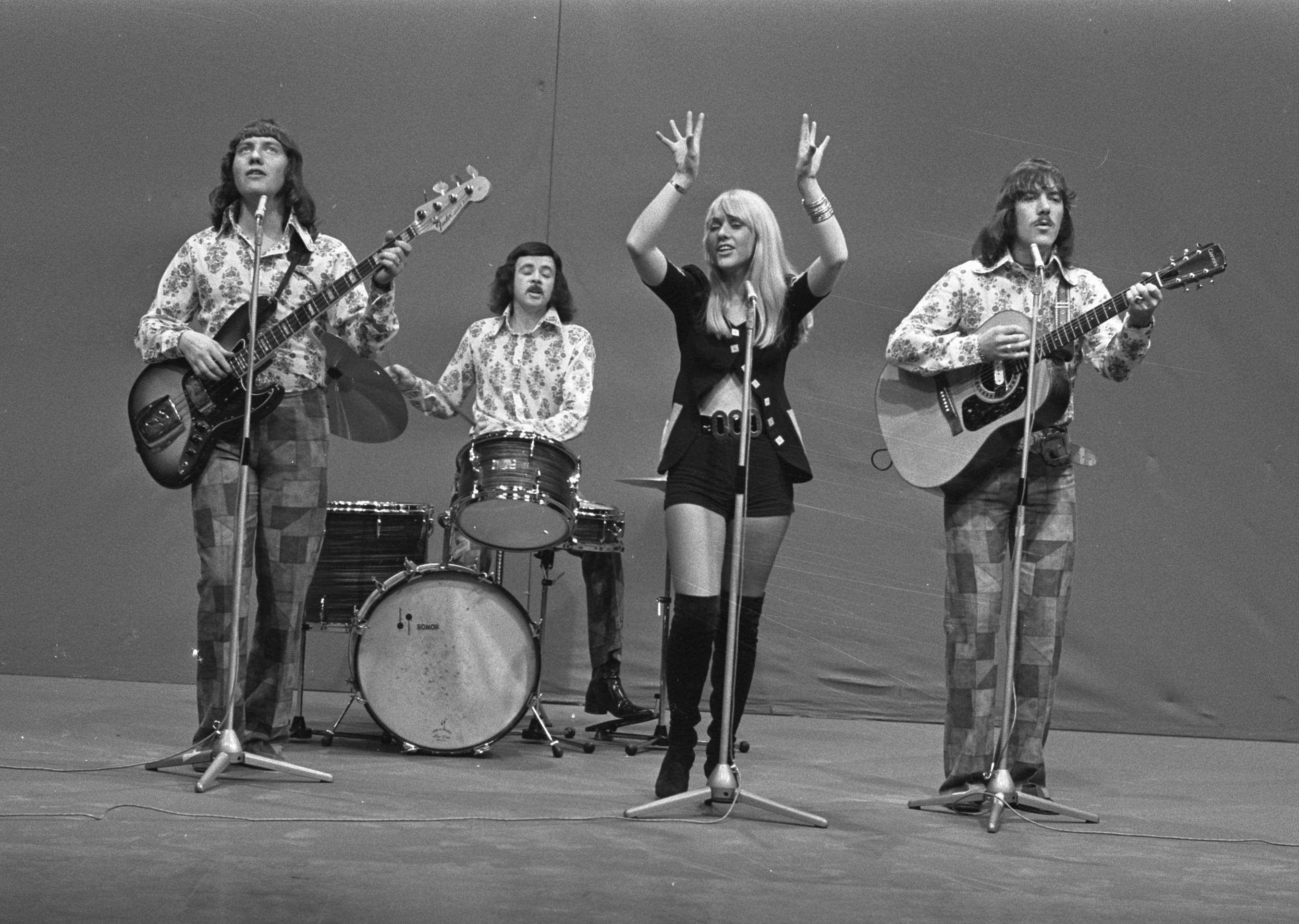
Middle of the Road (1972)

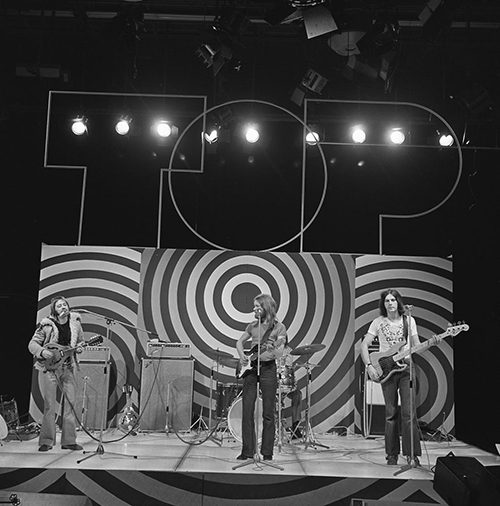
Fairport Convention (1972)

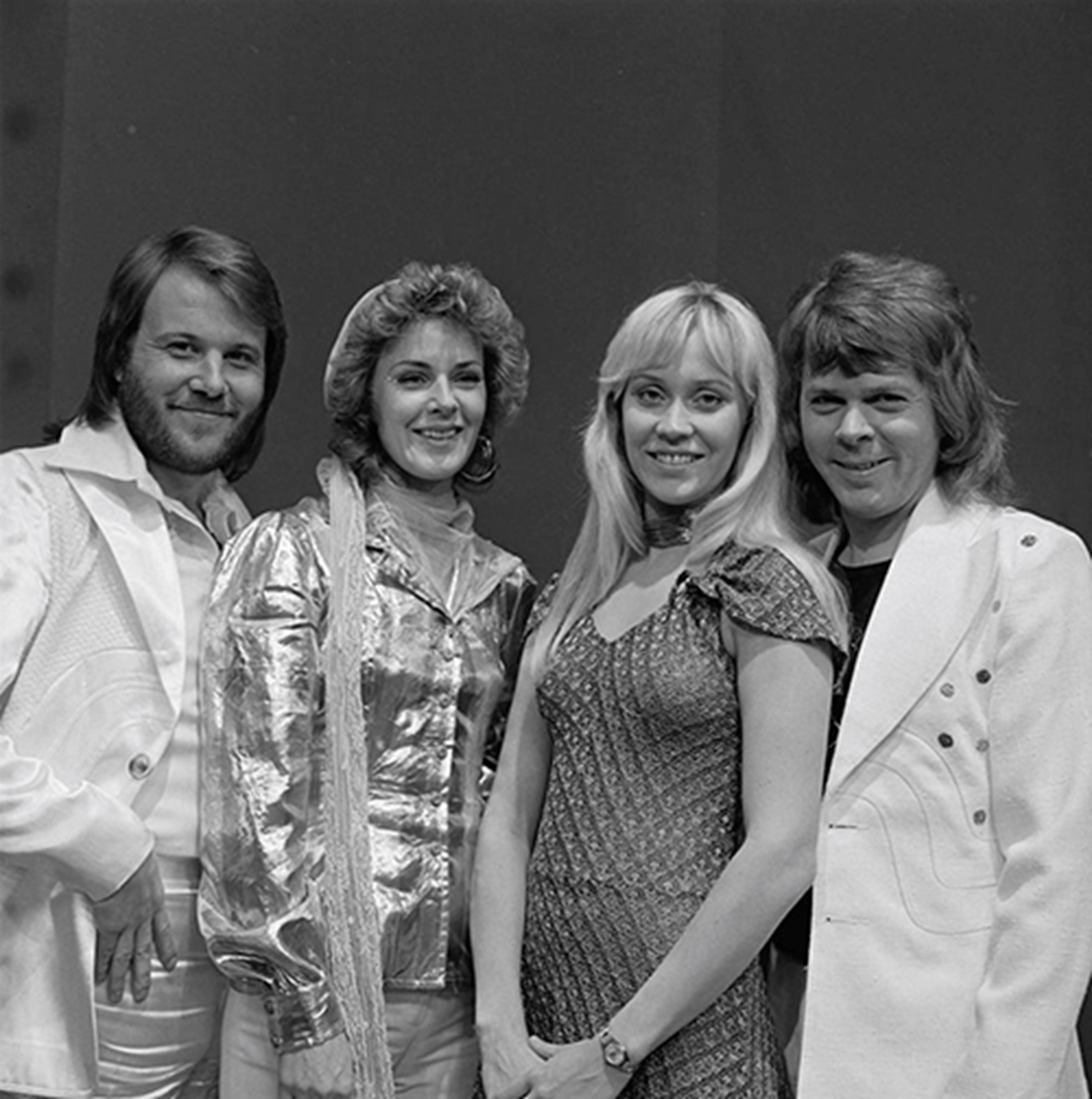
ABBA (1974)

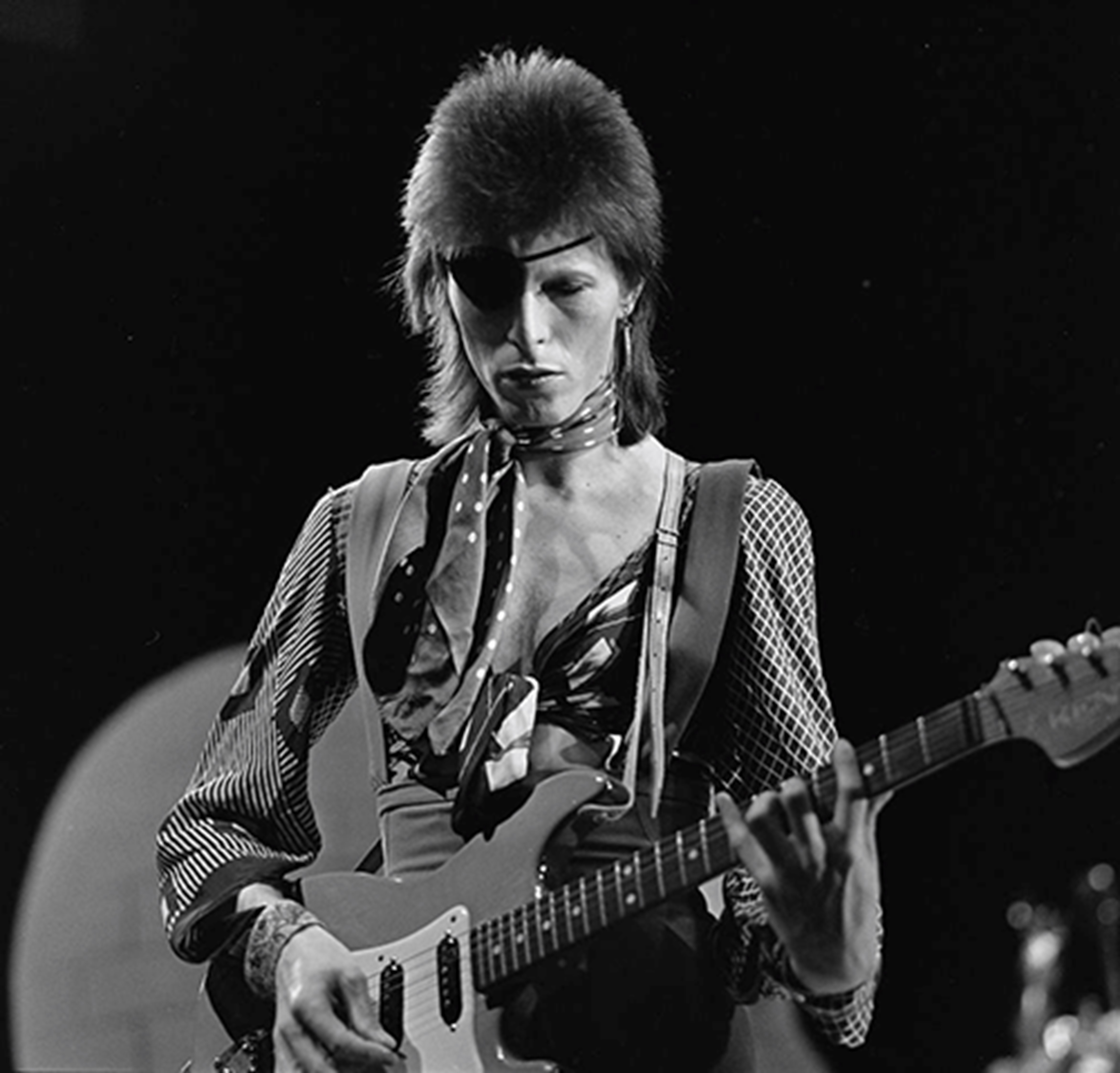
David Bowie (1974)

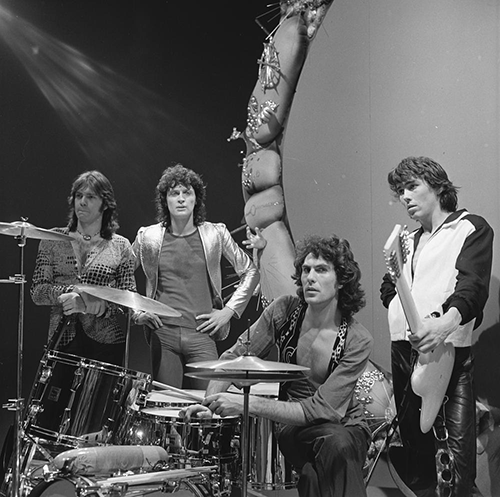
Golden Earring (1974)

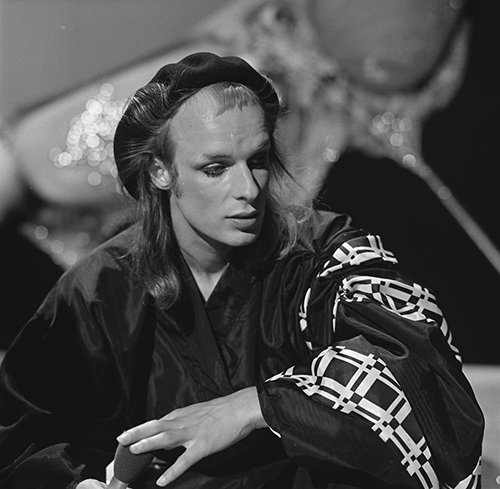
Brian Eno (1974)

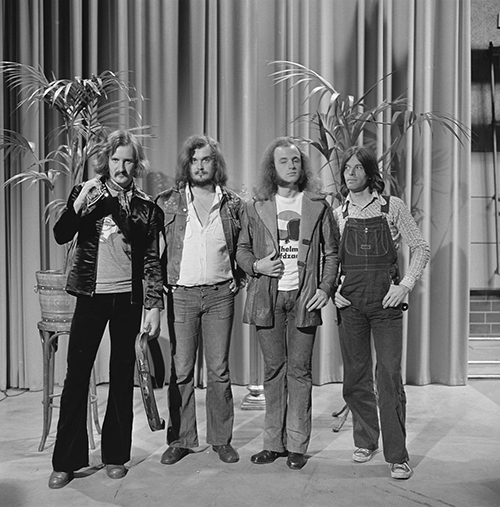
Focus (1974)

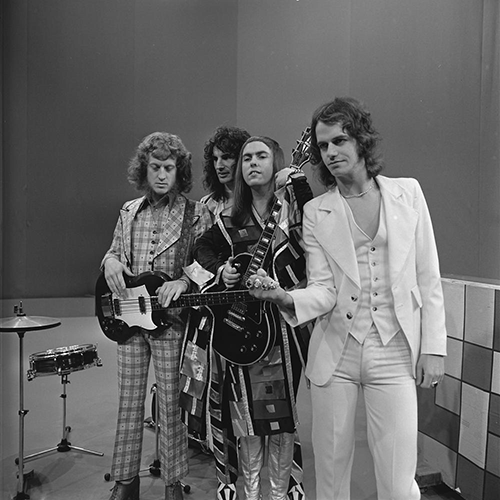
Slade (1974)

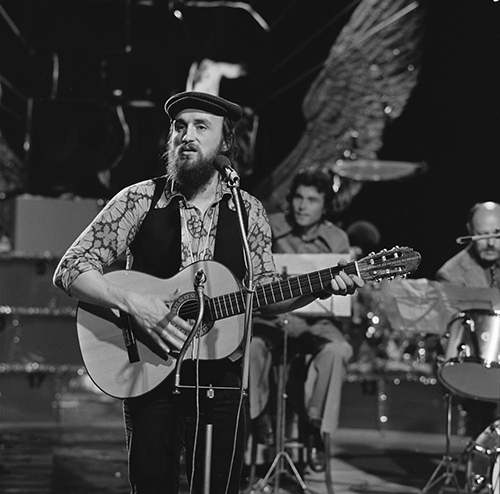
Ivan Heylen (1974)

== Variety of music styles ==
The list of performers during 18 years of TopPop is of course quite large. Most stunning is the variety of music styles: from mainstream (ABBA, Charles Aznavour, Bee Gees, The Carpenters, John Denver, Everly Brothers, Elton John, the Pointer Sisters ) to new or experimental (David Bowie, Kate Bush, Joe Jackson, Roxy Music), and from middle of the road music (Boney M., Middle of the Road, Nana Mouskouri) to ska and punk (The Beat, Elvis Costello, Ian Dury and The Blockheads, Iggy Pop, Siouxsie and the Banshees).
