= Trace (band) =

Dutch progressive rock band

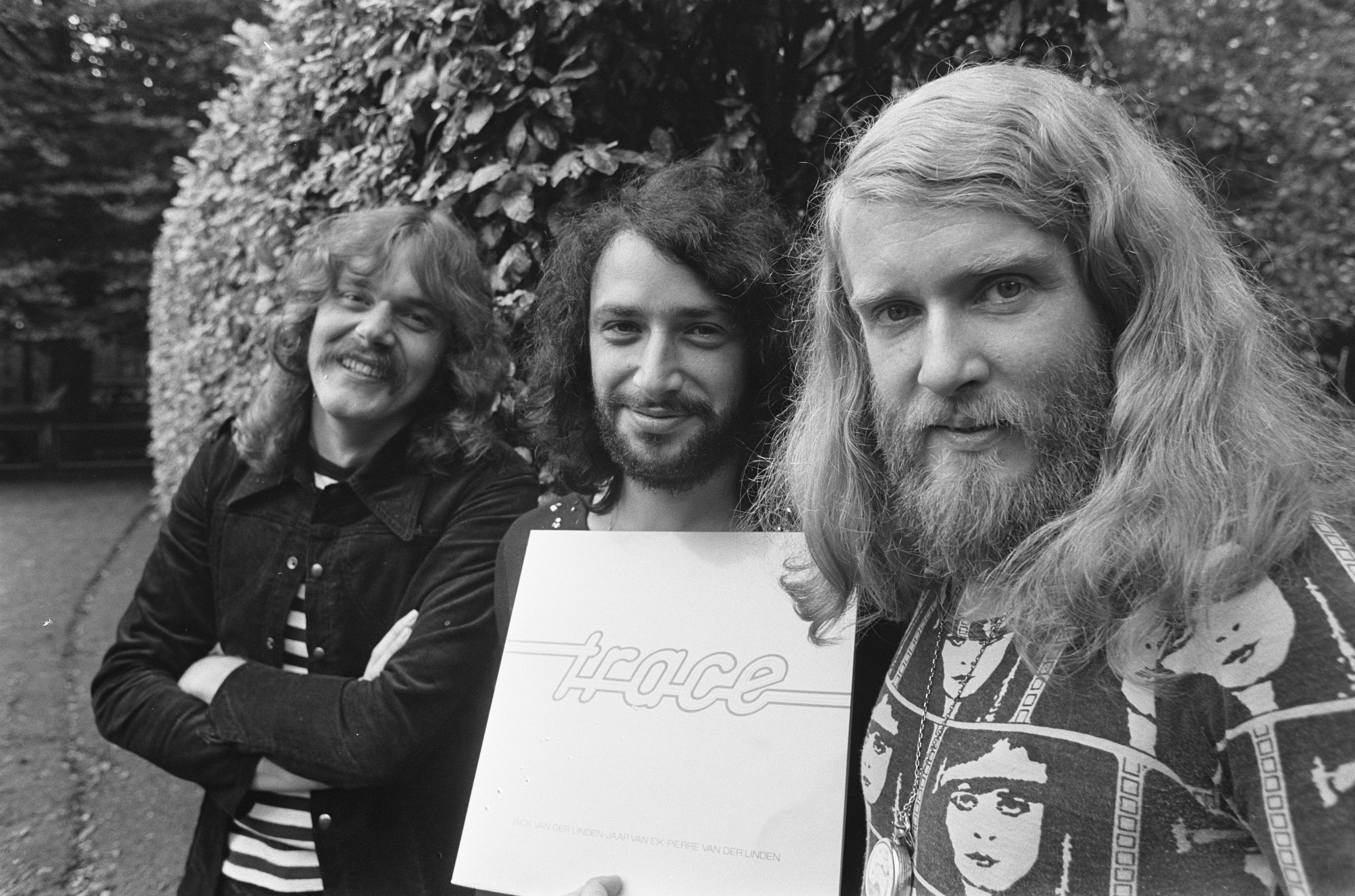
- The band in 1974. From left to right: Jaap van Eik, Pierre van der Linden & Rick van der Linden

Background information
- Origin: Haarlem, Netherlands
- Genres: Progressive rock; instrumental rock
- Years active: 1974–1978
- Past members: Jaap van Eik; Pierre van der Linden; Rick van der Linden

Trace was a Dutch progressive rock trio founded by Rick van der Linden in 1974 after leaving Ekseption. The band was formed in 1974 and released its debut album, "Trace," that same year. The band's music was characterized by complex arrangements and intricate instrumental work, and their compositions often featured a mix of rock, jazz, and classical influences. Trace released a total of three albums during their career. Trace was fairly popular in Europe, and they gained a loyal following among fans of progressive rock. However, they never achieved widespread commercial success and disbanded in the late 1970s, merging back into Ekseption. Despite this, the band's music has continued to be appreciated by fans of progressive rock.

== History ==
In 1973, after releasing their album entitled Trinity, the other members of Ekseption asked Rick van der Linden to leave the band. At this time Ekseption were quite famous which led Philips, their record-company, to give van der Linden the opportunity to find a new band.

In January 1974 van der Linden started rehearsals with Peter de Leeuwe (born 31 December 1947 died 4 February 2014, Haarlem), who had previously played drums with Ekseption. The pair split up again soon after, since van der Linden considered de Leeuwe to be lacking in skill. De Leeuwe was replaced in February by Pierre van der Linden (a second-cousin of Rick), who had left Focus in October 1973. To complete the trio, Rick asked Jaap van Eik (born 17 October 1944, The Hague), a self-taught musician considered to be one of the best Dutch bass players, to join the band. Originally named Ace (in the tradition of Cream and Flash to highlight their supergroup status), they had to change the name to Trace when they discovered a British band had already trademarked the name.

In May 1974 the trio recorded their first single, a prog rock version of Dizzy Gillespie's Tabu, backed by an original theme, Progress, which saw release in July 1974. On 9 September 1974 the group released its eponymous, first album. Their second album Birds was released in 1975, and featured future Marillion drummer Ian Mosley. A third album, The White Ladies, was released in 1976 with Rick van der Linden being supported by all of the former members of Ekseption except trumpeter Rein van den Broek. In 1978 van den Broek rejoined the group, which became Ekseption once again.

== Discography ==
- Trace (1974)
- Birds (1975)
- The White Ladies (1976)
