= Markus Strothmann =

Jazz Musician

Markus Strothmann is a German jazz drummer. He established himself in the European jazz scene and came to prominence as a jazz musician in 2009 with his own concert series. He has a "Master of Music" degree from the Artez Conservatory of Music in Enschede in the Netherlands. He teaches at the Artez Conservatory and at German music schools.

== History ==
For his master's degree, Strothmann researched and wrote about the network of jazz music in Europe, for which he visited and lived in London, Dublin and Brussels. He interviewed jazz personalities such as the heads of the jazz departments at the conservatoires, including The Royal Academy of Music and the Guildhall in London, and club managers.

These interviews, with concerts and lessons he took during his research, gave him an understanding of the structures of jazz music and performance across Europe. He was interviewed by Linley Hamilton of BBC radio and talked about the Transitions Organ Duo and his research activities. Strothmann started teaching at the Artez Conservatory of Music in Enschede after finishing his studies, specialising in jazz drumset and jazz combo for the “Minor Music” department. He also teaches at two music schools in Germany.

Strothmann plays gigs at high-profile jazz concerts such as “WDR Jazznacht” in Gutersloh and “Wacken”. He came to prominence as a jazz musician in 2009 with his own concert series, “Markus Strothmann meets...”, in which he played with European jazz personalities such as Nippy Noya, Norbert Gottschalk, Bart van Lier, and others. His project "Transitions Organ Duo", a Hammond/Drum duo with Dutch organist John Hondorp, combined the dynamic aspects of jazz music with the rawness of rock. Strothmann referred to this music as “Razz”.

On the Transitions album “No Idea” (2013), Jeanfrançois Prins (guitar) and Frederik Köster (trumpet, winner of the German Jazz Echo prize), joined Transitions on Strothmann's compositions “Emerald” and “No Idea”, and Prins’s composition "Futebol".
