= Jan Akkerman =

Dutch guitarist (born 1946)

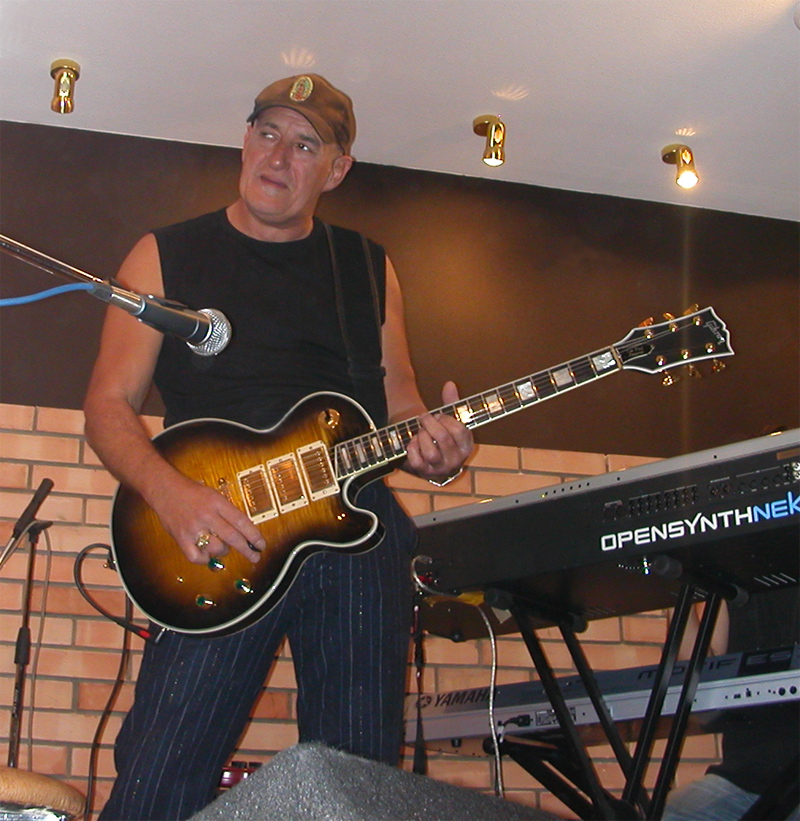
- Jan Akkerman in Russia, 2005

Background information
- Born: 24 December 1946 (age 79); Amsterdam, Netherlands
- Genres: Progressive rock; rock; blues rock; jazz rock
- Occupations: Musician, composer, producer
- Instruments: Guitar, lute, bass, keyboards, drums
- Years active: 1958–present
- Labels: Atlantic; EMIdisc; Sire; Atco
- Formerly of: Johnny and his Cellar Rockers, ZZ & the Maskers, The Hunters, Brainbox, Focus
- Website: www.janakkerman.com

Jan Akkerman (born 24 December 1946) is a Dutch guitarist. He first found international commercial success with the band Focus, which he co-founded with Thijs van Leer. After leaving Focus, he continued as a solo musician, adding jazz rock influences.

== Biography ==
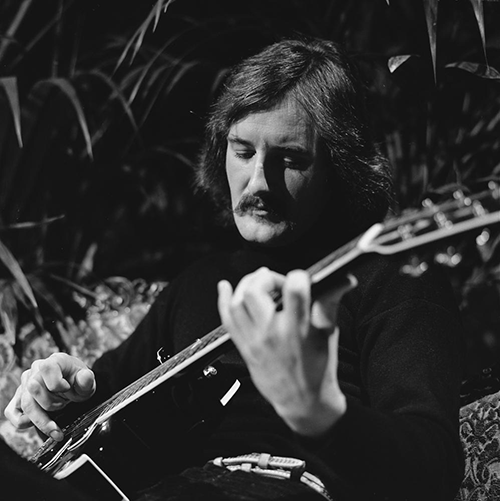
Akkerman performing on Dutch television (AVRO's TopPop) in 1974

The son of a scrap iron trader, Akkerman was born in Amsterdam. He started playing the accordion before turning to the guitar. Around age ten he took guitar lessons and his first single, with the Friendship Sextet, was released in 1960, when he was thirteen years old. Akkerman won a scholarship to study at the Amsterdam Music Lyceum for five years, developing his composition and arranging skills.

At fourteen he was in the rock band Johnny and his Cellar Rockers with his friend Pierre van der Linden. Both then joined The Hunters. After seeing a performance by classical guitarist Julian Bream, he became interested in renaissance music and the lute. He started the band Brainbox with Van der Linden, Kaz Lux, and André Reijnen. They recorded for Parlophone.

Akkerman joined the Thijs van Leer Trio in late 1969 which, as the nascent band Focus, was the pit band for the Dutch theatrical production of Hair (recorded as an album in 1969). Under the name Focus, the band explored progressive rock, an amalgam of classical, jazz, and rock music, and had hits in the seventies such as "Hocus Pocus" and "Sylvia". The band's albums Focus II (1971) and Focus 3 (1972) were certified gold by the RIAA in 1973 for selling 500,000 copies each. The live album At the Rainbow (1973) and the band's fourth outing, Hamburger Concerto (1974), were certified silver by the BPI for selling 60,000 copies each.

In late 1973 Akkerman was voted Best Guitar by readers of UK weekly Melody Maker, beating favorites such as John McLaughlin, Jimmy Page and Ritchie Blackmore. Akkerman and Focus were the only ones to challenge the bias toward American and British pop artists. He placed in third a year later in Melody Maker's polls, after Eric Clapton (#1) and Steve Howe (#2) from Yes. With manufacturer Framus he helped produce one of the first signature guitar models.

Atlantic released his solo album Tabernakel, on which he plays lute. His concept album Eli, recorded with Kaz Lux on vocals, won the Dutch Edison Award for best album in 1976. On the album, Akkerman experimented with a 12-string guitar tuned in parallel fifths. In the early 1980s he began to experiment with a guitar synthesizer, as on the album Oil in the Family. In 1985, he reunited Focus with Van Leer for an album and accompanying concert. The band reunited again in 1990 for the Dutch television program Goud van Oud (Old Gold). During the 1990s and in the 2000s he continued playing with his own band, and also as a solo musician, accompanied by pre-recorded computer-generated background (Roland synthesizers and Linn drums).

Akkerman was a session musician with André Hazes and worked with Alan Price, Herman Brood, Peter Banks, Jack Bruce, Charlie Byrd, Phil Collins, Paco de Lucía, Tony Scott, Ice-T, and B.B. King.

In 1992, he was involved in a serious car accident, but he resumed playing in 1993. In the late 1990s, after an absence of nearly 20 years, he was persuaded to tour the UK again. He wrote for the Dutch magazine GitaarPlus. In 2013, Akkerman released the album North Sea Jazz.

== Discography ==
- Talent for Sale (Imperial, 1968)
- Profile (Sire, 1972)
- Tabernakel (Atlantic, 1973)
- Eli (With Kaz Lux) (Atlantic, 1976)
- Jan Akkerman (Atlantic, 1977)
- Prism (With Tony Scott) (Polydor 1977)
- Live (Atlantic, 1978)
- Aranjuez (With Claus Ogerman) (CBS, 1978)
- Jan Akkerman 3 (Atlantic, 1979)
- Live In Kiel & Stuttgart 1979 (With Joachim Kühn)(Sandra Music Productions 1979)
- Transparental (With Kaz Lux) (Ariola, 1980)
- Oil in the Family (CNR, 1981)
- Pleasure Point (WEA, 1982)
- It Could Happen to You (Polydor, 1982)
- Can't Stand Noise (CBS, 1983)
- From the Basement (CBS, 1984)
- Focus (With Thijs Van Leer) (Vertigo, 1985)
- The Complete Guitarist (Charly, 1986)
- Heartware (Skydancer, 1987)
- The Noise of Art (I.R.S., 1990)
- Puccini's Café (EMI, 1993)
- Blues Hearts (EMI, 1994)
- Focus in Time (Patio Music, 1996)
- 10000 Clowns On A Rainy Day - Live 2CD (Patio Music 1997)
- Live At The Priory 1997 (Akkernet 1998)
- Blues Root (With Curtis Knight) (Universe, 1998)
- Passion (Roadrunner, 1999)
- Live at Alexanders (Akkernet, 1999)
- Jazzah! Mini Album (Akkernet 2000)
- Live in Viersen & Leverkusen 2001 - DVD (Alpha Centauri Entertainment 2003)
- C. U. (Coast to Coast, 2003)
- I'm In The Mood - Live 2002/2003 (No Label 2003)
- Fromage A Trois - Live Recorded 2006 (No Label 2006)
- Live In Concert - The Hague 2007 CD+2DVD (Alpha Centauri Entertainment 2007)
- Live In Concert 2007 (No Label 2007)
- Minor Details (Digimode Entertainment 2011)
- North Sea Jazz Legendary Concerts (Bob City CD+DVD 2011)
- Close Beauty (Music Theories, 2019)
- My Focus - Live Under The Rainbow (Music Theories, 2025)

== Awards and honours ==
- Knight of the Order of Orange-Nassau (Netherlands, 28 December 2012)
- Eddy Christiani Award (Netherlands, 11 April 2009)
- Golden Harp award (Netherlands, January 2005)

== See also ==
- Langcaster Guitars, a guitar type used by Akkerman

== Bibliography ==
- David Randall, In & out of focus : the music of Jan Akkerman and Focus, London : SAF Publishing, 2003, ISBN 0-946719-44-6
- Brigitte Tast, Hans-Juergen Tast: „be bop” - Die Wilhelmshöhe rockt. Disco und Konzerte in der Hölle. Verlag Gebrüder Gerstenberg GmbH & Co. kg, Hildesheim 2007, ISBN 978-3-8067-8589-0.
- Brigitte Tast, Hans-Juergen Tast: „be bop” - Rock-Tempel & Nachtasyl - Band 2 zur Legende. Hildesheim: Verlag Gebr. Gerstenberg 2009. ISBN 978-3-8067-8733-7.
