= Ekseption =

Dutch rock band

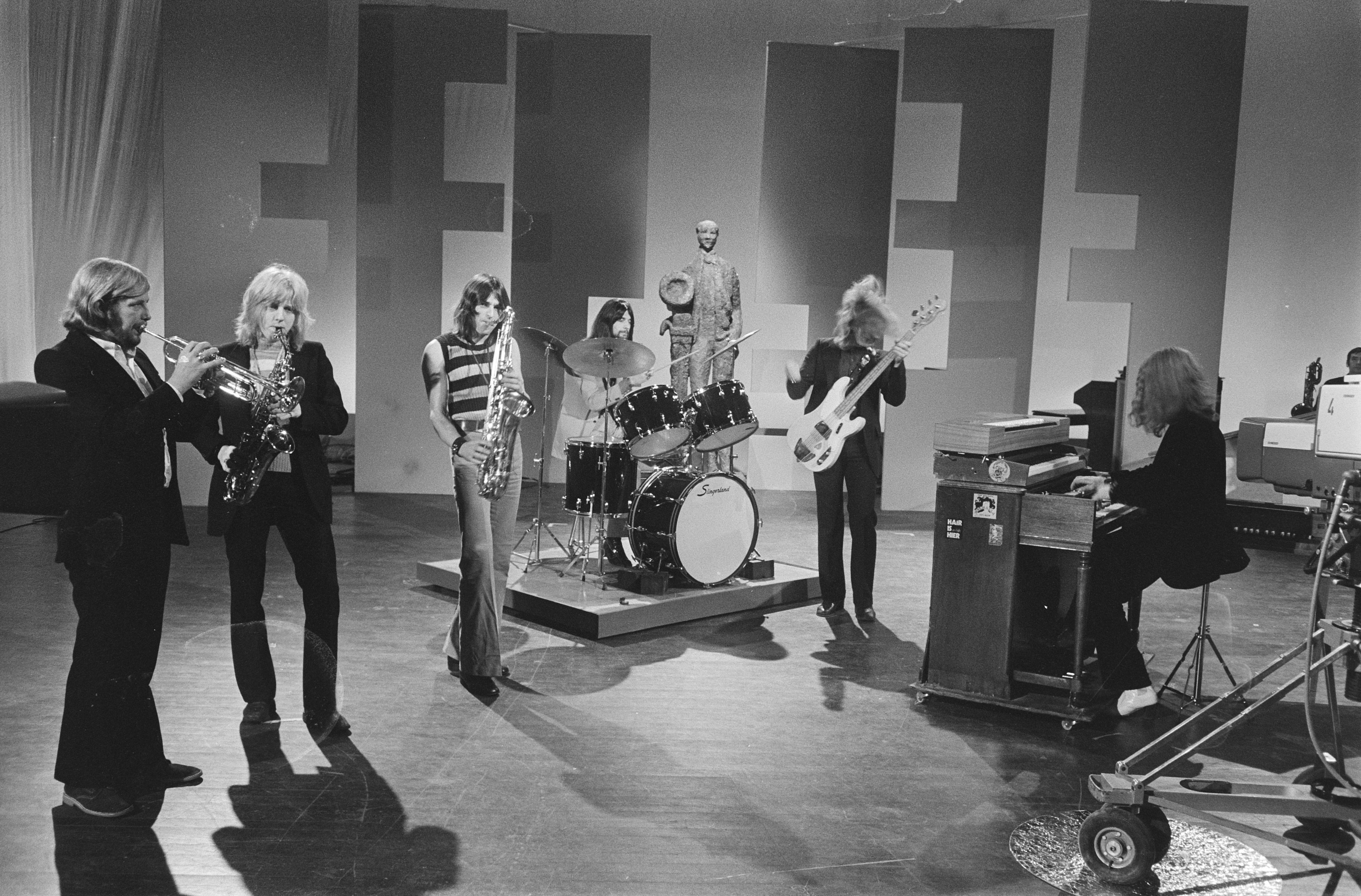
- Ekseption performing on Dutch TV show Voor de vuist weg in 1971

Background information
- Origin: Haarlem, Netherlands
- Genres: Progressive rock, classical crossover, jazz fusion
- Years active: 1967–1989
- Labels: Philips Records; Ariola Records; Carrere Records
- Spinoffs: Spin; Trace
- Past members: Personnel

Ekseption was a Dutch rock band active from 1967 to 1989, playing mostly-instrumental progressive rock and classical rock. The central character in the changing roster, and the only band member present on every album, was conservatory-trained trumpeter Rein van den Broek (10 September 1945 - 11 May 2015). The band saw some commercial success in the 1970s, having Dutch top ten hit singles with their adaptations of Beethoven's "Fifth" and Bach's "Air". The second album, Beggar Julia's Time Trip (1969), won the Dutch Edison Award for album of the year, and the first five albums all went gold.

== History ==
Ekseption grew out of the high-school band The Jokers, which van den Broek formed in 1958. They changed their name to The Incrowd (after the Ramsey Lewis song) before discovering that name was already taken. Finally they settled on the name Ekseption in 1967. The group played jazz, pop and R&B covers, but in 1969, shortly after keyboardist Rick van der Linden joined, they were impressed by a gig of The Nice, and van der Linden decided to concentrate on producing classical rock, modern re-interpretations of classical works for rock band. Most of their subsequent albums contain both original songs and re-interpreted classical pieces.

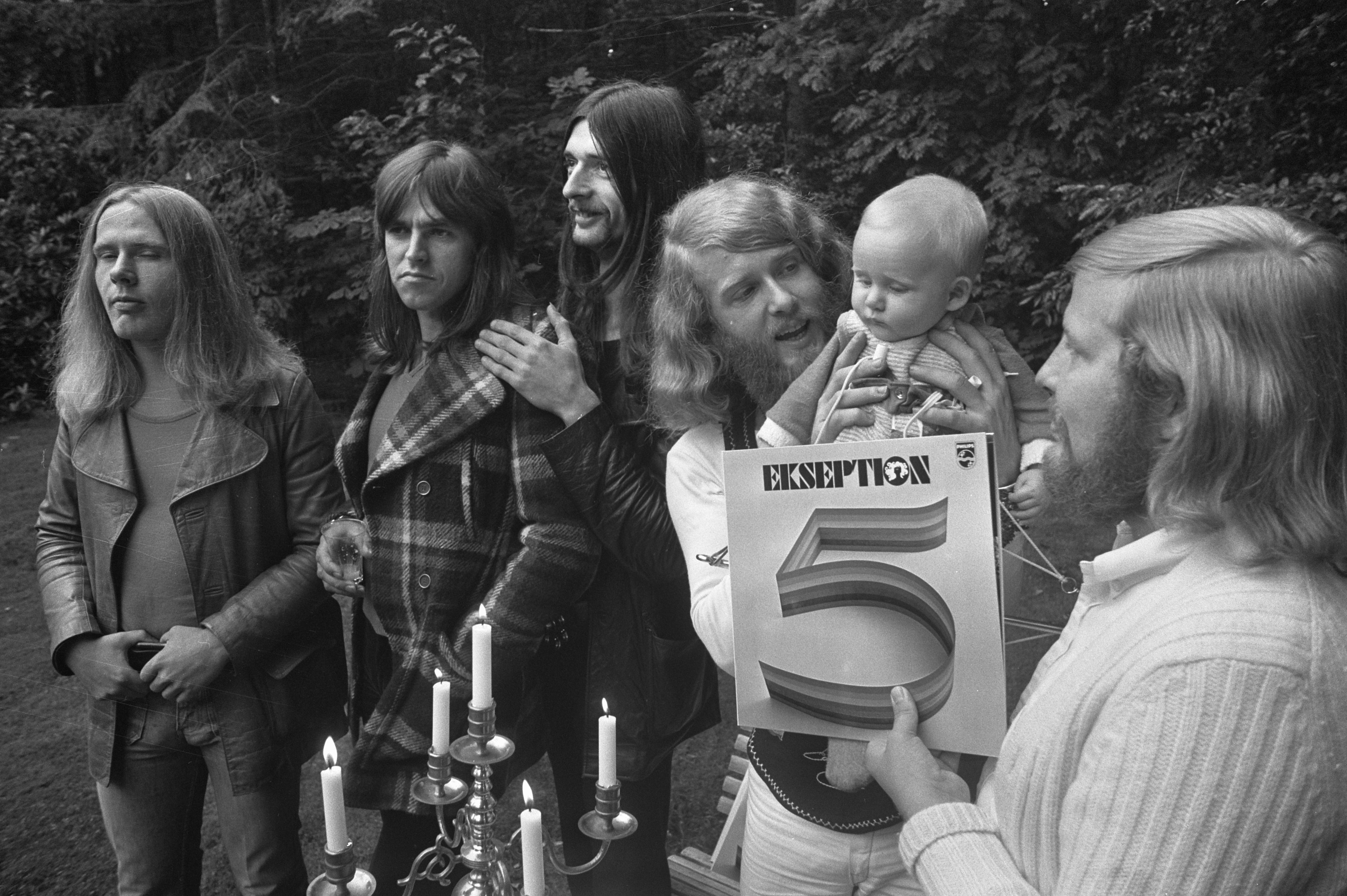
Ekseption 5 (1972)

It quickly became evident that van der Linden had assumed leadership of the group, and in a 1972 press release interview accompanying advance copies of the album Ekseption 5 he openly said so. After 1973's Trinity album he was asked to leave the group by his bandmates, and in the fall of that year he formed a new group Trace, during which time he was replaced by Dutch keyboardist Hans Jansen. Jansen took Ekseption in a jazzier direction, with two LPs of original compositions, but lackluster sales caused the band to break up in 1976. An offshoot band, named Spin, formed later that year and released two more albums, but success also eluded them. In 1978 Trace and Spin merged to become Ekseption once again. Periodic reunions (with new members) appeared until van der Linden's death in 2006.

== Personnel ==
- Rein van den Broek - trumpet, flugelhorn (1967-1989)
- Rick van der Linden - keyboards (1969–1973, 1978–1981)
- Cor Dekker - bass guitar (1969–1975)
- Peter de Leeuwe - drums, vocal (1969, 1971–1972)
- Rob Kruisman - saxophones, flute, vocal (1969)
- Huib van Kampen - solo guitar, tenor sax (1969)
- Dennis Whitbread (also Withbread - real name Dennis Witbraad) - drums (1970)
- Dick Remelink - saxophones, flutes (1970–1972)
- Michel van Dijk - vocals (1970) (later of Alquin)
- Linda van Dyck - vocals (1970)
- Erik van Lier - trombone, tuba (1970)
- Tony Vos - saxophones, production (1969–1971)
- Steve Allet (real name Koen Merkelbach) - vocals (1970)
- Jan Vennik - saxophones, flute (1973–1979)
- Pieter Voogt - drums (1973–1975)
- Hans Jansen (full name Johannes J. Jansen) - keyboards (1974–1977)
- Hans Hollestelle - guitar (1974–1976)
- Max Werner - drums (1981)
- Johan Slager - bass, guitar (1981)
- Jan Hollestelle - bass, synthesizers, cello (1976)
- Frans Muys van de Moer - bass (1989–1993)
- Cees Kranenburg - drums, percussion (1976)
- Inez van der Linden - vocals (2003)
- Mark Inneo - drums (2003)
- Bob Shields - guitar (2003)
- Meredith Nelson - bass guitar (2003)
- Peter Tong - keyboards (2003)

Spin (1976-1977)

- Rein van den Broek - trumpet
- Jan Vennik - sax, flute
- Hans Jansen - keyboards
- Hans Hollestelle - guitar
- Kees Kranenburg - drums
- Jan Hollestelle - bass

== Discography ==
Title and details	Notes
Ekseption: Credited to: Ekseption; Released: 1969	No. / Title / Length; 1. / "The 5th" (Ludwig van Beethoven) / 3:23; 2. / "Dharma For One" (I. Anderson, C. Bunker) / 3:28; 3. / "Little x plus" (Ekseption) / 3:31; 4. / "Sabre Dance" (Aram Khachaturian) / 3:46; 5. / "Air" (J.S. Bach) / 2:50; 6. / "Ritual Firedance" (Manuel de Falla) / 2:15; 7. / "Rhapsody in blue" (George Gershwin) / 4:00; 8. / "This here" (Bobby Timmons, Jon Hendricks) / 4:12; 9. / "Dance macabre opus 40" (Camille Saint-Saëns) / 2:21; 10. / "Canvas" (Brian Bennett) / 2:28
Beggar Julia's Time Trip: Credited to: Ekseption; Released: 1970	No. / Title / Length; 1. / "Ouverture" (R. van der Linden) / 3:22; 2. / "Prologue" (R. van der Linden, L. van Dijck) / 2:21; 3. / "Julia" (R. van der Linden, M. van Dijk) / 2:21; 4. / "Flying power" (R. van der Linden) / 0:31; 5. / "Adagio" (Tomaso Albinoni, Remo Giazotto) / 3:45; 6. / "Space I" (J.S. Bach) / 0:44; 7. / "Italian concerto" (J.S. Bach) / 4:59; 8. / "Concerto" (Pyotr Ilyich Tchaikovsky) / 3:52; 9. / "Space II" (R. van der Linden) / 0:26; 10. / "Pop giant" (R. van der Linden, M. van Dijk) / 3:54; 11. / "Space III" (R. van der Linden) / 0:22; 12. / "Feelings" (R. van der Linden) / 3:09; 13. / "Epilogue" (R. van der Linden, L. van Dijck) / 0:57; 14. / "Finale (a) Music for mind (b) Theme Julia" (R. van der Linden, M. van Dijk) / 3:55
Ekseption 3: Credited to: Ekseption; Released: 1970	No. / Title / Length; 1. / "Peace planet" (J.S. Bach) / 3:32; 2. / "B 612" (R. van der Linden, W. Luikinga) / 4:08; 3. / "Morning rose" (R. van der Linden, W. Luikinga) / 3:04; 4. / "Piece for symphonic and rock group in A minor (a) Part one: Passacaglia (b) Part two: Painting" (R. van der Linden, W. Luikinga) / 5:53; 5. / "The lamplighter" (J.S. Bach) / 3:01; 6. / "Bottle mind" (R. van der Linden) / 2:45; 7. / "On sunday they will kill the world" (S. Rachmaninoff, W. Luikinga) / 3:26; 8. / "Another history" (R. van der Linden, M. van Dijk) / 4:37; 9. / "Rondo" (L. van Beethoven) / 5:25
Ekseption 00.04: Credited to: Ekseption; Released: 1971	No. / Title / Length; 1. / "Ave Maria" (J.S. Bach, Charles Gounod) / 2:34; 2. / "Body party" (R. van der Linden) / 3:32; 3. / "Monlope" (Jimmy Smith, R. van der Linden) / 4:58; 4. / "Monkey dance" (R. van der Linden) / 2:41; 5. / "Choral" (R. van der Linden) / 4:02; 6. / "Partita No. 2 in C minor" (J.S. Bach) / 5:45; 7. / "Piccadilly sweet" (R. van der Linden) / 13:27
Ekseption 5: Credited to: Ekseption; Released: 1972	No. / Title / Length; 1. / "Introduction" (L. van Beethoven) / 0:35; 2. / "Siciliano (Siciliano from Sonata for flute and harpsichord in E, BWV 1031)" (J.S. Bach) / 3:20; 3. / "Vivace (Allegro from Concerto for violin and strings in A min, BWV 1041)" (J.S. Bach) / 5:16; 4. / "For example / For sure" (Keith Emerson, R. van der Linden (credited solely to Emerson on later CD editions)) / 9:03; 5. / "Virginal" (R. van der Linden) / 4:30; 6. / "A la turka (Alla Turca from Piano Sonata no.11 in A, K.331)" (Wolfgang Amadeus Mozart) / 2:26; 7. / "Midbar session" (R. van der Linden) / 10:03; 8. / "Pie" (R. van der Linden) / 1:30; 9. / "My son" (R. van der Linden) / 5:12; 10. / "Finale" (L. van Beethoven) / 3:40
Trinity: Credited to: Ekseption; Released: 1973	No. / Title / Length; 1. / "Toccata" (J.S. Bach) / 5:16; 2. / "The peruvian flute" (Traditional) / 8:04; 3. / "Dreams" (Tony Vos) / 1:32; 4. / "Smile" (R. van der Linden) / 2:53; 5. / "Lonely chase" (R. van der Linden) / 3:10; 6. / "Romance" (L. van Beethoven) / 3:30; 7. / "Improvisation" (R. van der Linden) / 9:01; 8. / "Meddle" (R. van der Linden) / 1:07; 9. / "Flight of the bumble bee" (Nikolai Rimsky-Korsakov) / 3:22; 10. / "Finale III" (R. van der Linden) / 2:50
Bingo: Credited to: Ekseption; Released: 1974	No. / Title / Length; 1. / "From Ekseption" (H. Jansen, J. Vennik) / 9:05; 2. / "Nightwalk" (J. Vennik) / 3:45; 3. / "Smokey sunset" (H. Jansen) / 5:11; 4. / "De fietser" (J. Vennik) / 1:51; 5. / "Sabre Dance" (Aram Khachaturian) / 2:56; 6. / "Brother rabbit" (R. van den Broek) / 3:26; 7. / "Sunny revival" (H. Jansen, J. Vennik) / 3:50; 8. / "The death of Ase" (Edvard Grieg) / 2:20; 9. / "Bingo-bingo" (H. Jansen, J. Vennik) / 6:40
Mindmirror: Credited to: Ekseption; Released: 1975	No. / Title / Length; 1. / "Pick Up the Pieces" (R. Ball, H. Stuart, A. Gorie, M. Duncan, R. McIntosh) / 6:05; 2. / "Bourree" (J.S. Bach) / 3:14; 3. / "Tramontane" (Piet Souer) / 4:17; 4. / "Electric swamp" (H. Hollestelle) / 4:04; 5. / "Ramses" (Ramses Shaffy) / 1:00; 6. / "Mindmirror" (J. Vennik, H. Jansen) / 17:28
Back to the Classics: Credited to: Ekseption; Released: 1976; Note: See below	No. / Title / Length; 1. / "Sonata in F" (Antonio Vivaldi) / 5:20; 2. / "Ave Maria" (Franz Schubert) / 4:53; 3. / "Eine kleine Nachtmusik (Serenade nr. 13 in G K.525)" (Wolfgang Amadeus Mozart) / 4:13; 4. / "Clarinet concerto in A" (W. A. Mozart) / 4:25; 5. / "Violin concerto in E minor, Op.64" (Felix Mendelssohn) / 5:00; 6. / "Have mercy on me (Erbarme Dich)" (J. S. Bach) / 6:57; 7. / "Flute sonata nr.5 in F" (George Frideric Händel) / 4:53; 8. / "Theme from Abdelazer" (Henry Purcell) / 3:58; 9. / "The Moldau (Ma Vlast)" (Bedřich Smetana) / 6:51
Spin: Credited to: Spin; Released: 1976	No. / Title / Length; 1. / "Grasshopper" (Hans Jansen, Jan Vennik) / 4:39; 2. / "Spinning" (Jan Hollestelle) / 4:03; 3. / "Excenter" (Jan Vennik) / 5:18; 4. / "Sea and Seasons" (Jan Hollestelle) / 4:57; 5. / "Little bitch" (Jan Hollestelle) / 4:57; 6. / "Sunday afternoon's dream" (Jan Hollestelle) / 4:57; 7. / "Flat tyre" (Jan Hollestelle) / 3:32; 8. / "Beautiful Queenie" (Hans Jansen) / 4:37
Whirlwind: Credited to: Spin; Released: 1977	No. / Title / Length; 1. / "Tarantula" / 5:00; 2. / "Baby's delight" / 5:35; 3. / "Dance of the sea-gull" / 4:20; 4. / "Telegraphcanyon-roadrunner" / 4:15; 5. / "Super B" / 5:13; 6. / "Yellow kites" / 4:07; 7. / "You're a clown" / 5:57; 8. / "T-Ford two" / 5:35
Ekseption '78: Credited to: Ekseption; Released: 1978	No. / Title / Length; 1. / "Again" (J.S. Bach) / 2:22; 2. / "Your home" (R. van der Linden) / 4:47; 3. / "Wild flower" (R. van der Linden, R. van den Broek) / 3:17; 4. / "Signal" (R. van der Linden, R. van den Broek) / 4:10; 5. / "Pearl" (G. F. Händel) / 2:22; 6. / "Thoughts" (R. van den Broek) / 3:53; 7. / "Summertime" (G. Gershwin) / 2:20; 8. / "Nocturne" (J.S. Bach) / 3:35; 9. / "Impromptu" (F. Schubert) / 2:48; 10. / "The cat" (Lalo Schiffrin) / 3:19; 11. / "Jesu joy" (J.S. Bach) / 3:02; 12. / "Faith" (R. van der Linden) / 3:21
Cum Laude: Credited to: Rick van der Linden + Rein van den Broek; Released: 1979	No. / Title / Length; 1. / "Jesu Meine Freude" (J.S. Bach) / 3:48; 2. / "Ave Maria" (Ch. Gounod, J.S. Bach) / 2:37; 3. / "Lord's Prayer" (trad.) / 3:43; 4. / "Song of Joy" (L. van Beethoven) / 2:49; 5. / "I Don't Know How To Love Him" (Andrew Lloyd Webber, Tim Rice) / 3:44; 6. / "Ave Jesus (CD bonus track)" (R. van der Linden, R. van den Broek) / 4:08; 7. / "Le Coucou (CD bonus track)" (R. van der Linden, R. van den Broek) / 2:19; 8. / "Oh Haupt Voll Blut Und Wunden" (J.S. Bach) / 3:11; 9. / "Jesu Joy of Man's Desiring" (J.S. Bach) / 3:18; 10. / "Ave Verum" (W.A. Mozart) / 2:32; 11. / "Finale: Dank U, Improvisation, Synfonia" (Martin G. Schneider, R. van der Linden, R. van den Broek, C. Saint-Saens) / 3:02
Dance Macabre: Credited to: Ekseption; Released: 1981	No. / Title / Length; 1. / "The Fifth Symphony" (L. van Beethoven) / 3:02; 2. / "Italian Concerto" (J.S. Bach) / 2:50; 3. / "Air" (J.S. Bach) / 4:07; 4. / "Rhapsody In Blue" (G. Gershwin) / 4:06; 5. / "Peace Planet" (J.S. Bach) / 3:26; 6. / "Sabre Dance" (A. Khatchaturian) / 4:06; 7. / "Concerto" (P.I Tchaikowsky) / 4:06; 8. / "Danse De Feu" (M. De Falla) / 2:46; 9. / "Adagio" (A. Albinoni, R. Giazotto) / 3:40; 10. / "Dance Macabre" (C. Saint-Saëns) / 2:20; 11. / "Haydn" (J. Haydn) / 2:51; 12. / "Conchorus" (R. van der Linden) / 4:45
Ekseption '89: Credited to: Ekseption; Released: 1989	No. / Title / Length; 1. / "Spooky" (Ludwig van Beethoven) / 3:35; 2. / "Ekseptional" (J.S. Bach) / 3:30; 3. / "Pure" (J.S. Bach) / 3:35; 4. / "Air" (J.S. Bach) / 4:07; 5. / "Flying fingers" (R. Korsakov) / 3:59; 6. / "Happiness" (F. Schubert) / 2:44; 7. / "The artists" (J.S. Bach) / 3:02; 8. / "Haydn" (Joseph Haydn) / 3:05; 9. / "Just for you" (G.F. Händel) / 2:28; 10. / "Drawbars" (J.S. Bach) / 2:52; 11. / "Jola" (G.F. Händel) / 5:04; 12. / "The Fifth" (L. van Beethoven) / 3:17; 13. / "Marlene" (F. Schubert) / 3:23; 14. / "Peace planet" (J.S. Bach) / 3:29; 15. / "Harmony" (J.S. Bach) / 2:39; 16. / "A believe (Jesu, joy of man's desiring)" (J.S. Bach) / 3:07; 17. / "My pianoman" (J.S. Bach) / 2:38

- Note: Back to the Classics is the only Ekseption album which does not list personnel. Instead the liner notes say, "The pieces were recorded by musicians who were with EKSEPTION between 1969 and 1975, joined by Holland's best session musicians to replace those members who had to be excluded because of contractual obligations". Since this record was recorded during the time when all the principal members were involved with either Trace or Spin, the only Ekseption members appearing must have been backing musicians.

=== Compilations, live albums, reunion albums ===
- Ekseptional Classics - the Best of Ekseption (1973)
- Ekseption Witte Album
- Motive
- Greatest Hits - Classics (1975)
- Best of Ekseption
- Classic in Pop
- Pop Lions
- Reflection (1976)
- Ekseption Live at Idssteiner Schloss (1978)
- Past and Present (1983)
- Ekseption Plays Bach (1989)
- Greatest Hits (1990)
- With Love From Ekseption (1993)
- The 5th: Greatest Hits (1998)
- The Reunion (1994, live)
- Selected Ekseption (1999)
- With a smile (2000)
- Air (2001)
- The Best from Classics (2001)
- The Best of Ekseption (2002)
- The Universal Master Collection (2003)
- Live in Germany (2003)
- 3 Originals (2004)
- Rick van der Linden: An Ekseptional Trace (2007)
- The Last Live Concert Tapes (2009)
- Hollands Glorie (2009)

=== Videography ===
- The Story of Ekseption (DVD, PAL format, 2010)
