= Rick van der Linden =

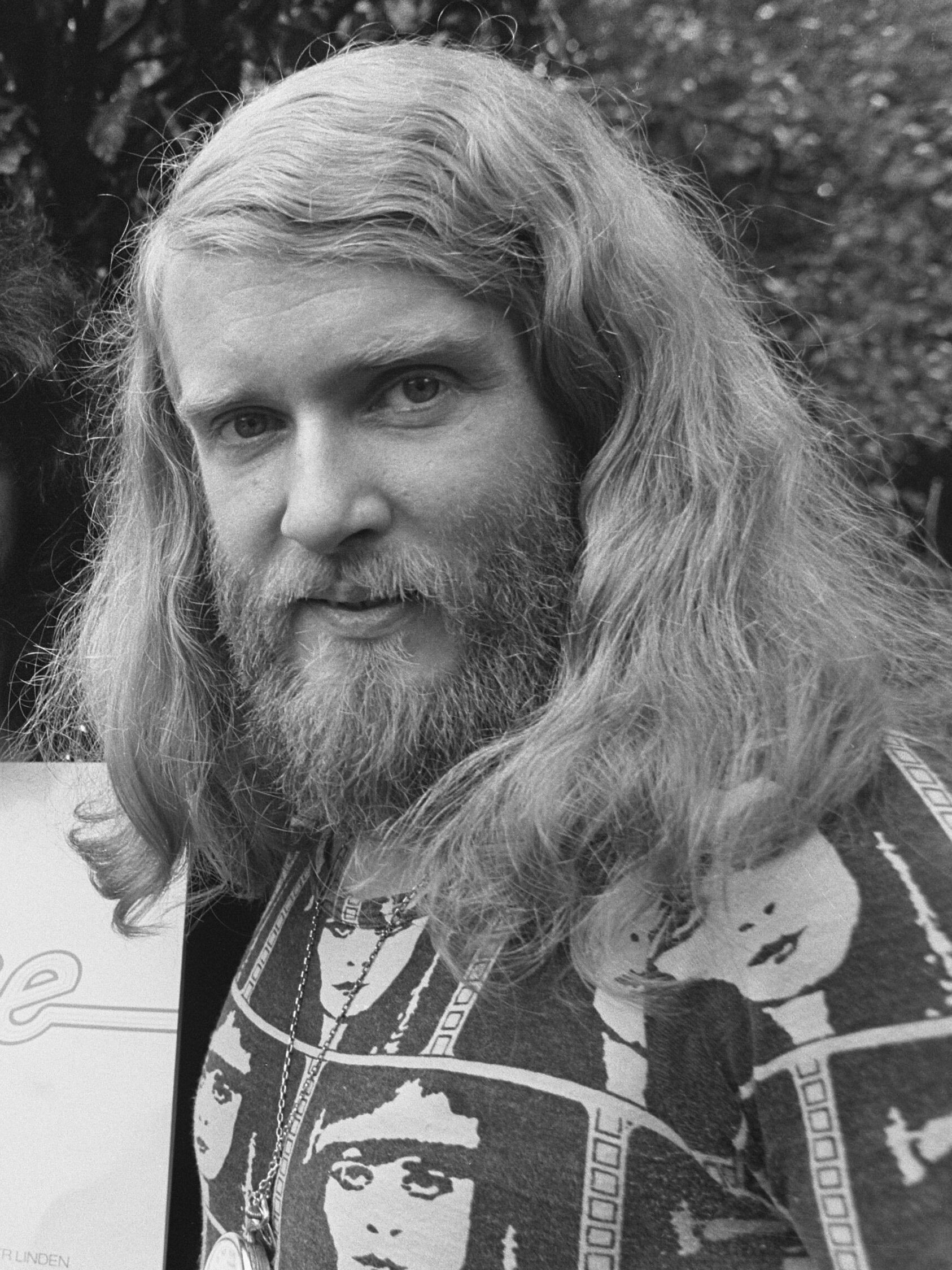
- Van der Linden in 1974

Background information
- Born: 5 August 1946; Badhoevedorp, Netherlands
- Died: 22 January 2006 (aged 59) Groningen, Netherlands
- Genres: Rock; progressive rock; symphonic rock
- Occupation: Musician
- Instrument: Keyboards
- Years active: 1967–2006
- Labels: Philips, Atco
- Formerly of: Ekseption, Trace
- Website: Official website

Rick van der Linden (5 August 1946, Badhoevedorp, North Holland – 22 January 2006, Groningen) was a Dutch composer and keyboardist. Van der Linden first gained fame as a member of Ekseption, but he played in several other bands including most notably Trace, as well as solo. Van der Linden was best known for his reworkings of classical music in a pop music domain, often with jazz improvisations.

== History ==
Rick van der Linden was born in the village of Badhoevedorp, not far from Amsterdam, the second of five van der Linden children. His family moved when Rick was only 5 weeks old to Rotterdam, where they lived until 1957. He started piano lessons at age 7 but gave them up two years later because he wasn't enjoying them. When he was 11, his family moved again, to Haarlem where van der Linden attended the Triniteitslyceum. At 13, his father convinced Rick to try the piano again, so he was enrolled at the Haarlem School of Music. Two years later he became a private pupil of the Piet Vincent. At 17, he entered the Haarlem Conservatory where Aad Broersen and Albert de Klerk tutored him in the organ. Van der Linden finished his studies two years later and in 1965 passed exams at the Royal Conservatory in The Hague, winning honours in piano, organ, harmony and counterpoint. Van der Linden thought he might become a teacher at the Haarlem Conservatory.

Meanwhile, in the early 1960s, van der Linden fell in love with rock and roll, along with jazz and ballet music. While still a student he took a job in a nightclub bar, playing foxtrots, boogie-woogie, ragtime, film soundtracks, blues, tango, pop, Strauss waltzes and cabaret tunes while studying the classical masters during the day. He also found time to write music for several local ballet ensembles. In 1964, he formed his first band, a piano trio, and later a brass jazz septet which played for fun and rehearsal only (never playing any gigs). After graduation, van der Linden joined the Occasional Swing Combo, a professional jazz septet which played extensively. Simultaneously, he was also touring the Netherlands playing with symphony orchestras, and appearing as a soloist in concerti by Bach, Rachmaninov, Beethoven and Mendelssohn.

In 1966, the Occasional Swing Combo shared a stage with Rein van den Broek's jazz combo The InCrowd, and van den Broek was impressed with the young keyboardist. He offered van der Linden the chance to join The InCrowd, which van der Linden accepted.

Soon after, they discovered there was another Dutch band with the name "The In Crowd", so they changed their name to Ekseption. In 1968, van der Linden attended a Rotterdam concert by The Nice, Keith Emerson's neo-classical rock trio, where they played a version of Bach's Brandenburg Concertos. Van der Linden was inspired to combine his love of classical music with modern presentation (see main article Ekseption).

Ekseption toured heavily, mainly through Europe, from 1968 to 1974, and won critical acclaim. Van der Linden left Ekseption in 1974 to form Trace, a smaller rock trio along the lines of Emerson, Lake & Palmer. In 1978, he returned to Ekseption for the first in a series of reunions, each less successful than the previous. He also played with Mistral (1977–1980, with Robbie van Leeuwen (ex-Shocking Blue)) and Cum Laude (1980–1989). He released several solo albums, most reworkings of classical music in the Ekseption style. He performed session work with artists such as Jan Akkerman, Joachim Kuhn, Deep Purple, Phil Collins, Vangelis, Jack Lancaster and Brand X. From 2002 to 2005 Ekseption was composed of primarily Canadian members. Van der Linden is quoted as saying that this was his favourite period of his music career as these band members worked well with each other and created a family-like atmosphere. For the first time, van der Linden was able to tour Canada as well as previous locations in Europe.

Rick was the second-cousin of Focus drummer Pierre van der Linden.

== Marriages ==
His first wife was Penney de Jager, a ballerina/burlesque dancer whom he married 5 August 1971. A son (Rick Jr.) was born in 1972, but the couple eventually divorced in 1983. On 17 May 1989 van der Linden married Inez Zwart who was also a band manager and singer in Ekseption as well as in many of Rick's solo works. After van der Linden's death, Zwart continues to bring his music to the public.

== Death ==
Van der Linden had long suffered from diabetes with following eyesight impairment, and in 2005 had a successful eye surgery. On 19 November 2005 he suffered from a stroke which resulted in partial paralysis. He died on 22 January 2006 in Groningen, and was cremated in Assen. Almost 500 people attended his memorial service in Hoogeveen.

== Discography ==
=== With Ekseption ===
- Ekseption (1969)
- Beggar Julia's time trip (1970)
- Ekseption 3 (1970)
- Ekseption 00.04 (1971)
- Ekseption 5 (1972)
- Trinity (1973)
- Ekseption '78 (1978)
- Dance Macabre (1981)
- Ekseption '89 (1989)

==== Compilations, live albums, reunion albums ====
- Ekseptional Classics - the Best of Ekseption (1973)
- Ekseption Witte Album
- Motive
- Greatest Hits - Classics (1975)
- Best of Ekseption
- Classic in Pop
- Pop Lions
- Reflection (1976)
- Ekseption Live at Idssteiner Schloss (1978)
- Past and Present (1983)
- Ekseption Plays Bach (1989)
- Greatest Hits (1990)
- With Love From Ekseption (1993)
- The 5th: Greatest Hits (1998)
- The Reunion (1994, live)
- Selected Ekseption (1999)
- With a smile (2000)
- Air (2001)
- The Best from Classics (2001)
- The Best of Ekseption (2002)
- The Universal Master Collection (2003)
- Live in Germany (2003)
- 3 Originals (2004)
- Rick van der Linden: An Ekseptional Trace (2007)
- The Last Live Concert Tapes (2009)
- Hollands Glorie (2009)
- The Story of Ekseption (DVD, PAL format, 2010)

=== With Trace ===
- Trace (May 1974)
- Birds (1975)
- The White Ladies (1976)

=== With Cum Laude ===
- Cum Laude 1 (1980)
- Cum Laude 2 (1987)

=== Solo ===
- Plays Albinoni, Bach, Handel (1976)
- GX1 (played entirely on the Yamaha GX-1 synthesizer, 1977)
- Night of Doom (soundtrack, 1978)
- Wild Connections (with Jack Lancaster, 1979)
- Variations (with Cathalin Tercolea, 1979)
- Solo (1981)
- Norfolk Line (with Cathalin Tercolea, 1982)
- Old Friends, New Friends (1985)
- Rainbow Dubbel (1997)
