= Al Jarreau discography =

- Studio albums: 17
- Live albums: 8
- Compilation albums: 6
- Singles: 60

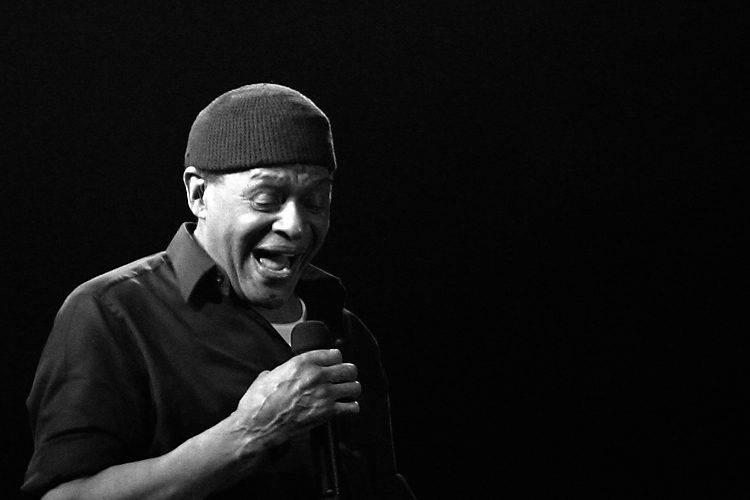
Al Jarreau

This is the discography of American singer and musician Al Jarreau.

== Albums ==
=== Studio albums ===
Title	Album details	Peak chart positions										Certifications
Title	Album details	US	US R&B	US Jazz	AUS	GER	NL	NOR	SWE	SWI	UK	Certifications
We Got By	Released: August 1975; Label: Reprise; Formats: LP, MC	209	—	—	—	—	—	—	—	—	—	
Glow	Released: June 15, 1976; Label: Reprise; Formats: LP, MC	132	30	—	—	41	—	20	—	—	—	
All Fly Home	Released: September 1978; Label: Warner Bros.; Formats: LP, MC, 8-track	78	27	—	—	—	—	—	—	—	—	
This Time	Released: June 1980; Label: Warner Bros.; Formats: LP, MC	27	6	—	—	—	—	16	—	—	—	US: Gold
Breakin' Away	Released: June 30, 1981; Label: Warner Bros.; Formats: LP, MC, 8-track	9	1	—	80	—	3	9	—	—	60	NL: Gold; US: Platinum
1965	Released: July 1982; Label: Bainbridge; Formats: LP, MC; Recorded in 1965	—	—	—	—	—	—	—	—	—	—	
Jarreau	Released: March 28, 1983; Label: Warner Bros.; Formats: LP, MC	13	4	—	50	25	15	8	30	—	39	US: Platinum
High Crime	Released: October 29, 1984; Label: Warner Bros.; Formats: CD, LP, MC	49	12	—	65	42	46	13	29	27	81	US: Gold
L Is for Lover	Released: September 8, 1986; Label: Warner Bros.; Formats: CD, LP, MC	81	30	—	65	7	62	—	34	13	45	US: Gold
Heart's Horizon	Released: November 15, 1988; Label: Reprise; Formats: CD, LP, MC	75	11	—	—	33	—	19	—	—	—	US: Gold
Heaven and Earth	Released: June 22, 1992; Label: Reprise; Formats: Cd, LP, MC	105	30	—	—	59	75	—	—	32	—	
Tomorrow Today	Released: March 7, 2000; Label: GRP; Formats: CD, MC	137	43	2	—	28	93	—	—	76	—	GER: Gold
All I Got	Released: September 16, 2002; Label: GRP; Formats: CD, MC	137	43	4	—	48	—	—	—	—	—	
Accentuate the Positive	Released: August 3, 2004; Label: Verve; Formats: CD, MC	—	—	6	—	88	—	—	—	91	—	
Givin' It Up	Released: October 24, 2006; Label: Concord/Monster Music; Formats: CD, MC; With George Benson	58	14	1	—	59	—	—	—	—	—	
Christmas	Released: October 14, 2008; Label: Rhino; Formats: CD	—	46	5	—	—	—	—	—	—	—	
My Old Friend: Celebrating George Duke	Released: August 5, 2014; Label: Concord; Formats: CD	69	—	1	—	84	50	—	—	—	—	
"—" denotes releases that did not chart or were not released in that territory.

=== Live albums ===
Title	Album details	Peak chart positions					
Title	Album details	US	US R&B	US Jazz	GER	NOR	SWE
Look to the Rainbow	Released: May 27, 1977; Label: Warner Bros.; Formats: 2xLP, MC	49	19	—	—	20	—
In Concert – Live at London's Wembley Arena	Released: 1984; Label: Westwood One; Formats: LP	—	—	—	—	—	—
In London	Released: August 1985; Label: Warner Bros.; Formats: CD, LP, MC	125	55	—	58	—	—
Tenderness	Released: May 24, 1994; Label: Reprise; Formats: CD, MC	114	25	2	76	—	42
Live at the Half/Note 1965 Volume 1	Released: 2011; Label: BPM; Formats: CD	—	—	—	—	—	—
Al Jarreau and the Metropole Orkest Live	Released: June 19, 2012; Label: Concord; Formats: CD	—	—	—	—	—	—
Live at Montreux 1993	Released: April 15, 2016; Label: Eagle/Universal; Formats: CD	—	—	—	—	—	—
Ellington	Released: November 1, 2024; Label: ACT; Formats: LP, CD, digital; With NDR Bigband	—	—	—	—	—	—
Wow! Live at the Childe Harold	Released: December 6, 2024; Label: Resonance Records/ Harmonia Mundi; Formats: CD, LP, Digital	—	—	—	—	—	—
"—" denotes releases that did not chart or were not released in that territory.

=== Compilation albums ===
Title	Album details	Peak chart positions	
Title	Album details	US Jazz	GER
Best of Al Jarreau	Released: November 5, 1996; Label: Warner Bros.; Formats: CD, MC	9	91
The Masters	Released: January 5, 1999; Label: Eagle; Formats: CD	—	—
Love Songs	Released: January 28, 2008; Label: Rhino; Formats: CD	11	—
The Very Best Of: An Excellent Adventure	Released: September 29, 2009; Label: Rhino/Warner Bros./Reprise; Formats: CD	18	—
Original Album Series	Released: June 13, 2011; Label: Rhino; Formats: 5xCD box set	—	—
Al Jarreau Works	Released: March 24, 2021; Label: Warner Music/Rhino; Formats: 2xCD+DVD; Japan-only release	—	—
"—" denotes releases that did not chart or were not released in that territory.

== Singles ==
Title	Year	Peak chart positions										Album
Title	Year	US	US AC	US R&B	US Smooth Jazz	AUS	BEL (FL)	CAN	CAN AC	NL	UK	Album
"I'm Not Afraid"	1964	—	—	—	—	—	—	—	—	—	—	Non-album singles
"Shake Up"	1964	—	—	—	—	—	—	—	—	—	—	Non-album singles
"One Holy Mornin'" (Australia-only release)	1971	—	—	—	—	—	—	—	—	—	—	Non-album singles
"Lock All the Gates" (Europe-only release)	1975	—	—	—	—	—	—	—	—	—	—	We Got By
"Your Song"	1976	—	—	—	—	—	—	—	—	—	—	Glow
"Fire and Rain" (Germany-only release)	1976	—	—	—	—	—	—	—	—	—	—	Glow
"Rainbow in Your Eyes"	1976	—	—	92	—	—	—	—	—	—	—	Glow
"Take Five"	1977	—	—	91	—	—	—	—	—	—	—	Look to the Rainbow
"We Got By"	1977	—	—	—	—	—	—	—	—	—	—	Look to the Rainbow
"Thinkin' About It Too"	1978	—	—	55	—	—	—	—	—	—	—	All Fly Home
"All"	1979	—	—	—	—	—	—	—	—	—	—	All Fly Home
"Never Givin' Up"	1980	102	—	26	—	—	—	—	—	—	—	This Time
"Gimme What You Got"	1980	—	—	63	—	—	—	—	—	—	—	This Time
"Distracted"	1980	—	—	61	—	—	—	—	—	—	—	This Time
"One Good Turn"	1981	—	—	—	—	—	—	—	—	—	—	In Harmony – A Sesame Street Record
"We're in This Love Together"	1981	15	6	6	—	—	—	42	1	—	55	Breakin' Away
"Breakin' Away"	1981	43	30	25	—	—	—	—	20	—	—	Breakin' Away
"Closer to Your Love" (UK-only release)	1981	—	—	—	—	—	—	—	—	—	—	Breakin' Away
"Roof Garden" (Europe-only release)	1981	—	—	—	—	—	4	—	—	3	—	Breakin' Away
"Our Love" (UK-only release)	1982	—	—	—	—	—	—	—	—	—	—	Breakin' Away
"Teach Me Tonight"	1982	70	19	51	—	—	—	—	—	—	—	Breakin' Away
"Your Precious Love" (with Randy Crawford)	1982	102	—	16	—	—	—	—	—	—	—	Casino Lights (various artists live album)
"Mornin'"	1983	21	2	6	—	82	26	—	3	24	28	Jarreau
"Boogie Down"	1983	77	—	9	—	—	30	—	—	23	63	Jarreau
"Trouble in Paradise"	1983	63	10	66	—	—	—	—	7	—	36	Jarreau
"Black and Blues" (Europe-only release)	1983	—	—	—	—	—	—	—	—	—	—	Jarreau
"Love Is Waiting" (UK-only release)	1983	—	—	—	—	—	—	—	—	—	—	Jarreau
"The Christmas Song (Chestnuts Roasting on an Open Fire)"	1983	—	—	—	—	—	—	—	—	—	—	Non-album single
"After All"	1984	69	6	26	—	—	—	—	5	—	—	High Crime
"Let's Pretend"	1984	—	—	—	—	—	—	—	—	—	—	High Crime
"Raging Waters"	1985	—	—	42	—	—	—	—	—	—	—	High Crime
"High Crime" (Europe-only release)	1985	—	—	—	—	—	—	—	—	—	—	High Crime
"Day by Day" (with Shakatak)	1985	—	—	—	—	—	—	—	—	46	53	City Rhythm (by Shakatak)
"The Music of Goodbye" (with Melissa Manchester)	1986	—	16	—	—	—	—	—	18	—	—	Out of Africa (soundtrack)
"Says" (France-only release)	1986	—	—	—	—	—	—	—	—	—	—	L Is for Lover
"Real Tight" (Germany-only release)	1986	—	—	—	—	—	—	—	—	—	—	L Is for Lover
"L Is for Lover"	1986	—	—	42	—	—	—	—	—	—	—	L Is for Lover
"Tell Me What I Gotta Do"	1986	—	—	37	—	—	—	—	—	99	98	L Is for Lover
"Give a Little More Lovin'"	1987	—	—	—	—	—	—	—	—	—	—	L Is for Lover
"Moonlighting (Theme)"	1987	23	1	32	—	64	—	38	1	—	8	Moonlighting (soundtrack)
"Since I Fell for You"	1987	—	10	—	—	—	—	—	3	—	—	Moonlighting (soundtrack)
"I Must Have Been a Fool"	1988	—	—	—	—	—	—	—	—	—	—	Heart's Horizon
"So Good"	1988	—	27	2	—	—	—	—	—	—	—	Heart's Horizon
"All or Nothing at All"	1989	—	40	59	—	—	—	—	—	—	—	Heart's Horizon
"All of My Love"	1989	—	—	69	—	—	—	—	—	—	—	Heart's Horizon
"Heaven and Earth"	1992	—	—	—	—	—	—	—	—	—	—	Heaven and Earth
"Blue Angel"	1992	—	—	74	—	—	—	—	—	—	—	Heaven and Earth
"It's Not Hard to Love You"	1992	—	—	36	—	—	—	—	—	—	—	Heaven and Earth
"What You Do to Me"	1993	—	—	—	—	—	—	—	—	—	—	Heaven and Earth
"Compared to What"	1996	—	—	—	—	—	—	—	—	—	—	Best of Al Jarreau
"Smile" (with Gregor Prächt; Austria-only release)	1997	—	—	—	—	—	—	—	—	—	—	Non-album single
"Just to Be Loved"	2000	—	26	—	—	—	—	—	—	—	—	Tomorrow Today
"Morning" (with George Benson)	2006	—	—	—	1	—	—	—	—	—	—	Givin' It Up
"Ordinary People" (with George Benson)	2007	—	—	—	23	—	—	—	—	—	—	Givin' It Up
"Winter Wonderland"	2009	—	—	—	21	—	—	—	—	—	—	Christmas
"Double Face" (Eumir Deodato featuring Al Jarreau)	2012	—	—	—	23	—	—	—	—	—	—	The Crossing (by Eumir Deodato)
"Bring Me Joy" (featuring George Duke and Boney James)	2014	—	—	—	5	—	—	—	—	—	—	My Old Friend: Celebrating George Duke
"SomeBossa (Summer Breezin')" (featuring Gerald Albright)	2015	—	—	—	11	—	—	—	—	—	—	My Old Friend: Celebrating George Duke
"Big Light" (with Melissa Manchester featuring Liam Keegan)	2015	—	—	—	—	—	—	—	—	—	—	You Gotta Love the Life (by Melissa Manchester)
"All One" (Alexandra Jackson featuring Al Jarreau with Larry Williams & Oscar Castro-Neves)	2018	—	—	—	17	—	—	—	—	—	—	Legacy & Alchemy (by Alexandra Jackson)
"—" denotes releases that did not chart or were not released in that territory.

== Other ==
=== Soundtrack inclusions ===
- 1982: "Girls Know How", in the film Night Shift (Warner Bros)
- 1984: "Boogie Down", in the film Breakin' (Warner Bros)
- 1984: "Million Dollar Baby", in the film City Heat (Warner Bros)
- 1985: "Moonlighting (theme)" and "Since I Fell for You", in the television show Moonlighting (Universal)
- 1986: "The Music of Goodbye", duet with Melissa Manchester, in the film Out of Africa (MCA Records)
- 1989: "Never Explain Love", in the film Do the Right Thing (Motown)
- 1992: "Blue Skies", in the film Glengarry Glen Ross (New Line Cinema)
- 1992: "Heaven Is", in the film The Magic Voyage (Zweites Deutsches Fernsehen)
- 1998: "My Life and My Love", in the film The Secret of NIMH 2: Timmy to the Rescue (MGM)

=== Guest appearances ===
- 1974: "If I Ever Lose This Heaven" from Body Heat/Quincy Jones (A&M) (Jarreau provides background scat and vocal percussion.)
- 1978: "Hot News Blues" from Secret Agent/Chick Corea (Polydor)
- 1979: "Little Sunflower" from The Love Connection/Freddie Hubbard (Columbia)
- 1980: "One Good Turn" from In Harmony: A Sesame Street Record/Various Artists (Warner Bros.)
- 1982: "Your Precious Love (w/Randy Crawford)" from Casino Lights: Recorded Live At Montreux, Switzerland/Various Artists (Warner Bros.)
- 1983: "Bet Cha Say That to All the Girls" from Bet Cha Say That to All the Girls/Sister Sledge (Cotillion)
- 1984: "Edgartown Groove" from Send Me Your Love/Kashif (Arista)
- 1985: "We Are the World" from We Are the World/USA for Africa (Columbia) US No. 1, R&B No. 1 UK No. 1
- 1986: "Since I Fell for You" from Double Vision/Bob James & David Sanborn (Warner Bros.)
- 1987: "Day by Day" from City Rhythms/Shakatak
- 1989: "Somehow Our Love Survives" from Spellbound/Joe Sample (Warner Bros.)
- 1997: "Girl from Ipanema" and "Waters of March" from A Twist of Jobim/Lee Ritenour (GRP)
- 1997: "How Can I Help You Say Goodbye" from Doky Brothers 2/Chris Minh Doky and Niels Lan Doky (Blue Note Records)
- 1998: "Smile and Pierrot" with Gregor Prächt, David Benoit and the Hollywood Bowl Orchestra, arranged by George Duke
- 2000: "Happiness" from Here's to You, Charlie Brown: 50 Great Years!/David Benoit (GRP)
- 2006: "Take Five (w/Kurt Elling)" from Legends Of Jazz With Ramsey Lewis Showcase/Various Artists (LRS Media)
- 2009: "Whisper Not" from New Time, New Tet/Benny Golson (Concord Jazz)
