= High Crime (album) =

Studio album by Al Jarreau
- Released: October 29, 1984
- Recorded: November 1983 – July 1984
- Studios: Garden Rake Studios (Sherman Oaks); Channel Recorders (Burbank)
- Genres: R&B; funk
- Length: 43:55
- Label: Warner Bros.
- Producer: Jay Graydon

Al Jarreau chronology
Jarreau (1983)	High Crime (1984)	L Is for Lover (1986)

Singles from High Crime
- 1. "After All" Released: July 18, 1984

High Crime is the seventh studio album by Al Jarreau, released on October 29, 1984. While slightly lower in the charts than his 1981 Breakin' Away and 1983 Jarreau release, this album scored in the top 10 on the Billboard Jazz charts and top 50 in the Billboard 200. In 1986 the album received a Grammy Award nomination for Best R&B Vocal Performance, Male. The album was certified Gold in 1986.

== Reception ==
AllMusic gave the album the following review: "High Crime is fueled by the hard-pushing hit from Jarreau's previous album Boogie Down, producer Jay Graydon cranks up the energy level some more and comes up with a snazzy high-tech vehicle for his converted R&B singer. The sound is hotter, stoked by greater reliance upon synthesizers and electronically goosed rhythm tracks, and Jarreau's own vocals are more hectic, though again not much in the way of individuality is required of him. But the material this time isn't as strong—though 'Murphy's Law' is pretty catchy with its flugelhorn punctuations—and so the reluctance to exploit the unique vocal talents of Jarreau is more glaring. The minor hit single of the album, oddly, is the mundane ballad 'After All,' an ominous harbinger of bathos to come from Jarreau down the road."

== Track listing ==
Side one
No.	Title	Writer(s)	Length
1.	"Raging Waters"	Al Jarreau; Jay Graydon; Robbie Buchanan	4:25
2.	"Imagination"	Jarreau; Graydon; Clif Magness; Glen Ballard	4:45
3.	"Murphy's Law"	Steve Kipner; Paul Bliss	4:06
4.	"Tell Me"	Jarreau; Graydon; Greg Phillinganes	4:33
5.	"After All"	Jarreau; Graydon; David Foster	4:18

Side two
No.	Title	Writer(s)	Length
6.	"High Crime"	Jarreau; Graydon; Bobby Lyle	4:29
7.	"Let's Pretend"	Graydon; Richard Page; Steve George; John Lang	3:59
8.	"Sticky Wicket"	Jarreau; Graydon; Phillinganes	4:16
9.	"Love Speaks Louder Than Words"	Bill Champlin; Richard Feldman; Glenn Friedman	3:57
10.	"Fallin'"	Jarreau; Graydon; Nathan East; Marcel East	4:56
Total length:			43:55

== Charts ==
Chart (1985)	Peak position
Australian (Kent Music Report)	65

== Personnel ==
Musicians and vocalists

- Al Jarreau – vocals, backing vocals (3, 6, 9, 10)
- Robbie Buchanan – synthesizers (1, 2, 4, 5, 9), electric piano (6)
- Gary Chang – Fairlight programming (2)
- Paul Bliss – computer concept (3)
- Steve Kipner – computer concept (3)
- Greg Phillinganes – synthesizers (4, 8, 10)
- David Foster – electric piano (5), synthesizers (5)
- Erich Bulling – Yamaha DX1 programming (5)
- Bobby Lyle – synthesizers (6)
- Bo Tomlin – Yamaha DX1 programming (6, 10)
- Steve George – synthesizers (7)
- Jay Graydon – guitars (1–3, 5, 6, 8–10), synthesizers (2–4, 6, 10), computer concept (3)
- Paul Jackson Jr. – guitars (6, 8)
- Bob Beats – bass (1)
- Nathan East – bass (2, 10)
- Jake Jugs – bass (4)
- Skinsoh Umor – drums (1)
- Chip McSticks – drums (2)
- Mike Baird – crash cymbals (2, 9), low hi-hat (2), cymbals (4), drums (5)
- Tyrone B. Feedback – drums (4)
- O. Rapage – drums (7)
- Rug Toupé – drums (7)
- Pat Mastelotto – electronic drums (7)
- U. L. Blowby – drums (8)
- Champ Time – drums (9)
- Tubs Margranate – drums (10)
- Bill Reichenbach Jr. – trombone (2, 8)
- Charles Loper – trombone (2, 8)
- Chuck Findley – trumpet (2, 8)
- Gary Grant – trumpet (2, 8), flugelhorn (3)
- Jerry Hey – trumpet (2, 8), flugelhorn (3)
- Richard Page – backing vocals (3)
- Bill Champlin – backing vocals (6, 8, 9)
- Carmen Twillie – backing vocals (6, 8, 9)
- Siedah Garrett – backing vocals (8)

Music arrangements

- Jay Graydon – arrangements
- Robbie Buchanan – arrangements (1, 5)
- Glen Ballard – arrangements (2)
- Jerry Hey – horn arrangements (2, 8)
- Al Jarreau – arrangements (2, 5)
- Clif Magness – arrangements (2)
- Paul Bliss – arrangements (3)
- Steve Kipner – arrangements (3)
- David Foster – arrangements (5)
- Jeremy Lubbock – arrangements (5)
- Bobby Lyle – arrangements (6)
- Steve George – arrangements (7)
- Richard Page – arrangements (7)
- Greg Phillinganes – arrangements (8)
- Bill Champlin – arrangements (9)
- Richard Feldman – arrangements (9)
- Marcel East – arrangements (10)
- Nathan East – arrangements (10)

== Production ==
- Jay Graydon – producer, engineer, mixing
- Ian Eales – engineer, mixing
- Michael Verdick – mixing
- Steve Hall – mastering at Future Disc (Hollywood, California)
- Shirley Klein – album coordinator
- Jeffrey Kent Ayeroff – art direction
- Michael Hodgson – art direction, design
- Just Loomis – photography
- Monica Dalsasso – lyrical and poetic consultant
- Patrick Rains & Associates – management
