= 1965 (disambiguation) =

1965 was a common year starting on Friday of the Gregorian calendar.

1965 may also refer to:

- 1965 (film), a 2015 Singaporean historical thriller film
- 1965 (The Afghan Whigs album), 1998
- 1965 (Al Jarreau album), 1982
- 1965: Their First Recordings, a 2015 EP by Pink Floyd
- "1965" (song), by Jessie Murph
