= Bill Reichenbach Jr. =

American musician

- Born: William Frank Reichenbach Jr. November 30, 1949 (age 76); Takoma Park, Maryland, U.S.
- Genres: Jazz, jazz fusion, soul, R&B
- Occupations: Session musician, composer
- Instruments: Bass trombone Tenor trombone Contrabass trombone Euphonium; Tuba
- Formerly of: Bill Reichenbach Quartet
- Website: billreichenbach.com

William Frank Reichenbach Jr. (born November 30, 1949) is an American jazz trombonist and composer. He is the son of Bill Reichenbach, who was the drummer for Charlie Byrd from 1962 to 1973. He is best known as a session musician for television, films, cartoons, and commercials. He primarily specializes in playing the bass trombone, however, he is also proficient in playing other instruments such as the tenor trombone, contrabass trombone, euphonium, and tuba.

In 1997 he recorded a solo album, Special Edition, where he is featured on tenor as well as bass trombone.

== Early life and career ==
Reichenbach Jr. was born and raised in Takoma Park, Maryland. He began playing in high school for bands in the Washington, D.C. area, and also sat in with his father's group, where he played with Milt Jackson, Zoot Sims, and others.

He went to Rochester, New York to study at the Eastman School of Music with the legendary teacher Emory Remington, and after graduating, joined the Buddy Rich band.

In 1975, he decided to relocate to Los Angeles, where he would play with the Toshiko Akiyoshi – Lew Tabackin Big Band and the Don Menza Big Band and Sextet in the mid/late 1970s. After his move, he became known for music for television and film.

He played trombone on The Wiz and, with the Seawind Horns including Jerry Hey, on Michael Jackson's albums Off the Wall and Thriller. He also acted as a composer for Cartoon All-Stars to the Rescue.

Bill Reichenbach is a Greenhoe Trombones Performing Artist, performing on a GC5-2R-TIS Bass Trombone with Tuning-in-Slide.

== Collaborations ==
- Children of Sanchez – Chuck Mangione (1978)
- Heartbreaker – Dolly Parton (1978)
- Songbird – Barbra Streisand (1978)
- ...Too – Carole Bayer Sager (1978)
- An Evening of Magic, Live at the Hollywood Bowl – Chuck Mangione (1979)
- Prisoner – Cher (1979)
- Bad Girls – Donna Summer (1979)
- Minnie – Minnie Riperton (1979)
- We're the Best of Friends – Peabo Bryson, Natalie Cole (1979)
- Brenda Russell – Brenda Russell (1979)
- Off the Wall – Michael Jackson (1979)
- This Time – Al Jarreau (1980)
- 9 to 5 and Odd Jobs – Dolly Parton (1980)
- One Bad Habit – Michael Franks (1980)
- Bi-Coastal – Peter Allen (1980)
- 21 at 33 – Elton John (1980)
- Breakin' Away – Al Jarreau (1981)
- What Cha' Gonna Do for Me – Chaka Khan (1981)
- Betty Wright – Betty Wright (1981)
- Love All the Hurt Away – Aretha Franklin (1981)
- Secret Combination – Randy Crawford (1981)
- Donna Summer – Donna Summer (1982)
- Thriller – Michael Jackson (1982)
- Heartbreak Express – Dolly Parton (1982)
- Stay with Me Tonight – Jeffrey Osborne (1983)
- Jarreau – Al Jarreau (1983)
- Swordfishtrombones – Tom Waits (1983)
- Patti Austin – Patti Austin (1984)
- High Crime – Al Jarreau (1984)
- A Private Heaven – Sheena Easton (1984)
- The Heart of the Matter – Kenny Rogers (1985)
- Mathematics – Melissa Manchester (1985)
- Hold Me – Laura Branigan (1985)
- Like a Rock – Bob Seger (1986)
- Swing Street – Barry Manilow (1987)
- Richard Marx – Richard Marx (1987)
- The Rumour – Olivia Newton-John (1988)
- One Love: One Dream – Jeffrey Osborne (1988)
- Heart's Horizon – Al Jarreau (1988)
- Naked to the World – Teena Marie (1988)
- The Best Years of Our Lives – Neil Diamond (1988)
- In the City of Angels – Jon Anderson (1988)
- Tribute to Count Basie – The Gene Harris All Star Big Band (1988)
- Land of Dreams – Randy Newman (1988)
- As Good as It Gets – Deniece Williams (1988)
- Can't Fight Fate – Taylor Dayne (1989)
- Special Love – Deniece Williams (1989)
- Kiss Me with the Wind – Brenda Russell (1990)
- Unforgettable... with Love – Natalie Cole (1991)
- Real Love – Lisa Stansfield (1991)
- The Hunter – Jennifer Warnes (1992)
- World Falling Down – Peter Cetera (1992)
- In Tribute – Diane Schuur (1992)
- Change Your World – Michael W. Smith (1992)
- Rendezvous – Christopher Cross (1992)
- Duets – Elton John (1993)
- Dreams Beyond Control – Spyro Gyra (1993)
- Wagamama na Actress – Miho Nakayama (1993)
- That Secret Place – Patti Austin (1994)
- The Tattooed Heart – Aaron Neville (1995)
- Dreaming of You – Selena (1995)
- This Is The Time: The Christmas Album – Michael Bolton (1996)
- Falling into You – Céline Dion (1996)
- Lisa Stansfield – Lisa Stansfield (1997)
- Across from Midnight – Joe Cocker (1997)
- Standing Together – George Benson (1998)
- A Christmas to Remember – Amy Grant (1999)
- Snowfall on the Sahara – Natalie Cole (1999)
- Tomorrow Today – Al Jarreau (2000)
- Love, Shelby – Shelby Lynne (2001)
- Cry – Faith Hill (2002)
- All I Got – Al Jarreau (2002)
- Reason – Melanie C (2003)
- The Evening of My Best Day – Rickie Lee Jones (2003)
- Rock Swings – Paul Anka (2005)
- B.B. King & Friends: 80 – B.B. King (2005)
- It's Time – Michael Bublé (2005)
- Cool Yule – Bette Midler (2006)
- Harps and Angels – Randy Newman (2008)
- One of the Boys – Katy Perry (2008)
- Home Before Dark – Neil Diamond (2008)
- The Boy Who Knew Too Much – Mika (2009)
- Patrizio – Patrizio Buanne (2009)
- Illuminations – Josh Groban (2010)
- To Be Loved – Michael Bublé (2013)
- Paradise Valley – John Mayer (2013)
- Storytone – Neil Young (2014)
- It's the Girls! – Bette Midler (2014)
- Standards – Seal (2017)
