= Look to the Rainbow =

"Look to the Rainbow" is a song written by Burton Lane and Yip Harburg for the musical Finian's Rainbow.

"Look to the Rainbow" may also refer to:

- Look to the Rainbow (Astrud Gilberto album), released in 1966
- Look to the Rainbow (Al Jarreau album), released in 1977
