= Joe Graydon =

- Birth name: Joseph Graydon Dosh
- Born: February 6, 1919; Washington, D.C., U.S.
- Died: May 19, 2001 (aged 82); Glendale, California
- Genres: Jazz
- Occupation: Vocalist
- Instrument: Vocals
- Years active: 1930s–2001

Joe Graydon (born Joseph G. Dosh, February 6, 1919 – May 19, 2001), was an American big band vocalist, television host, personal manager, and concert producer. He was the father of Grammy-winning songwriter Jay Graydon. and Gary Joseph Graydon. He was the grandfather of Adam Joseph Graydon, Katie I. Graydon, Audrey Caroline Garrish, and Ashley Diane Coats.

== Career ==
Graydon was born in Washington, D.C. on February 6, 1919, the son of Walter B. Dosh, the office manager for a typewriter company. He worked his way through Catholic University in D.C. by singing in nightclubs and college events.

In 1940, he joined the FBI, where he tracked down military deserters during World War II. After the war ended he returned to music, landing a four-month stint as a vocalist on the popular radio program, "Your Hit Parade." In 1949, he recorded a best selling single, "Again" with the Gordon Jenkins Band. It was his only major hit as a recording artist, but helped him obtain a contract with KCOP-TV Channel 13 in Los Angeles hosting a variety show. "The Joe Graydon Show" later moved to KABC Channel 7 in Los Angeles and in 1955, moved to Channel 8 in San Diego.

Unable to sing rock and roll, Graydon decided to give up performing and transitioned into personal management. For two decades, he represented acts including Helen Forrest, Dick Haymes, The Pied Pipers, the Ink Spots and the DeCastro Sisters. As 1940s swing music started to regain popularity, Graydon produced his first concert with Haymes and Forrest in 1978. Eventually he produced about four concerts a year. He died of cancer in his home in Glendale, California on Saturday, May 19, 2001.
