= Jay Graydon =

Musical artist (born 1949)

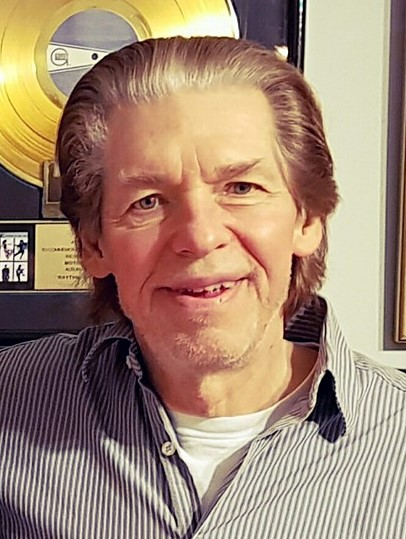
- Graydon in 2019.

Background information
- Born: Jay Joseph Graydon; October 8, 1949 (age 77); Burbank, California
- Occupations: Guitarist, songwriter, producer

Jay Joseph Graydon (born October 8, 1949, Burbank, California) is an American songwriter, recording artist, guitarist, singer, keyboardist, producer, arranger, and recording engineer. He is the winner of two Grammy Awards (in the R&B category) with twelve Grammy nominations, among them the title "Producer of the Year" and "Best Engineered Recording". He has mastered many different music styles and genres, and his recordings have been featured on record, film, television and the stage.

== History ==
Graydon made his singing debut on his second birthday on the "Joe Graydon Show," the first music/talk television show in Los Angeles, hosted by his father, Joe Graydon.

During and for a brief time after his college days, Graydon played in the Don Ellis Band, whose style can be described as experimental post-bop jazz. He can be heard on the live double album Don Ellis at Fillmore and the studio albums The New Don Ellis Band Goes Underground, Connection and Soaring.

=== L. A. session musician ===
From the late 1960s to late 1970s Graydon was a session musician in Los Angeles, working with such artists as Gino Vannelli, Barbra Streisand, Dolly Parton, Diana Ross, The Jackson Five, Alice Cooper, Cheap Trick, Al Jarreau, Christopher Cross, Ray Charles, Cher, Joe Cocker, Marvin Gaye, Hall & Oates, Wayne Shorter, Olivia Newton-John, Albert King and Steely Dan. One of Graydon's most notable session performances is his guitar solo on Steely Dan's 1977 hit single "Peg". Several prominent session guitarists attempted the solo on "Peg" before Jay Graydon, who, according to Walter Becker, "did it with no difficulty whatsoever".

In 1977 he appeared as a character in a number of Doonesbury strips as Jay "Wah-Wah" Graydon. Graydon played on the Jimmy Thudpucker album Greatest Hits along with Steve Cropper and Donald "Duck" Dunn. He was the subject of the track "Fretman Sam" and played its guitar solo. He also programmed the synthesizers for the album.

=== Producer ===
Jay Graydon's production credits include work with Airplay, Air Supply, George Benson, Al Jarreau, DeBarge, El DeBarge, Sheena Easton, Art Garfunkel, The Manhattan Transfer, Johnny Mathis, Patti LaBelle, Lou Rawls, Dionne Warwick, Alan Sorrenti and the album They Don't Make Them Like They Used To by Kenny Rogers.

He started his own record label, Sonic Thrust Records, in 2001 to give himself creative and artistic freedom in his songwriting and producing profession. The label features straight-ahead jazz, adult contemporary pop, AAA, AOR, classic R&B, smooth jazz, and genuine retro surf from the 1960s.

As a musician and recording engineer, he has often been a consultant and beta tester for new musical equipment and recording gear.

=== Songwriter ===
Graydon has written over 200 songs. His catalog includes the Grammy winners "Turn Your Love Around" (co-written with Steve Lukather and Bill Champlin) as performed by George Benson and "After the Love Has Gone" (co-written with David Foster and Bill Champlin) as performed by Earth, Wind & Fire, as well as "Who's Holding Donna Now" (DeBarge), "Friends in Love" (Dionne Warwick and Johnny Mathis), many songs written with and for Al Jarreau (including "Mornin'", "Breakin' Away", "High Crime", "After All", and "Roof Garden"), and several hits with Manhattan Transfer including "Twilight Zone", "On The Boulevard", "Smile Again" and "Spies in the Night". Many of his songs were co-written with David Foster.

=== Writer and educator ===
Graydon has written numerous articles in music magazines, and has conducted seminars at Musician's Institute in Hollywood with guitarist Tommy Tedesco for more than 15 years. He has been working on a series of books on recording techniques with Craig Anderton, a widely published and bestselling authority on recording technology. The books will discuss the subtleties of recording various instruments, as well as mixing.

=== Film scores ===
Graydon has participated as a musician and/or songwriter in over 50 film scores including The French Connection, Grease, Ghostbusters, St. Elmo's Fire, The Secret of My Success, Navy Seals, Lady Sings the Blues, The Greatest, Ghost Dad, Mahogany, and Thank God It's Friday.

=== Television ===
Graydon has played on or written songs for The Andy Williams Show, The Jackson 5 Show, The Alan Thicke Show, The David Steinberg Show, The Ed Sullivan Show, The Tonight Show, The Merv Griffin Show, The Soupy Sales Show, The Smothers Brothers Show, The Midnight Special, The First Rock and Roll Awards Show, Miami Vice, and Starsky and Hutch.

With Richard Page, he also wrote the second theme song for Gimme a Break!, which was used from its third through sixth seasons.

== Key collaborations ==
=== Al Jarreau ===
Perhaps Graydon's most noted collaboration has been with Al Jarreau. Graydon was Jarreau's main songwriter/producer in the early 1980s. Graydon produced Jarreau's albums This Time, Breakin' Away, Jarreau and High Crime, among others. Graydon also played guitar and synthesizer on these albums, as well as serving as songwriter, arranger and engineer.

=== David Foster ===
Foster and Graydon have worked together on several album projects, including the band Airplay, a pop-rock group they formed in the late 1970s, and the JT Super Producer concert in Japan in 1994 with René Angélil and Céline Dion.

=== Randy Goodrum ===
Graydon and Randy Goodrum formed a group named JaR. In 2008, they released an album titled Scene 29, described as "Steely Dan meets Airplay and Pages".

=== Steely Dan ===
Graydon played the guitar solo on the song "Peg" on Steely Dan's 1977 album Aja. Graydon has said that he was unaware of whether or not Becker and Fagen would keep the solo until he heard the finished song on the radio.

=== David "Fathead" Newman ===
- He played on Concrete Jungle.

== Discography ==
=== Solo albums ===
Year	Album title	Notes
1993	Airplay for the Planet	
2001	Bebop	
2006	Past to Present - The 70s	
2008	Airplay for the Planet - Live in Japan	

=== Collaborations ===
Year	Artist	Album title	Role(s)
1974	Boz Scaggs	Slow Dancer	Guitars
1974	Joe Cocker	I Can Stand a Little Rain	Guitars
1975	Gino Vannelli	Storm at Sunup	Guitars
1975	Aretha Franklin	You	Guitars
1975	Barbra Streisand	Lazy Afternoon	Guitars
1975	2nd Chapter of Acts	In the Volume of the Book	Guitars
1976	Albert King	Albert	Guitars
1976	Candi Staton	Young Hearts Run Free	Guitars
1976	Paul Anka	The Painter	Guitars
1976	Jennifer Warnes	Jennifer Warnes	Guitars
1976	Marvin Gaye	I Want You	Guitars
1976	Donovan	Slow Down World	Synthesizer, programming
1976	Cher	I'd Rather Believe in You	Guitar, mandolin
1976	Stephen Bishop	Careless	Electric guitar, acoustic guitar
1976	Gino Vannelli	The Gist of the Gemini	Electric guitar
1977	Olivia Newton-John	Making a Good Thing Better	Electric guitar, acoustic guitar, slide guitar
1977	Dolly Parton	Here You Come Again	Pedal steel guitar
1977	Boz Scaggs	Down Two Then Left	Guitar, guitar solo
1977	Steely Dan	Aja	Guitar solo on "Peg"
1977	Rhythm Heritage	Last Night on Earth	Lead guitar
1977	Marlena Shaw	Sweet Beginnings	Guitar
1977	Paul Anka	The Music Man	Guitar
1977	Jackie DeShannon	You're the Only Dancer	Guitar
1977	Leo Sayer	Thunder in My Heart	Guitar
1977	Dionne Warwick	Love at First Sight	Guitar
1977	Shaun Cassidy	Born Late	Guitar
1977	Dalbello	Lisa Dal Bello	Guitar
1977	Syreeta Wright	Rich Love, Poor Love	Guitar
1978	Various Artists	Grease Soundtrack	Guitar
1978	Carole Bayer Sager	...Too	Guitar
1978	Leo Sayer	Leo Sayer	Guitar
1978	Melissa Manchester	Don't Cry Out Loud	Guitar
1978	Barbra Streisand	Songbird	Guitar
1978	Dane Donohue	Dane Donohue	Guitar
1978	Paul Anka	Listen to Your Heart	Guitar
1978	Helen Reddy	We'll Sing in the Sunshine	Guitar
1978	Juice Newton	Well Kept Secret	Guitar
1978	Shaun Cassidy	Under Wraps	Guitar
1978	Candi Staton	House of Love	Guitar
1978	Valerie Carter	Wild Child	Guitar
1978	2nd Chapter of Acts	Mansion Builder	Guitar
1978	Ben E. King	Let Me Live in Your Life	Guitar
1978	Rhythm Heritage	Sky's the Limit	Guitar, arranger, writer
1978	Alice Cooper	From The Inside	Guitar, synthesizer programming
1978	Brian Cadd	Yesterdaydreams	Synthesiser
1978	Rita Coolidge	Love Me Again	Guitar, acoustic guitar
1978	Nigel Olsson	Nigel Olsson	Guitar, electric guitar
1978	Pages	Pages	Engineer, guitar, horns, keyboard programming, producer, songwriter
1979	Barbra Streisand	Wet	Electric guitar
1979	Christopher Cross	Christopher Cross	Guitar solo
1979	Cher	Take Me Home	Guitar
1979	Paul Anka	Headlines	Guitar
1979	Peter Allen	I Could Have Been a Sailor	Guitar
1979	Yvonne Elliman	Yvonne	Guitar
1979	Donna Summer	Bad Girls	Guitar
1979	Rhythm Heritage	Disco Derby	Guitar
1979	Nigel Olsson	Nigel	Electric guitar, acoustic guitar
1979	The Manhattan Transfer	Extensions	Producer, arrangement, guitars, synthesizers, guitar solo, additional vocals, synthesizer programming, Mixing and Overdub Tracking
1979	Marc Jordan	Blue Desert	Lead guitar, synthesizer, arranger, conductor, producer, engineer
1979	Earth, Wind & Fire	I Am	Songwriter
1980	Peter Allen	Bi-Coastal	Guitar
1980	2nd Chapter of Acts	The Roar of Love	Guitar
1980	Syreeta Wright	Syreeta	Musician
1980	Bernie Taupin	He Who Rides the Tiger	Electric Guitar
1980	Mariya Takeuchi	Miss M	Acoustic and electric guitars, rhythm arrangement, backing vocals, songwriter
1980	Airplay	Airplay	Producer, guitar, lead and backing vocals, overdubbing, mixing, songwriter
1980	Al Jarreau	This Time	Synthesizer programming, electric guitar, rhythm arrangements, producer, engineer
1981	Al Jarreau	Breakin' Away	Producer, mixing, songwriter, electric guitar, synthesizer programming, rhythm arrangements, vocal arrangements
1981	Dolly Parton	Dolly, Dolly, Dolly	Guitar
1981	Carole Bayer Sager	Sometimes Late at Night	Guitar
1981	The Manhattan Transfer	Mecca for Moderns	Producer, songwriter, guitar, synthesizer, arrangements
1981	Pages	Pages	Composer, engineer, guitar, mixing, producer, programming
1982	Herbie Hancock	Lite Me Up	Composer, engineer, guitar, producer, songwriter
1982	Dionne Warwick	Friends in Love	Producer, rhythm arrangements, synthesizers, guitar, percussion, recording, mixing
1983	Donna Summer	She Works Hard for the Money	Songwriter, guitar
1983	The Tubes	Outside Inside	Special Musical Contributor
1983	Paul Anka	Walk a Fine Line	Composer
1983	Sheena Easton	Best Kept Secret	Guitar, producer, engineer
1983	Christopher Cross	Another Page	Guitar solo
1983	David Foster	The Best Of Me	Composer, engineer, guitar, songwriter
1983	Al Jarreau	Jarreau	Producer, songwriter, rhythm arrangements, guitar, synthesizers, guitar solo, engineering
1984	Al Jarreau	High Crime	Producer, songwriter, guitar, arrangements, synthesizers, computer concept
1985	DeBarge	Rhythm of the Night	Producer, songwriter, guitars, synthesizers
1986	El DeBarge	El DeBarge	Synthesizer, guitar, songwriter, arranger, producer, engineer
1986	Kenny Rogers	They Don't Make Them Like They Used To	Producer, engineer, songwriter, synthesizers, lead guitar, electronic drums, arrangements, guitar solo, drums, guitar lines
1986	Al Jarreau	L Is for Lover	Songwriter
1988	Al Jarreau	Heart's Horizon	Producer, songwriter, synthesizers
1988	Art Garfunkel	Lefty	Producer, engineer
1988	George Benson	Twice the Love	Producer, synthesizers, drums, arrangements, engineer, mixing
1989	El DeBarge	Gemini	Producer, songwriter
1993	Planet 3	Music From The Planet	Guitars, keyboards, programming, mixing, recording
2004	Planet 3	Gems Unearthed	Lead guitar, keyboards, programming, liner notes, mastering
2008	JaR	Scene 29	Lead and backing vocals, guitar, drums, synthesizer, composer, arranger, producer, engineer, mixing and mastering

== Grammy Awards ==
Year Awarded	Nominee/work	Category	Result	Ref.
1980	"After the Love Has Gone" (Earth, Wind & Fire)	Song of the Year (shared with Bill Champlin & David Foster)	Nominated	
1980	"After the Love Has Gone" (Earth, Wind & Fire)	Best Rhythm & Blues Song (shared with Bill Champlin & David Foster)	Won	
1981	"Twilight Zone/Twilight Tone" (The Manhattan Transfer)	Best Arrangement for Voices (shared with Alan Paul)	Nominated	
1982	Breakin' Away (Al Jarreau)	Album of the Year (shared with Al Jarreau)	Nominated	
1982	"Kafka" (The Manhattan Transfer)	Best Vocal Arrangement for Two or More Voices (shared with Bernard Kafka)	Nominated	
1983	"Turn Your Love Around" (George Benson)	Best Rhythm & Blues Song (shared with Bill Champlin & Steve Lukather)	Won	
1984	Jarreau (Al Jarreau)	Producer of the Year (Non-Classical)	Nominated	
1984	Jarreau (Al Jarreau)	Best Engineered Recording – Non-Classical (shared with Ian Eales & Eric Prestis)	Nominated	
1984	"Mornin'" (Al Jarreau)	Best Instrumental Arrangement Accompanying Vocal(s) (shared with David Foster & Jeremy Lubbock)	Nominated	
1984	"Step by Step" (Al Jarreau)	Best Instrumental Arrangement Accompanying Vocal(s) (shared with Tom Canning, Jerry Hey & Al Jarreau)	Nominated	
1985	Ghostbusters Soundtrack (various artists)	Best Album of Original Score Written for a Motion Picture or a Television Special (shared with various artists & producers)	Nominated	
1986	St. Elmo's Fire Soundtrack (various artists)	Best Album of Original Score Written for a Motion Picture or a Television Special (shared with various artists & producers)	Nominated	
