= Jerry Hey =

American musician

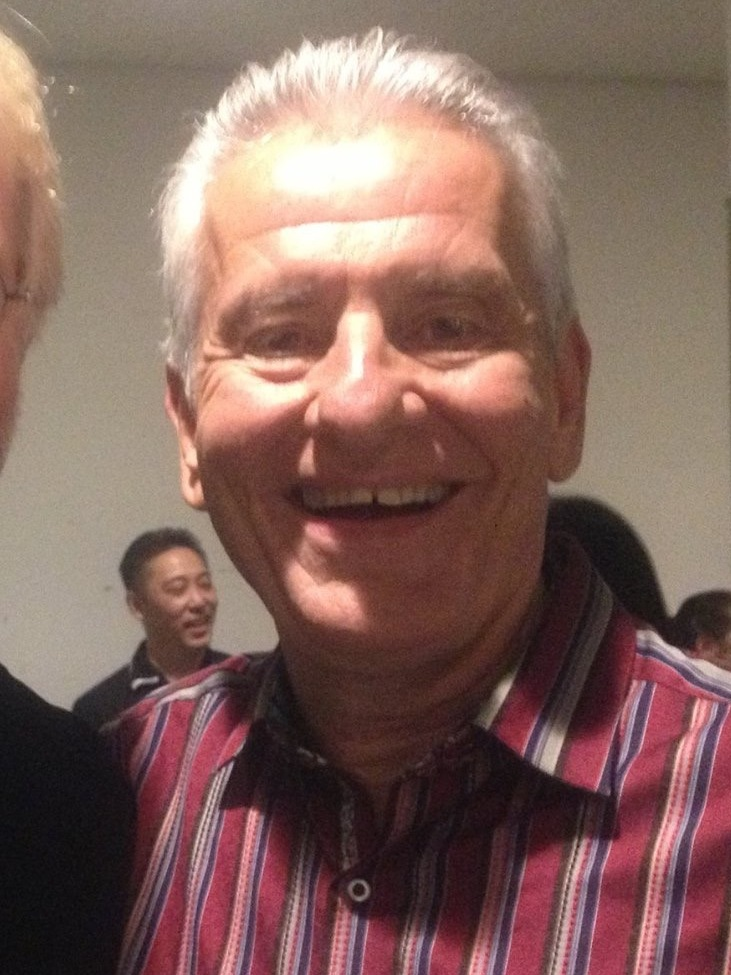

Background information
- Born: Jerome Richard Hey; March 28, 1950 (age 76); Dixon, Illinois, U.S.
- Genres: Jazz; jazz rock; jazz fusion; pop
- Occupations: Musician; bandleader
- Instruments: Trumpet; flugelhorn
- Years active: 1960s–present
- Formerly of: Seawind; Toshiko Akiyoshi – Lew Tabackin Big Band; Earth, Wind & Fire; Airplay; The Tubes

Jerome Richard Hey (born March 28, 1950) is an American trumpeter, flugelhornist, arranger (horns and strings), orchestrator and session musician who has played on hundreds of commercial recordings, including Michael Jackson's Thriller, "Rock with You", "Don’t Stop ‘Til You Get Enough", "Workin’ Day and Night" and the flugelhorn solo on Dan Fogelberg's hit "Longer". He has performed with artists such as George Benson, Nik Kershaw, Al Jarreau, Barbra Streisand, Donna Summer, Earth, Wind & Fire, Whitney Houston, Frank Sinatra, George Duke, Lionel Richie, Rufus and Chaka Khan, Natalie Cole, Aretha Franklin, Patti Austin, Toshiki Kadomatsu, and Yumi Matsutoya.

He is known as the trumpeter and arranger for Seawind, whose other members have included Gary Grant, Larry Williams and Bill Reichenbach Jr.

== Biography ==
Jerome Richard Hey was born on March 28, 1950 in Dixon, Illinois, to a family of musicians. His mother was a pianist and his father was a trombonist; two older brothers played trombone and tuba. After completing high school, Hey attended the National Music Camp for two summers. While in college, Hey studied under Bill Adam at Indiana University.

Hey then relocated to Hawaii to become a member of the band Seawind.

In 1976, Hey moved to Los Angeles with Seawind, which then recorded two albums for CTI Records under the direction of Harvey Mason.

Gary Grant, who had already been in the city for a year when Hey arrived and was a well-known session player, invited Hey to join him on recording sessions, which helped to launch his career as a studio musician.

Soon after arriving in LA, Quincy Jones got in touch with Hey to ask him to play and arrange for Jones's album I Heard That!!. Following that session, Hey and his associates were invited to perform on every one of Quincy's recordings. Hey later worked as a musician and arranger with David Foster.

Hey is the uncle of American keyboardist, songwriter, producer, arranger and musical director Henry Hey.

He composed and arranged the song "Jedi Rocks" for the 1997 Special Edition re-release of Return of the Jedi. He co-produced four songs on Lisa Stansfield's 2014 album Seven.

Hey has received 6 Grammy Awards and 11 nominations.

== Awards ==
=== Grammy Awards ===
- 1981 – Best Instrumental Arrangement
  - Jerry Hey & Quincy Jones (arrangers) for "Dinorah, Dinorah" performed by George Benson
- 1982 – Best Instrumental Arrangement Accompanying Vocal(s)
  - Jerry Hey & Quincy Jones (arrangers) for "Ai No Corrida" performed by Quincy Jones
- 1983 – Best Instrumental Arrangement Accompanying Vocal(s)
  - Jerry Hey & David Paich, Jeff Porcaro (arrangers) for "Rosanna" performed by Toto
- 1984 – Best Album of Original Score Written for a Motion Picture or A Television Special
  - Michael Boddicker, Irene Cara, Kim Carnes, Douglas Cotler, Keith Forsey, Richard Gilbert, Jerry Hey, Duane Hitchings, Craig Krampf, Ronald Magness, Dennis Matkosky, Giorgio Moroder, Phil Ramone, Michael Sembello, Shandi Sinnamon (composers) for Flashdance performed by various artists
- 1991 – Best Arrangement on an Instrumental
  - Jerry Hey, Quincy Jones, Ian Prince & Rod Temperton (arrangers) for "Birdland" performed by Quincy Jones.
- 1991 - Best Instrumental Arrangement Accompanying Vocal(s)
  - Glen Ballard, Jerry Hey, Quincy Jones and Clif Magness (arrangers) for "The Places You Find Love" performed by Quincy Jones

== Discography ==
With Earth, Wind & Fire
- I Am (Columbia, 1979)
- Faces (Columbia, 1980)
- Raise! (Columbia, 1981)
- Powerlight (Columbia, 1983)
- Electric Universe (Columbia, 1983)
- Touch the World (Columbia, 1987)
- Heritage (Columbia, 1990)
- Millennium (Warner Bros., 1993)
- In the Name of Love (Rhino, 1997)
- The Promise (Kalimba, 2003)
- Illumination (Sanctuary, 2005)
- Now, Then & Forever (Legacy, 2013)
- Holiday (Legacy, 2014)

With Billy Crystal & Christopher Guest

- "I Hate When That Happens" (A&M Records, 1985)

With The Brothers Johnson

- Blam! (A&M Records, 1978)
- Light Up The Night (A&M Records, 1980)
- Winners (A&M Records, 1981)
- Blast! (A&M Records, 1982)

With Luis Miguel

- Soy Como Quiero Ser (Warner, 1987)
- Busca una Mujer (Warner, 1988)
- 20 Años (Warner, 1990)
- Aries (Warner, 1993)
- Segundo Romance (Warner, 1994)
- Nada Es Igual (Warner, 1996)
- Amarte Es Un Placer (Warner, 1999)
- Mis Romances (Warner, 2001)
- 33 (Warner, 2003)
- Cómplices (Warner, 2008)
- Luis Miguel (Warner, 2010)

With Lalo Schifrin

- No One Home (Tabu, 1979)

With Aretha Franklin

- Love All the Hurt Away (Arista, 1981)
- Jump to It (Arista, 1982)
- Aretha (Arista, 1986)

With Elton John

- 21 at 33 (Rocket, 1980)
- Duets (Rocket, 1993)

With Olivia Newton-John

- The Rumour (Mercury, 1988)

With Bob Seger

- Like a Rock (Capitol, 1986)

With Kenny Rogers

- The Heart of the Matter (RCA, 1985)

With Syreeta Wright

- Set My Love in Motion (Tamla, 1981)

With Joe Cocker

- Across from Midnight (CMC, 1997)

With Cher

- Prisoner (Casablanca, 1979)

With Dionne Warwick

- Friends in Love (Arista, 1982)

With Cheryl Lynn

- In Love (Columbia, 1979)
- Start Over (Manhattan, 1987)

With Celine Dion

- Falling into You (Columbia, 1996)

With Jon Anderson

- In the City of Angels (Columbia, 1988)

With Patti LaBelle

- Winner in You (MCA, 1986)

With Shelby Lynne

- Love, Shelby (Island, 2001)

With Thelma Houston

- Breakwater Cat (RCA, 1980)

With Selena

- Dreaming of You (EMI, 1995)

With Barry Manilow

- Swing Street (Arista, 1987)

With Taylor Dayne

- Can't Fight Fate (Arista, 1989)

With Patti Austin

- Patti Austin (Qwest, 1984)
- The Real Me (Qwest, 1988)
- That Secret Place (GRP, 1994)
- On the Way to Love (Warner Bros., 2001)

With Michael Bolton

- Time, Love & Tenderness (Columbia, 1991)
- This Is The Time: The Christmas Album (Columbia, 1996)

With Jeffrey Osborne

- Jeffrey Osborne (A&M, 1982)
- Stay with Me Tonight (A&M, 1983)
- One Love: One Dream (A&M, 1988)

With Lisa Stansfield

- Real Love (Arista, 1991)
- Lisa Stansfield (Arista, 1997)

With Anita Baker

- Rhythm of Love (Elektra, 1994)
- My Everything (Blue Note, 2004)

With Stevie Nicks

- The Other Side of the Mirror (Modern, 1989)

With Christopher Cross

- Every Turn of the World (Warner Bros., 1985)

With Dan Fogelberg

- Phoenix (Epic, 1979)
- The Innocent Age (Epic, 1981)
- The Wild Places (Epic, 1990)

With Tanya Tucker

- Should I Do It (MCA Records, 1981)

With David Crosby

- Oh Yes I Can (A&M, 1989)

With Kenny Loggins

- Back to Avalon (Columbia, 1988)

With Minnie Riperton

- Minnie (Capitol, 1979)

With Steve Cropper

- Playin' My Thang (MCA, 1981)

With Brenda Russell

- Brenda Russell (Horizon, 1979)
- Two Eyes (Warner Bros., 1983)

With Stephanie Mills

- Home (MCA, 1989)

With Joni Mitchell

- Dog Eat Dog (Geffen, 1985)

With Melissa Manchester

- Emergency (Arista, 1983)
- Mathematics (MCA, 1985)

With Jim Messina

- Messina (Warner Bros., 1981)

With Deniece Williams

- Hot on the Trail (Columbia, 1986)
- As Good as It Gets (Columbia, 1988)
- Special Love (Sparrow, 1989)

With Teena Marie

- Lady T (Gordy, 1980)

With Peter Allen

- Bi-Coastal (A&M, 1980)
- Not The Boy Next Door (Arista, 1983)

With Beth Hart

- Leave the Light On (Warner Bros., 2003)

With Donna Summer

- Bad Girls (Casablanca, 1979)
- Donna Summer (Geffen, 1982)
- She Works Hard for the Money (Mercury, 1983)
- All Systems Go (Geffen, 1987)

With Paul Anka

- The Music Man (United Artists, 1976)

With Chaka Khan

- What Cha' Gonna Do for Me (Warner Bros., 1981)

With Barry Mann

- Barry Mann (Casablanca, 1980)

With Melanie C

- Reason (Virgin, 2003)

With Sheena Easton

- A Private Heaven (EMI, 1984)

With John Mayer

- Heavier Things (Columbia, 2003)
- The Search for Everything (Columbia, 2017)

With Dolly Parton

- Heartbreaker (RCA Victor, 1978)
- 9 to 5 and Odd Jobs (RCA, 1980)

With Boz Scaggs

- Other Roads (Columbia, 1988)

With Randy Crawford

- Windsong (Warner Bros., 1982)

With Rickie Lee Jones

- Pirates (Warner Bros., 1981)
- The Magazine (Warner Bros., 1984)
- The Evening of My Best Day (V2, 2003)

With Carole Bayer Sager

- ...Too (Elektra, 1978)
- Sometimes Late at Night (The Boardwalk Entertainment, 1981)

With Paul McCartney

- Pipes of Peace (Columbia, 1983)

With Michael McDonald

- No Lookin' Back (Warner Bros., 1985)

With Michael Jackson

- Off the Wall (Epic, 1979)
- Thriller (Epic, 1982)
- Bad (Epic, 1987)

With Desmond Child

- Discipline (Elektra, 1991)

With Betty Wright

- Betty Wright (Epic, 1981)

With Roberta Flack

- Oasis (Atlantic, 1988)

With Richard Marx

- Richard Marx (EMI, 1987)
- Repeat Offender (EMI, 1989)
- Flesh and Bone (Capitol, 1997)

With Mika

- The Boy Who Knew Too Much (Casablanca, 2009)

With Philip Bailey

- Continuation (A&M, 1983)

With Rod Stewart

- Camouflage (Warner Bros., 1984)

With Randy Newman

- Trouble in Paradise (Reprise, 1983)
- Land of Dreams (Reprise, 1988)

With Natalie Cole

- Dangerous (Atco, 1985)
- Everlasting (Elektra, 1987)

With B.B. King

- B.B. King & Friends: 80 (Geffen, 2005)

With Peter Cetera

- World Falling Down (Warner Bros., 1992)

With Nicolette Larson

- In the Nick of Time (Warner Bros. Records, 1979)

With Barbra Streisand

- Songbird (Columbia, 1978)
- Till I Loved You (Columbia, 1988)

With Jennifer Warnes

- The Hunter (Attic, 1992)

With Rob Thomas

- ...Something to Be (Atlantic Records, 2005)

With Laura Branigan

- Hold Me (Atlantic, 1985)

With Jimmy Webb

- Angel Heart (Real West Production, 1982)

With Al Jarreau

- This Time (Warner Bros., 1980)
- Breakin' Away (Warner Bros., 1981)
- Jarreau (Warner Bros., 1983)
- High Crime (Warner Bros., 1984)
- Heart's Horizon (Reprise, 1988)
- Heaven and Earth (Reprise, 1992)
- Tomorrow Today (GRP, 2000)
- All I Got (GRP, 2002)

With Jennifer Holliday

- Feel My Soul (Geffen, 1983)

With James Last Band

- Seduction (Polydor, 1980)

With George Benson

- Give Me the Night (Warner Bros., 1980)
- 20/20 (Warner Bros., 1985)
- While the City Sleeps... (Warner Bros., 1986)
- Standing Together (GRP, 1998)

With Livingston Taylor

- Three Way Mirror (Epic, 1978)

With Neil Diamond

- September Morn (Columbia, 1979)
- The Best Years of Our Lives (Columbia, 1988)

With Michael Franks

- One Bad Habit (Warner Bros., 1980)

With Atkins

- Atkins (also does the horn section on Keep Trying) (Warner Bros., 1982)

With Darren Kramer Organization

- The Darren Kramer Organization (1998)

With Tom Petty and the Heartbreakers

- Southern Accents (MCA Records, 1985)
- Playback (MCA Records, 1995)

With Toto (band)

- Fahrenheit (Columbia Records, 1986)

With Miho Nakayama

- Wagamama na Actress (King Records, 1993)
- Mid Blue (King Records, 1995)

With Pauline Wilson

- Tribute (McClees Corp., 2001)

With The Square/T-SQUARE

- R･E･S･O･R･T (CBS/Sony, 1985)
- Yes, No (CBS/Sony, 1988)
- Refreshest (Sony, 1991)

With Dave Weckl/Dave Weckl Band

- Master Plan (GRP, 1990)
- Live (and very plugged in) (Stretch, 2003)

With David Foster

- David Foster (Atlantic, 1986)
- The Christmas Album (Interscope Records, 1995)

With Wilson Phillips

- Shadows And Light (SBK Records, 1992)

With TM Network

- Humansystem (Epic/Sony, 1987)

With KC and the Sunshine Band

- All in a Night's Work (Epic, 1982)

With Pleasure

- Future Now (Fantasy Records, 1979)
- Special Things (Fantasy Records, 1980)

With Patrice Rushen

- Patrice (Elektra Records, 1978)

=== Soundtracks ===
As sideman on soundtrack recordings

- Aladdin soundtrack (Walt Disney, 1992)
- Ally McBeal soundtrack (1997-2002)
- Analyze This soundtrack (1999)
- Austin Powers I, Austin Powers II, Austin Powers III (2002) soundtrack
- Back to the Future soundtrack (MCA, 1985)
- Back to the Future Part II soundtrack (1989)
- Back to the Future Part III soundtrack (1990)
- BAD short film soundtrack (1987)
- Bad Boys soundtrack (1983)
- Blown Away soundtrack (1994)
- Bowfinger soundtrack (1999)
- Big Trouble soundtrack (2002)
- Bridge to Terabithia soundtrack (2006)
- Captain EO short film soundtrack (1986)
- Caddyshack soundtrack (1980)
- Contact soundtrack
- CHiPs soundtrack (1977-1983)
- Disney features - Hercules (1997), Blast from the Past (1998), Little Mermaid (1989), Beauty and the Beast (1991), Isn’t She Great (1999) soundtracks
- Father of the Bride I and Father of the Bride II soundtrack
- Fandango soundtrack (1984)
- Forrest Gump soundtrack
- George of the Jungle soundtrack (Walt Disney, 1997)
- Grand Canyon soundtrack (1991)
- Godzilla soundtrack (Epic, 1998)
- Grumpy Old Men and Grumpier Old Men soundtrack
- Gypsy soundtrack (1993)
- Lilo & Stitch soundtrack (Walt Disney, 2002)
- Men in Black II soundtrack (Columbia, 2002)
- Meet the Applegates soundtrack (1990)
- Meet the Fockers soundtrack (2004)
- Meet the Browns soundtrack (2008)
- Mousehunt soundtrack (Varese Sarabande, 1997)
- Mulan soundtrack (Walt Disney, 1998)
- Payback soundtrack (1998)
- Paternity soundtrack (Kritzerland, 2014)
- Pocahontas soundtrack (Walt Disney, 1995)
- Predator soundtrack (Varèse Sarabande, 1987)
- Pretty Woman soundtrack (EMI, 1990)
- Running Scared soundtrack (MCA, 1986)
- Romeo Must Die soundtrack (2000)
- Rocky II soundtrack (United Artists/EMI, 1979)
- Rocky III soundtrack (Liberty, 1982)
- Rocky IV soundtrack (Scotti Bros., 1985)
- Reindeer Games soundtrack
- Shrek Forever After soundtrack (DGC, 2010)
- Spacejam soundtrack (Warner, 1996)
- Spiderman 2 soundtrack (Sony, 2004)
- Star Wars Episode VI: Return of the Jedi soundtrack (Sony, 1997)
- Star Wars Episode VIII: The Last Jedi soundtrack (Walt Disney, 2017)
- Stuart Little soundtrack (Motown, 1999)
- Superbad soundtrack (Lakeshore, 2007)
- Sister Act I & Sister Act II soundtrack
- Sudden Impact soundtrack (1983)
- The Adventures of Pluto Nash soundtrack (Beverly, 2002)
- The Karate Kid Part II soundtrack (Warner Bros., 1986)
- The Polar Express soundtrack (Reprise, 2004)
- The Ugly Truth soundtrack (Lakeshore, 2009)
- The Bodyguard soundtrack (1992)
- The Color Purple soundtrack (1985)
- The Odd Couple II soundtrack
- The Notebook soundtrack (2004)
- The Shadow soundtrack (1994)
- Waterboy soundtrack (1998)
- Waiting to Exhale soundtrack (2000)
- Return to Me soundtrack (Sony Legacy, 2000)
- What Lies Beneath soundtrack (Varese Sarabande, 2000)
- Who Framed Roger Rabbit? soundtrack (Buena Vista, 1988)
- Judge Dredd / Expanded Original Motion Picture Score soundtrack (1995)
- Young Guns II soundtrack (Intrada Special Collection, 2011)
- Fandango soundtrack (Intrada Special Collection, 1984)
- Blown Away soundtrack (Intrada Special Collection, 1994)
