= We're in This Love Together =

1981 single by Al Jarreau

Single by Al Jarreau

from the album Breakin' Away
- B-side: "Alonzo"
- Released: July 1981
- Genre: Soul, jazz
- Length: 3:44
- Label: Warner Bros.
- Songwriters: Roger Murrah, Keith Stegall
- Producer: Jay Graydon

Al Jarreau singles chronology
"We're in This Love Together" (1981)	"Breakin' Away" (1981)

Music video
- "We're in This Love Together" Official Video on YouTube

"We're in This Love Together" is a 1981 hit song by Al Jarreau. It was the first of three single releases from his fifth studio album, Breakin' Away. The song was his first and biggest chart hit.

In the US, the song spent 24 weeks on the pop charts, reaching number 15 on the Billboard Hot 100 and number 13 on the Cash Box Top 100. It was a bigger Adult Contemporary hit, reaching number six in the US and number one in Canada.

== Background ==
Jarreau and the song's producer Jay Graydon were going through songs to record in search of a hit single. Despite being a critically acclaimed jazz vocalist, Graydon felt Jarreau needed a hit to reach a wider audience. "We're In This Love Together" was the last song at the bottom of the box, to which Graydon said "This better be our hit." Although the song was closely associated with Jarreau, the song wasn't written for him in mind. According to the song's co-writer Keith Stegall, "We're In This Love Together" was originally intended for Jarreau's labelmates at Warner Bros. Records, Neil Larsen and Buzz Feiten for their 1980 album The Larsen-Feiten Band. Instead of being given to them, the song was mistakenly given to Jarreau. Stegall also noted the song was first pitched to singer Johnny Mathis, but did not receive a response from him. Much later, Mathis covered the song in his 2008 album, A Night to Remember.

== Charts ==
=== Weekly charts ===
Chart (1981–82)	Peak position
Canada RPM Top Singles	42
Canada RPM Adult Contemporary	1
New Zealand (RIANZ)	24
UK (Official Charts Company)	55
US Billboard Hot 100	15
US Billboard Adult Contemporary	6
US Billboard Hot Soul Singles	6
US Cash Box Top 100	13

=== Year-end charts ===
Chart (1981)	Rank
US Cash Box Top 100	93
