= 1965 (Al Jarreau album) =

Studio album by Al Jarreau
- Released: 1982
- Recorded: 1965
- Studio: Studio Four
- Genre: Jazz
- Label: Bainbridge Records
- Producers: Dimitri Sotirakus; Tony Sotirakus

Al Jarreau chronology
Breakin' Away (1981)	1965 (1982)	Jarreau (1983)

Professional ratings
Review scores
Source	Rating
AllMusic	4/5 stars

1965 is an album by Al Jarreau, released in 1982 on Bainbridge Records.

== History ==
The album contains material recorded by Jarreau in 1965. Bainbridge Records acquired the rights to the recordings in 1968. Originally slated to be released in May 1982 under the title My Favorite Things, Jarreau issued a temporary restraining order against the release of the album. The court initially favored Jarreau, but the label filed an appeal, stating that the album is a studio recording rather than a demo tape. Eventually, the decision was reversed and the album was released in July under the name 1965.

== Track listing ==
Side A
No.	Title	Writer(s)	Length
1.	"My Favorite Things"	Rodgers and Hammerstein	5:02
2.	"Stockholm Sweetnin'"	Quincy Jones	5:50
3.	"A Sleepin' Bee"	Harold Arlen, Truman Capote	5:52
4.	"The Masquerade Is Over"	Allie Wrubel, Herb Magidson	6:34

Side B
No.	Title	Writer(s)	Length
5.	"Sophisticated Lady"	Duke Ellington, Irving Mills, Mitchell Parish	4:14
6.	"Joey, Joey, Joey"	Frank Loesser	3:42
7.	"Come Rain or Come Shine"	Harold Arlen, Johnny Mercer	6:56
8.	"One Note Samba"	Antonio Carlos Jobim, Newton Mendonça	4:24
