= Christmas (Al Jarreau album) =

2008 Al Jarreau album

Christmas was a studio album by Al Jarreau, released in 2008.

== Track listing ==
No.	Title	Writer(s)	Length
1.	"Winter Wonderland"	Felix Bernard, Richard Bernhard Smith	4:20
2.	"Hark the Herald Angels Sing"	Charles Wesley, William Hayman Cummings	3:24
3.	"White Christmas"	Irving Berlin	5:50
4.	"By My Christmas Tree"	traditional	0:29
5.	"Carol of the Bells"	traditional	4:22
6.	"O Come, All Ye Faithful"	John Francis Wade	4:18
7.	"The Christmas Song"	Robert Wells, Mel Tormé	4:55
8.	"I'll Be Home for Christmas"	Kim Gannon, Walter Kent	3:43
9.	"Gloria in excelsis Deo"	traditional	4:35
10.	"Christmas Time Is Here"	Vince Guaraldi, Lee Mendelson	4:27
11.	"Have Yourself a Merry Little Christmas"	Hugh Martin, Ralph Blane	6:16
12.	"Some Children See Him"	Wihla Hutson	4:10
13.	"The Little Christmas Tree"	traditional	3:00
14.	"Up on the Housetop" (hidden track)	Benjamin Hanby	0:30
