= My Old Friend: Celebrating George Duke =

2014 studio album by Al Jarreau

My Old Friend: Celebrating George Duke is a studio album by Al Jarreau, released in 2014, as a tribute to George Duke.

== Track listing ==
No.	Title	Writer(s)	Producer(s)	Length
1.	"My Old Friend" (feat. Gerald Albright)	John Lang, Richard Page, Steve George	John Burk, Stanley Clarke	4:57
2.	"Someday" (feat. Dianne Reeves)	George Duke	John Burk, Marcus Miller	4:21
3.	"Churchyheart (Backyard Ritual)" (feat. Marcus Miller)	Al Jarreau, George Duke	John Burk, Marcus Miller	4:56
4.	"Somebossa (Summer Breezin')" (feat. Gerald Albright)	Al Jarreau, George Duke, Patrick Lundquist	John Burk, Stanley Clarke	4:41
5.	"Sweet Baby" (feat. Lalah Hathaway)	George Duke	John Burk, Stanley Clarke	4:31
6.	"Every Reason to Smile"/"Wings of Love" (feat. Jeffrey Osborne)	George Duke, Jeffrey Osborne, Peter Schless, Stanley Clarke	John Burk, Stanley Clarke	3:51
7.	"No Rhyme, No Reason" (feat. Kelly Price)	George Duke	Boney James	4:05
8.	"Bring Me Joy" (feat. Boney James, George Duke)	George Duke	Boney James	4:36
9.	"Brazilian Love Affair"/"Up from the Sea"/"It Arose and Ate Rio in One Swift Bite" (feat. Dianne Reeves)	George Duke	John Burk, Stanley Clarke	4:46
10.	"You Touch My Brain" (feat. Dr. John)	George Duke	John Burk, Marcus Miller	4:44

== Reception ==
The Guardian calls the album "a relaxed, classy, and honest tribute", while JazzWise gives a positive review as "a beautifully put together tribute album".
