= Heart's Horizon =

Studio album by Al Jarreau
- Released: November 15, 1988
- Studio: Le Gonks West (Los Angeles, California); Westlake Studios (Los Angeles, California); Ocean Way Recording (Hollywood, California); Garden Rake Studio (Studio City, California); Smoketree Ranch (Chatsworth, California); Sorcerer Sound (New York City, New York); Automated Sound (New York City, New York)
- Genre: Smooth jazz, R&B, soul
- Length: 49:48
- Label: Reprise
- Producer: George Duke; Jay Graydon; Philippe Saisse; Dennis Matkosky

Al Jarreau chronology
L Is for Lover (1986)	Heart's Horizon (1988)	Heaven and Earth (1992)

Professional ratings
Review scores
Source	Rating
AllMusic	2.5/5 stars
The Rolling Stone Album Guide	3/5 stars

Heart's Horizon is a studio album by American singer and musician Al Jarreau. It was released in 1988 through Reprise Records. It reached No. 75 on the Billboard 200.

The song "Killer Love" was intended to be used in the film Skin Deep; it was omitted at the last minute.

== Track listing ==
No.	Title	Writer(s)	Producer(s)	Length
1.	"All or Nothing at All"	Bobby Caldwell; Dennis Matkosky	George Duke; Jay Graydon	3:57
2.	"So Good"	Miles Waters; Peter Vale; Sue Shifrin	George Duke	4:35
3.	"All of My Love"	Jeff Pescetto; Mark Mueller; Robin Smith	George Duke	4:37
4.	"Pleasure Over Pain"	Jay Graydon; Randy Goodrum	George Duke; Jay Graydon	5:18
5.	"Yo' Jeans"	Al Jarreau	George Duke; Jay Graydon	1:45
6.	"Way to Your Heart"	Al Jarreau; Gardner Cole; Jay Graydon	George Duke; Jay Graydon	4:42
7.	"One Way"	Billie Hughes; Marcy Levy	George Duke	4:39
8.	"10K Hi"	Al Jarreau; Philippe Saisse	Philippe Saisse	3:43
9.	"I Must Have Been a Fool"	Bill Champlin; Dennis Matkosky	George Duke; Dennis Matkosky	4:09
10.	"More Love"	Jack Segal	George Duke	3:33
11.	"Killer Love"	Al Jarreau; Freddie Lopez; Henry Mancini	George Duke	4:10
12.	"Heart's Horizon"	Al Jarreau; Jay Graydon; Randy Goodrum	George Duke; Jay Graydon	4:40
Total length:				49:48

== Personnel ==
Musicians

- Al Jarreau – lead vocals, Akai MPC60 sampling (8), E-mu Emulator III sampling (8)
- Bobby Caldwell – synthesizers (1)
- George Duke – synthesizer overdubs (1, 2), acoustic piano (2, 7), Yamaha TX816 (3, 10, 11), Roland D-550 (3, 11), Synclavier (3, 4, 6, 7, 9–12), Rhodes electric piano (10), electronic drum pads (10), harmonica (10), keyboards (11), Roland S-50 (11), guitars (11), voice (11)
- Jay Graydon – synthesizers (1, 4, 6, 12)
- Dennis Matkosky – synthesizers (1), Hammond organ (1), Yamaha TX816 (9), Roland D-550 (9), E-mu Emulator III (9), Moog bass (9), drum programming (9)
- John Van Tongeren – synthesizers (1)
- Russell Ferrante – keyboards (2, 3)
- Randy Goodrum – synthesizers (4, 12)
- Gardner Cole – synthesizers (6)
- Philippe Saisse – keyboards (8)
- Bill Champlin – E-mu Emulator II (9)
- Paul Jackson Jr. – guitars (1–4, 6, 11), rhythm guitar (9), acoustic guitar (12)
- Kevin Chokan – guitars (2, 3)
- Michael Landau – guitars (4, 6), lead guitar (9)
- Earl Klugh – acoustic guitar (7)
- "Ready" Freddie Washington – bass guitar (1–3, 9–11), bass overdubs (6)
- Abraham Laboriel – bass guitar (4, 7)
- Stanley Clarke – acoustic bass (12)
- John Robinson – drums (1, 4, 6, 9, 11, 12)
- Ricky Lawson – drums (2, 3, 7)
- Carlos Vega – drums (10)
- Paulinho da Costa – percussion (4, 7, 12)
- Marc Russo – saxophone (1)
- David Sanborn – alto saxophone (2)
- Brandon Fields – saxophone solo (6)
- Dan Higgins – tenor saxophone (11)
- Kirk Whalum – tenor sax solo (11)
- Lew McCreary – trombone (6)
- Bill Reichenbach, Jr. – trombone (6)
- Gary Grant – trumpet (6)
- Jerry Hey – trumpet (6, 11)

Background vocalists

- Bill Champlin – backing vocals (1), BGV arrangements (9)
- Tamara Champlin – backing vocals (1)
- Tommy Funderburk – backing vocals (1)
- Alex Brown – backing vocals (2, 3, 6)
- Carl Carwell – backing vocals (2, 3, 6)
- Lynn Davis – backing vocals (2, 3, 6, 9, 11)
- Phillip Ingram – backing vocals (2)
- Josie James – backing vocals (2, 3, 6, 9)
- Howard Smith – backing vocals (2)
- Bobby McFerrin – lead vocals (5)
- Marcy Levy – backing vocals (7)
- Al Jarreau – backing vocals (8)
- Bobby Kimball – backing vocals (9)
- Phil Perry – backing vocals (9, 11)
- Roy Galloway – backing vocals (11)
- Gene Reed – backing vocals (11)
- Vonda Shepard – backing vocals (11)
- Patricia Unaitis – backing vocals (11)
- Fred White – backing vocals (11)

== Production ==
- George Duke – producer (1–7, 9–12)
- Jay Graydon – producer (1, 4–6, 12)
- Philippe Saisse – producer (8)
- Dennis Matkosky – producer (9)
- Shirley Klein – album coordinator
- Ph.D. – art direction, design
- Ann Field – illustration
- Bonnie Schiffman – photography
- Maria Sarno – stylist
- Patrick Rains & Associates – management

Technical credits

- Bibi Green – production coordinator (recording)
- Stephanie McCravey – production coordinator (mixing)
- Stephen Marcussen – mastering at Precision Lacquer (Hollywood, California)
- Erik Zobler – mixing, recording (1–4, 6, 7, 9–12)
- Jay Graydon – lead vocal recording (1, 4, 12), keyboard recording (1, 4, 12), saxophone recording (6)
- Brian Malouf – recording (5)
- Eric Calvi – recording (8)
- Gary Wagner – recording (8)
- Steve Holroyd – mix assistant
- Kevin Fisher – recording assistant (1–4, 6, 7, 9–12)
- Julie Last – recording assistant (1–4, 6, 7, 9–12)
- Joe Schiff – recording assistant (1–4, 6, 7, 9–12)
- Kristin Connolly – recording assistant (5, 8)
- Shawna Stobie – recording assistant (5, 8)
- Mike Burns – keyboard technician

== Chart history ==
Chart (1989)	Peak position
German Albums (Offizielle Top 100)	33
Norwegian Albums (VG-lista)	19
US Billboard 200	75
US Top R&B/Hip-Hop Albums (Billboard)	10
