= Glow (Al Jarreau album) =

Studio album by Al Jarreau
- Released: June 15, 1976
- Recorded: February 1976 – May 1976
- Studio: Sound Labs and Capitol Studios (Hollywood, California)
- Genre: R&B; jazz; soft rock
- Length: 36:15
- Label: Reprise
- Producer: Tommy LiPuma; Al Schmitt

Al Jarreau chronology
We Got By (1975)	Glow (1976)	Look to the Rainbow (1977)

Professional ratings
Review scores
Source	Rating
Christgau's Record Guide	C+
The Encyclopedia of Popular Music	2/5 stars
The Rolling Stone Album Guide	2/5 stars

Glow is the second solo album by Al Jarreau, released in 1976.

== Track listing ==
All tracks are written by Al Jarreau except where noted.

No.	Title	Writer(s)	Length
1.	"Rainbow in Your Eyes"	Leon Russell	4:30
2.	"Your Song"	Elton John, Bernie Taupin	5:38
3.	"Água de Beber"	Antônio Carlos Jobim, Vinicius de Moraes	3:57
4.	"Have You Seen The Child"		3:48
5.	"Hold on Me"		1:47
6.	"Fire and Rain"	James Taylor	4:49
7.	"Somebody's Watching You"	Sylvester Stewart	3:48
8.	"Milwaukee"		4:57
9.	"Glow"		5:07

== Personnel ==
- Al Jarreau – vocals, all effects (5)
- Tom Canning – electric piano (1–4, 6–9)
- Larry Nash – synthesizers (1, 7), ARP String Ensemble (1)
- Joe Sample – acoustic piano (2, 6), organ (4)
- Larry Carlton – guitars (1–4, 6–9)
- Wilton Felder – bass (1, 3, 4)
- Willie Weeks – bass (2, 6, 7, 9)
- Paul Stallworth – bass (8)
- Joe Correro – drums (1–4, 6–9)
- Steve Forman – percussion (1, 3), tambourine (4)
- Ralph MacDonald – percussion (6–9)
- Nick DeCaro – vocal arrangements (1)
- Dale Oehler – string and synthesizer arrangements, conductor

=== Production ===
- Tommy LiPuma – producer
- Al Schmitt – producer, engineer, mixing
- Don Henderson – assistant engineer
- Linda Tyler – assistant engineer
- Doug Sax – mastering at The Mastering Lab (Hollywood, California)
- Noel Newbolt – production assistant
- Calbalka Studio – art direction, design
- Moshe Brahka – photography
- Susan Jarreau – photography
- Patrick Rains – management

== Charts ==
Glow peaked at #132 and #30 on the Billboard 200 on the Soul LP charts respectively.

The only single to be released and make the charts was "Rainbow in Your Eyes" reaching number 92 on the R&B charts.

=== Album ===
Chart (1976)	Peak position
U.S. Billboard 200	132
US R&B/Soul	30

=== Charting singles ===
Year	Song	Peak chart positions
Year	Song	US R&B
1976	"Rainbow in Your Eyes"	92

== Production ==
- Producers – Tommy LiPuma and Al Schmitt
- Production Assistant – Noel Newbolt
- Engineer – Al Schmitt
- Assistant Engineers – Don Henderson and Linda Tyler
- Recorded at Capitol Studios and Sound Labs (Hollywood, CA).
- Mixed at Capitol Studios.
- Mastered by Doug Sax at The Mastering Lab (Hollywood, CA).
- Design – John Calbaka
- Photography – Moshe Brakha and Susan Jarreau
- Management – Patrick Rains
