= Shrek Forever After (soundtrack) =

2010 film soundtrack album

Shrek Forever After: Music from the Motion Picture

Soundtrack album by various artists
- Released: May 18, 2010
- Recorded: 2009–2010
- Genre: Soundtrack
- Length: 33:47
- Labels: DGC, Interscope

Shrek Forever After (Music from the Motion Picture) is the soundtrack album to the 2010 DreamWorks Animation film Shrek Forever After, the fourth installment in the Shrek franchise and a sequel to Shrek the Third (2007). The album was released on May 18, 2010, via DGC and Interscope.

== Background ==
The soundtrack for Shrek Forever After, like their predecessors, featured licensed songs from contemporary songs. However, it does not feature a cover by Eddie Murphy nor a song by Eels. Instead, a cover of the Monkees' "I'm a Believer" was performed by Weezer for this film. Incidentally, the song was covered by Smash Mouth and Murphy for Shrek (2001). Other featuring artists include Lionel Richie, the Carpenters, Beastie Boys, Mike Simpson from the Dust Brothers, Scissor Sisters, Landon Pigg and Lucy Schwartz. Antonio Banderas had covered "One Love" by the Wailers. The album also accompanied short dialogue bits from the film.

== Reception ==
Shaheema Barodiem of News24 wrote "The interesting thing about the Shrek Forever After soundtrack is that it plays like a radio session, hosted by Rumpelstiltskin (helpfully called The Rumpelstiltskin Show on RMPL) with interludes between the songs that include a phone-in to the show from Pinocchio whose request is that everyday is his birthday, and in-studio guest Captain Hook hamming it up on air. Usually soundtracks that are littered with soundbites from the movie can start to wear me down, but here it's packaged a very entertaining, very cheeky bit of mucking about in Far Far Away."

== Track listing ==
No.	Title	Artist	Length
1.	"It's the Rumpelstiltskin Show!" (skit)		0:30
2.	"Isn't It Strange"	Scissor Sisters	2:18
3.	"Tough Love for Baba" (skit)		0:12
4.	"One Love"	Antonio Banderas	2:50
5.	"Sunshine and Rainbows" (skit)		0:19
6.	"Top of the World"	The Carpenters	2:58
7.	"Cupcake Party" (skit)		0:19
8.	"Rumpel's Party Palace"	Mike Simpson (Fugue in G minor, BWV 578)	1:33
9.	"Pinocchio Gets His Wish" (skit)		0:39
10.	"Click Click (originally by the Beat)"	Light FM featuring Lloyd Hemmings	1:32
11.	"Gingy's Lil' Sugar" (skit)		0:20
12.	"Darling I Do"	Landon Pigg and Lucy Schwartz	3:24
13.	"Shake Your Groove Thing"	Mike Simpson	1:34
14.	"Hello"	Lionel Richie	4:08
15.	"Birthday Bash" (skit)		0:30
16.	"Sure Shot"	Beastie Boys	3:19
17.	"Hook's Garrrrden" (skit)		0:24
18.	"Right Back Where We Started From"	Maxine Nightingale	3:13
19.	"Wheezer Wig" (skit)		0:16
20.	"I'm a Believer"	Weezer	2:59
21.	"Home to Fifi" (skit)		0:30
Total length:			33:47

== Commercial performance ==
The soundtrack was less successful than its predecessors, selling only 9,000 units in the United States. This was largely attributed to the decline of animated soundtracks in sales and revenue during the early 2010s.

== Chart positions ==
Chart (2010)	Peak position
Greek Albums (IFPI)	35

Chart (2023)	Peak position
Hungarian Albums (MAHASZ)	36
