= Heaven and Earth (Al Jarreau album) =

Studio album by Al Jarreau
- Released: June 22, 1992
- Studio: Tarpan Studios (San Rafael, California)
- Genre: Vocal jazz; R&B
- Length: 46:59
- Label: Reprise
- Producer: Narada Michael Walden; Louis Biancaniello; Frank Martin

Al Jarreau chronology
Heart's Horizon (1988)	Heaven and Earth (1992)	Tenderness (1994)

Heaven and Earth is a studio album by Al Jarreau. It was produced by Narada Michael Walden and Louis Biancaniello. The album won Jarreau the Grammy Award for Best R&B Vocal Performance, Male, in 1993. Essentially a collection of R&B songs produced with the artist's jazz and pop sensibilities in mind, Heaven and Earth contains a two-part cover of the Miles Davis tune "Blue in Green", from Davis's Kind of Blue, that demonstrates Jarreau's considerable prowess as a vocal interpreter and scat singer.

== Track listing ==
1. "What You Do to Me" – 4:35 (Larry Batiste, Louis Biancaniello, Claytoven Richardson, Narada Michael Walden)
2. "It's Not Hard to Love You" – 6:11 (Sally Jo Dakota, Skyler Jett, Kevin Walden, Narada Michael Walden)
3. "Blue Angel" – 5:08 (Jett, Jennifer Miro, Narada Michael Walden)
4. "Heaven and Earth" – 4:27 (Louis Biancaniello, Linda Biancaniello)
5. "Superfine Love" – 5:24 (Louis Biancaniello, Jeffrey Cohen, Narada Michael Walden)
6. "Whenever I Hear Your Name" – 5:28 (Cohen, Walden)
7. "Love of My Life" – 4:01 (Jarreau, Jett, Miro, Walden)
8. "If I Break" – 5:47 (Jarreau, Mike Mani, Walden)
9. "(Blue in Green) Tapestry; The Dedication" – 2:53 (Miles Davis, Jarreau)
10. "(Blue in Green) Tapestry; The Dance" – 3:27 (Davis, Jarreau)

== Personnel ==
- Al Jarreau – lead vocals, backing vocals (5, 6, 8), vocal percussion (10)
- Louis "King Pin" Biancaniello – keyboards (1–4, 7), programming (1–4, 7), sampling (1), synthesizers (2, 4, 7), organ (3), horns (3), bass (3), synth solo (4), synth bass (5), additional keyboards (8), additional programming (8)
- Frank "Killer Bee" Martin – acoustic piano (5, 9, 10), acoustic piano solo (5), keyboards (6), synthesizers (6), flute (6)
- Mike Mani – keyboards (8), programming (8), "spooky elements" (8)
- Vernon "Ice" Black – guitars (1)
- Corrado Rustici – guitars (5)
- Myron Dove – electric bass (1)
- Joel Smith – electric bass (2, 7, 10)
- Jeff Chambers – acoustic bass (9)
- Narada Michael Walden – drums, synthesizers (5)
- Marquinho Brazil – percussion (5)
- Dan Higgins – saxophones (1)
- Jerry Hey – trumpet (1)
- Robbie Kwock – trumpet (5)
- Paul McCandless – oboe (8)
- Kitty Beethoven – backing vocals (1, 2)
- Nikita Germaine – backing vocals (1, 7)
- Sandy Griffith – backing vocals (1, 2, 7), spoken parts (2)
- Skyler Jett – backing vocals (1–3, 7, 8)
- Claytoven Richardson – backing vocals (1–4, 7, 8)
- Chris Hawkins – backing vocals (2)
- Raz Kennedy – backing vocals (3)
- Tony Lindsay – backing vocals (4, 6, 8)
- Jeanie Tracy – backing vocals (4)
- Rebecca West – backing vocals (4)
- Boni Boyer – lead backing vocals (7)

Music arrangements

- Narada Michael Walden – rhythm arrangements (1–9), vocal arrangements (3, 6)
- Louis Biancaniello – horn arrangements (1), synthesizer arrangements (3)
- Al Jarreau – vocal arrangements (1)
- Claytoven Richardson – vocal arrangements (1)
- Frank Martin – synthesizer arrangements (5), rhythm arrangements (6), string arrangements (6, 8–10), conductor (8–10)
- Mike Mani – synthesizer arrangements (8)

== Production ==
- Narada Michael Walden – producer
- Louis Biancaniello – co-producer (1, 4)
- Frank Martin – associate producer (6), co-producer (9, 10)
- David Frazer – recording, mixing
- Jeff Gray – assistant engineer
- Marc Reyburn – additional engineer
- Janice Lee – production coordinator
- Kelly McRae – production coordinator
- Cynthia Shiloh – production coordinator
- Kevin Walden – production coordinator
- Robby Scharf – project coordinator
- Deborah Norcross – art direction
- Hard Werken (Los Angeles, California) – design
- Merlyn Rosenberg – photography
- Patrick Rains & Associates – management
