= Tenderness (Al Jarreau album) =

Live album by Al Jarreau
- Released: 1994
- Recorded: May–December 1993
- Studio: Sir Film Stage in Los Angeles, The Hit Factory in New York
- Genre: Soul; jazz; funk
- Length: 1 hr 12 min
- Label: Reprise Records
- Producer: Marcus Miller

Al Jarreau chronology
Heaven and Earth (1992)	Tenderness (1994)	Tomorrow Today (2000)

Tenderness is a live album by Al Jarreau, released in 1994 by Reprise Records. Although officially a live album, it was recorded in studio in front of an invited audience. The album is a compilation of some of Jarreau's older recordings like "We Got By" and "You Don't See Me", covers of artists such as Elton John and Carole King and the Beatles, and more recent pieces from Jarreau's catalogue.

== Critical reception ==
Professional ratings
Review scores
Source	Rating
AllMusic	4/5 stars
Music Week	3/5 stars

AllMusic wrote that Jarreau "turned himself loose on the songs with a freedom that hasn't been heard extensively on his records since the '70s."

== Track listing ==
No.	Title	Writer(s)	Length
1.	"Mas Que Nada"	Jorge Ben Jor	5:14
2.	"Try A Little Tenderness"	Jimmy Campbell, Reginald Connelly, Harry Woods	7:36
3.	"Your Song"	Elton John, Bernie Taupin	6:05
4.	"My Favorite Things"	Oscar Hammerstein II, Richard Rodgers	5:21
5.	"She's Leaving Home"	John Lennon, Paul McCartney	7:39
6.	"Summertime"	George Gershwin, Ira Gershwin, DuBose Heyward	6:17
7.	"We Got By"	Al Jarreau	6:04
8.	"Save Your Love For Me"	Buddy Johnson	5:55
9.	"You Don't See Me"	Jarreau	5:27
10.	"Wait For The Magic"	Todd Urbanos	5:52
11.	"Dinosaur"	Jarreau, Marcus Miller, Robby Scharf	5:24
12.	"Go Away Little Girl"	Gerry Goffin, Carole King	5:43

== Personnel ==
- Al Jarreau – lead vocals, vocal percussion (1, 6, 9, 11, 12), backing vocals (5, 7), vocal arrangements
- Joe Sample – acoustic piano (1, 3–6, 10–12), Fender Rhodes (2, 7–9)
- Philippe Saisse – synthesizers
- Neil Larsen – Hammond organ (2, 5), Fender Rhodes (5)
- Jason Miles – additional synthesizers (4), synthesizer programming (11)
- Eric Gale – acoustic guitar (1, 7, 10), electric guitar (2, 3, 5, 6, 8, 9, 11, 12)
- Paul Jackson, Jr. – additional guitars (1)
- Marcus Miller – bass guitar, arrangements
- Steve Gadd – drums
- Paulinho da Costa – percussion (1–3, 5–12)
- Bashiri Johnson – percussion (4)
- Don Alias – percussion (11)
- Michael Brecker – tenor saxophone (4)
- David Sanborn – alto saxophone (6, 7)
- Kenny Garrett – alto saxophone (8)
- Michael "Patches" Stewart – trumpet (1, 2, 5, 6, 8, 9)
- Jeffrey Ramsey – backing vocals (1, 3, 5, 7, 9), BGV arrangements (9)
- Sharon Young – backing vocals (1, 3, 5, 7, 9), lead vocals (5)
- Kathleen Battle – lead vocals (4)
- Stacy Campbell – backing vocals (5)

=== Production ===
- Producer – Marcus Miller
- Production Coordinator – Robby Scharf
- Production Supervisor – Bibi Green
- Engineers – Guy Charbonneau (Tracks 1–3, 5–10 & 12); Bruce Miller (Track 4); James Farber (Track 11).
- Additional Engineers – Jeff DeMoris, Charles Essers, Joe Ferla, Tim Jaquette, Tom Mahn, Marcus Miller, Brian Scheuble and Christian Wicht.
- Assistant Engineers – Charlie Bouis, Bino Espinoza, John Hendrickson, Aaron Kropf, Tanya McGinnis, Luis Quine, Andy Smith, Brian Vibberts, Michael White, Dann Wojnar and Bruno Young.
- Mixed by Bill Schnee at Schnee Studios, Andora Studios and Ocean Way Recording (Hollywood, California).
- Mastered by Doug Sax at The Mastering Lab (Hollywood, California).
- Art Direction and Design – Greg Ross
- Photography – Henry Diltz, Gene Kirkland and Michael Wilson.
- Management – Patrick Rains & Associates
