= Al Jarreau =

American singer (1940–2017)

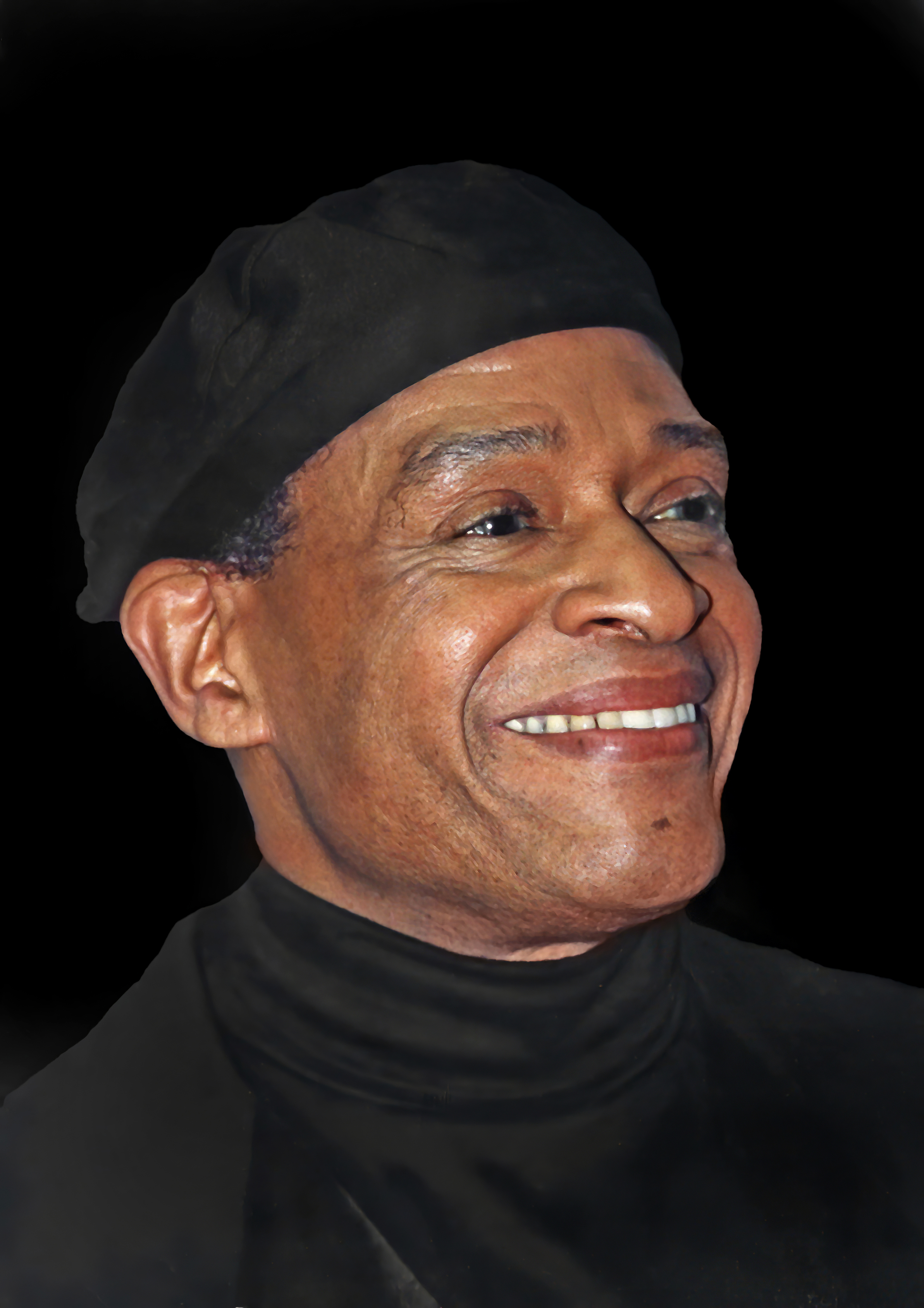
- Jarreau in 1997

Background information
- Born: Alwin Lopez Jarreau; March 12, 1940; Milwaukee, Wisconsin, U.S.
- Died: February 12, 2017 (aged 76) Los Angeles, California, U.S.
- Education: Ripon College; University of Iowa
- Genres: R&B; soul; pop; jazz
- Occupations: Singer; songwriter
- Instruments: Vocals; vocal percussion
- Years active: 1961–2017
- Labels: Reprise; Warner Bros.; Concord; Rhino; Verve
- Website: Official website

Alwin Lopez Jarreau (March 12, 1940 – February 12, 2017) was an American singer. His 1981 album Breakin' Away spent two years on the Billboard 200 and is considered one of the finest examples of the Los Angeles pop and R&B sound. The album won Jarreau the 1982 Grammy for Best Male Pop Vocal Performance. In all, he won ten Grammy Awards and was nominated 19 other times during his career.

Jarreau also sang the theme song of the 1980s television series Moonlighting and was among the performers on the 1985 charity song "We Are the World".

== Early life and career ==
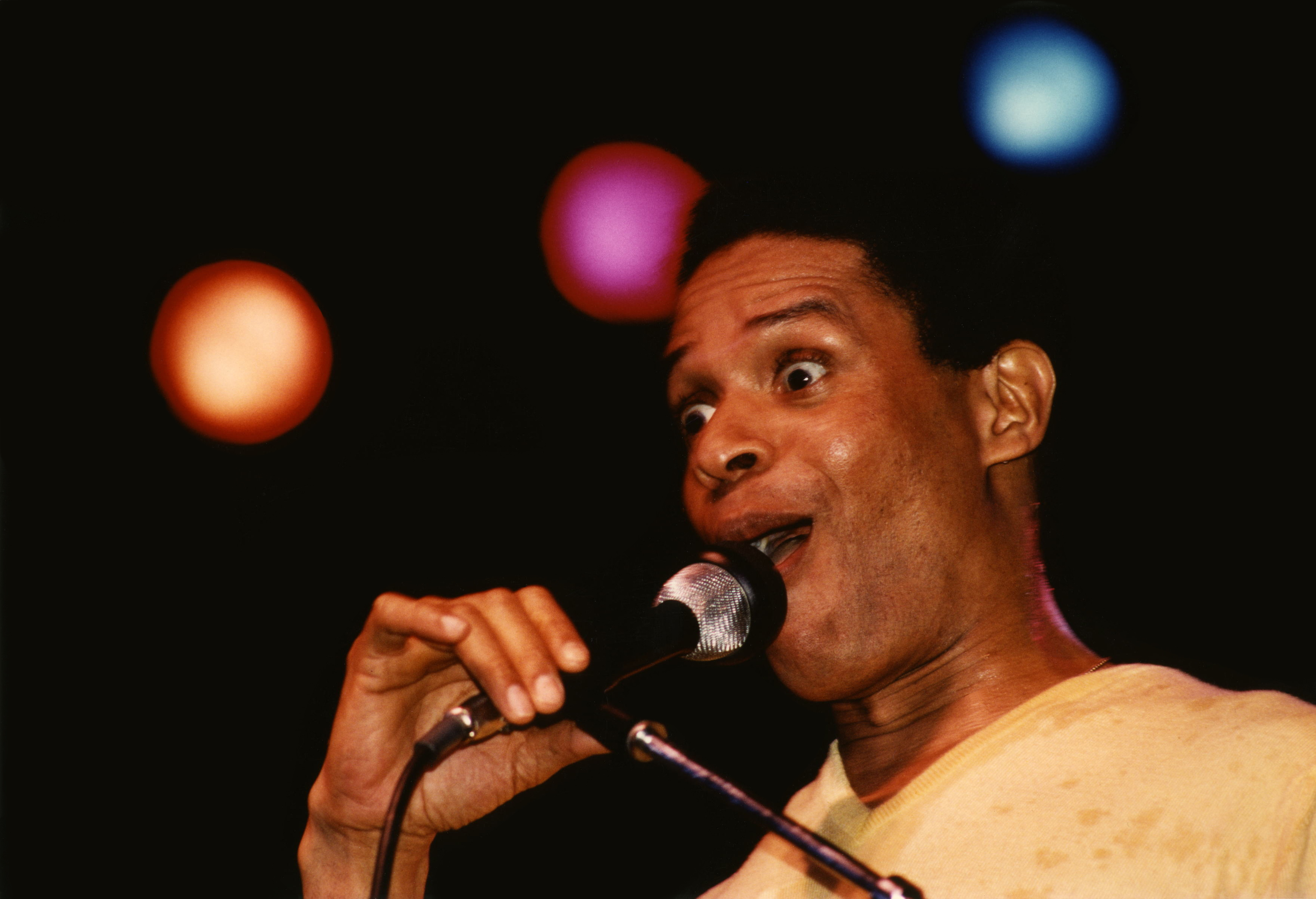
Al Jarreau during a concert at the Philipshalle, Düsseldorf, in early 1981

Jarreau was born in Milwaukee on March 12, 1940, the fifth of six children. His father Emile Alphonse Jarreau was a Seventh-day Adventist Church minister and singer, and his mother Pearl (Walker) Jarreau was a church pianist. Jarreau and his family sang together in church concerts and in benefits, and Jarreau and his mother performed at PTA meetings.

Jarreau was student council president and Badger Boys State delegate for Lincoln High School. At Boys State, he was elected governor. Jarreau went on to attend Ripon College, where he also sang with a group called the Indigos. He graduated in 1962 with a Bachelor of Science degree in psychology. Two years later, in 1964, he earned a master's degree in vocational rehabilitation from the University of Iowa. Jarreau also worked as a rehabilitation counselor in San Francisco, and moonlighted with a jazz trio headed by George Duke. In 1967, he joined forces with acoustic guitarist Julio Martinez. The duo became the star attraction at a small Sausalito nightclub called Gatsby's. This success contributed to Jarreau's decision to make professional singing his life and full-time career.

== Career ==
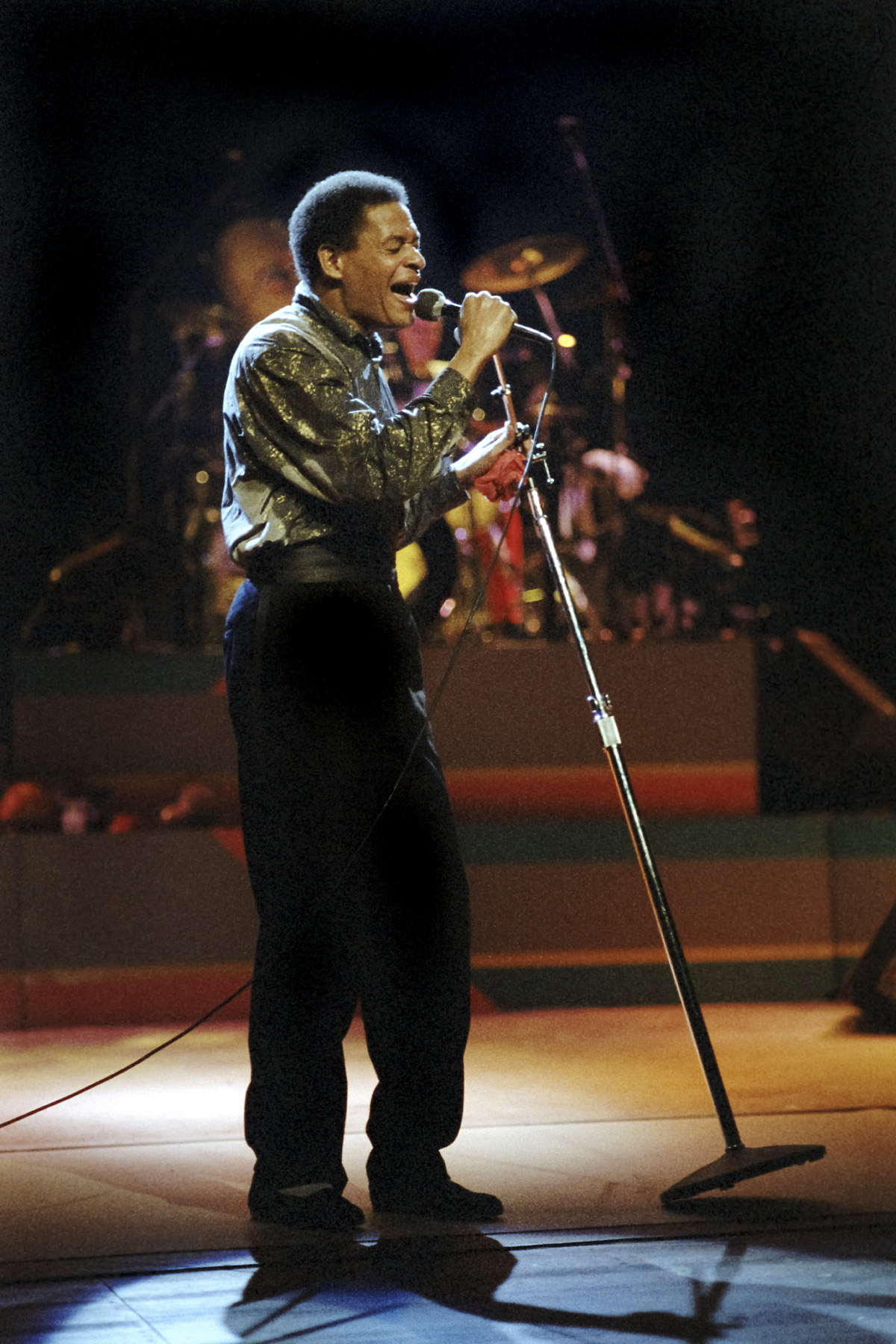
1986: Jarreau in concert in West Berlin

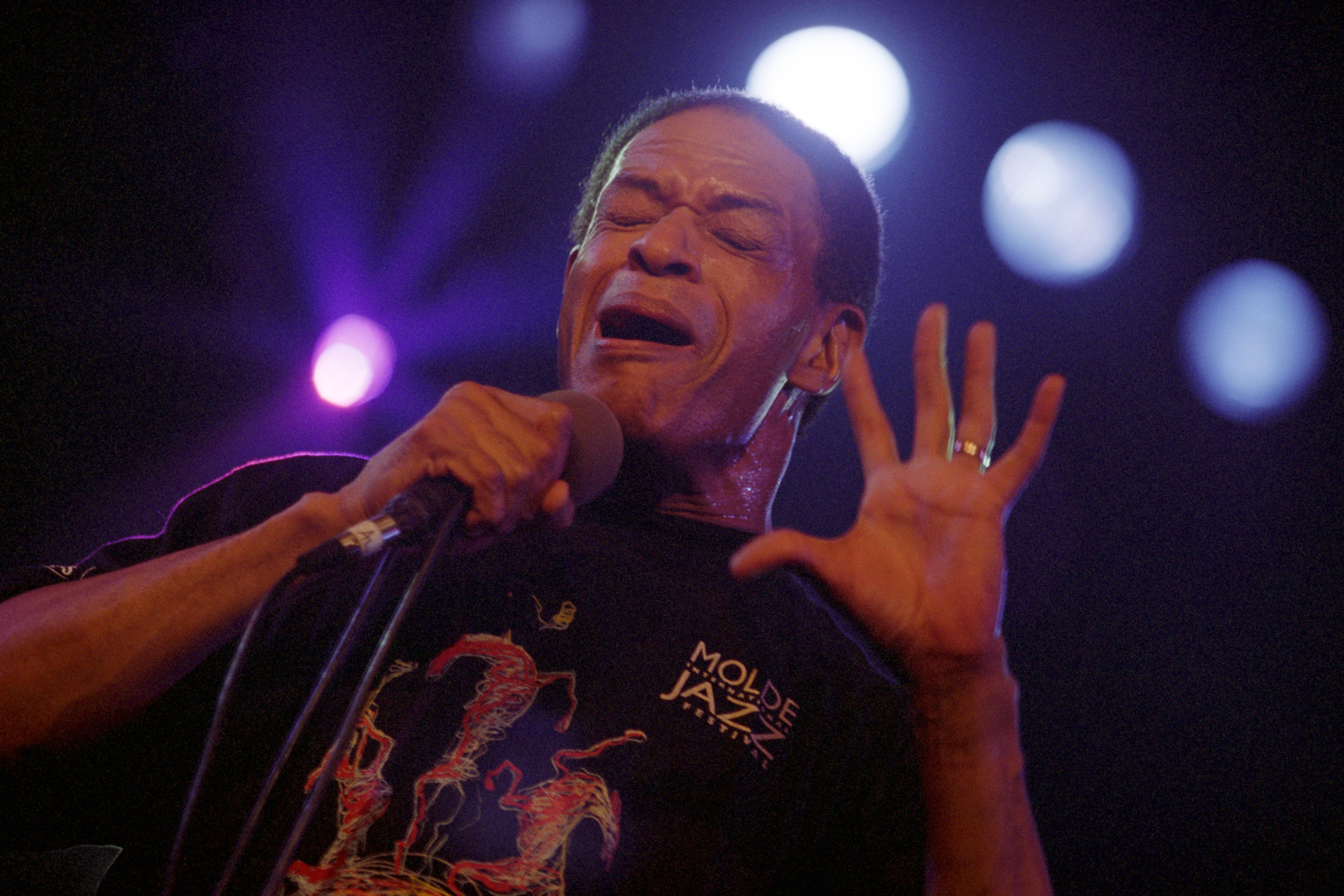
1996: Jarreau performing at the Molde International Jazz Festival

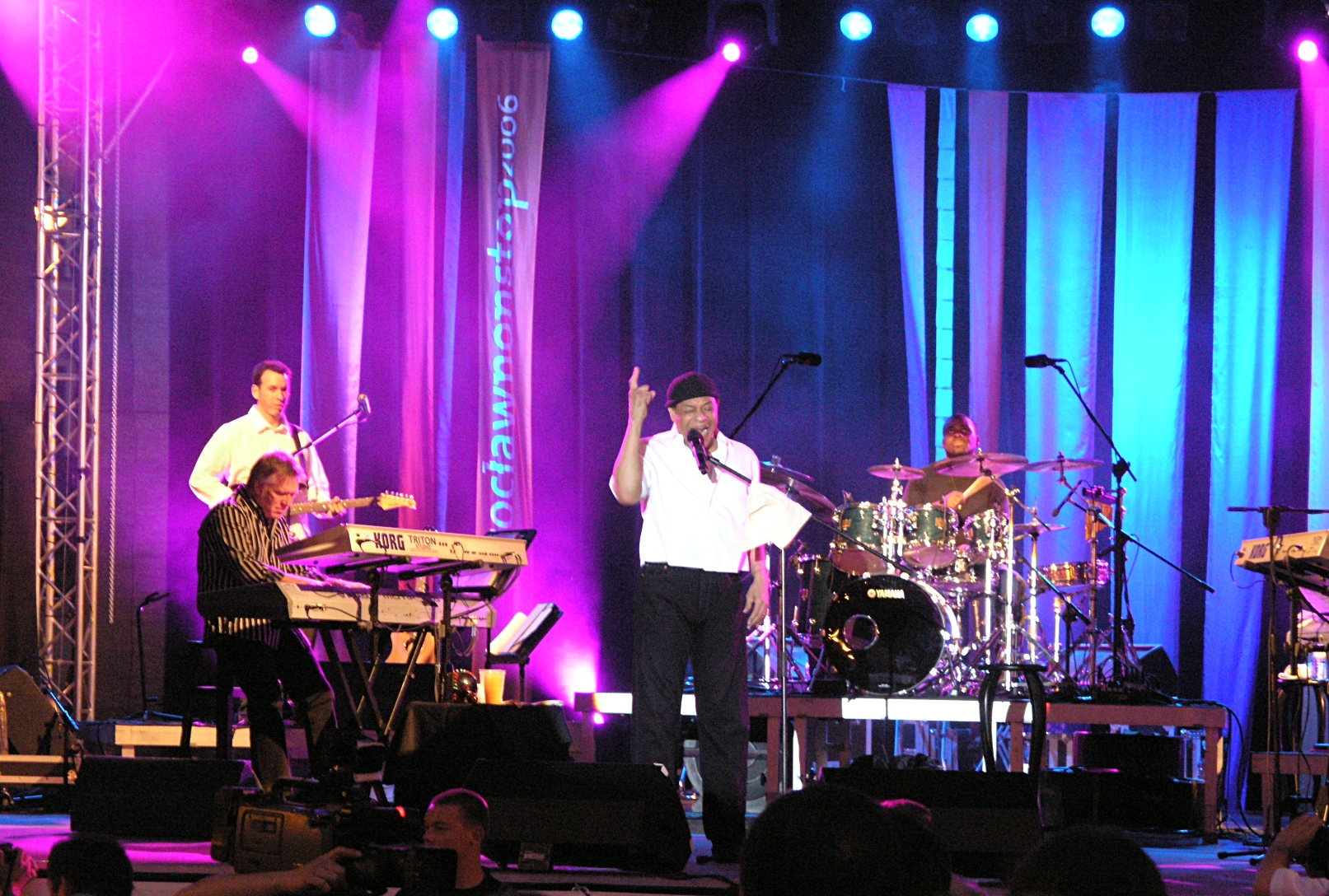
2006: Jarreau in Wrocław

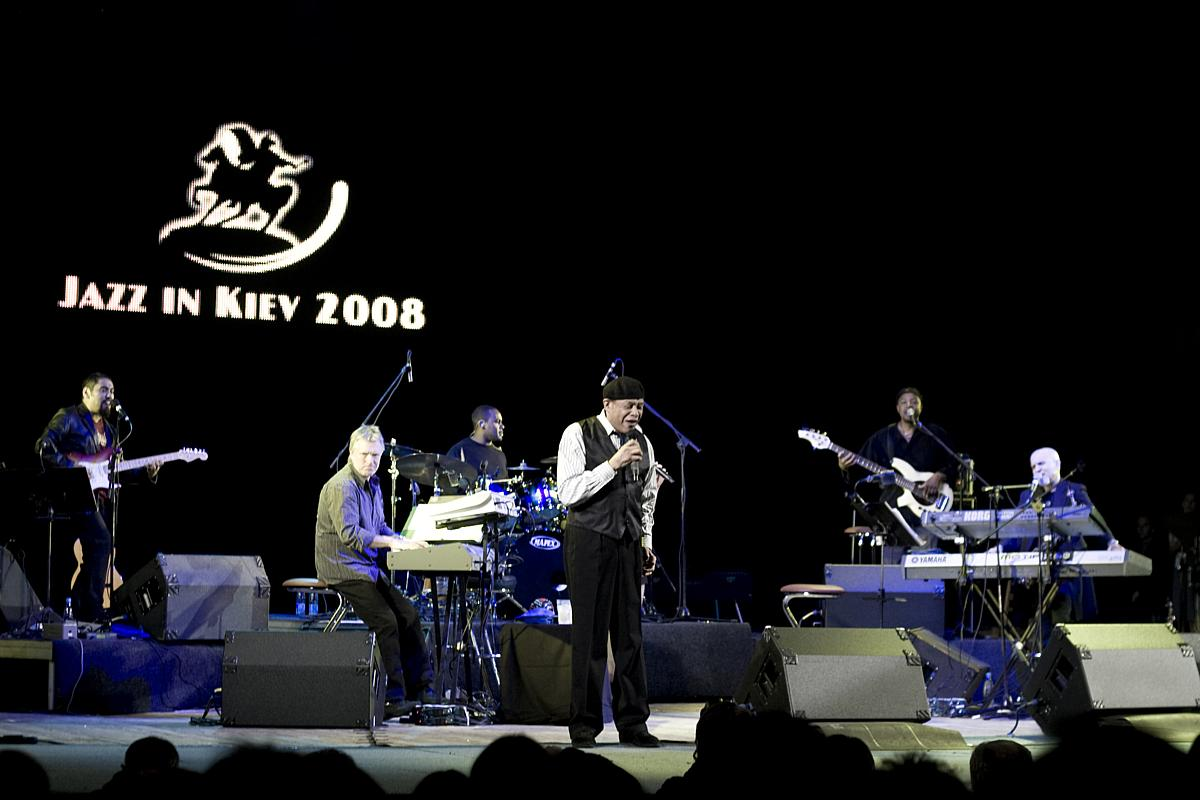
2008: Jarreau in Kyiv

In 1968, Jarreau made jazz his primary occupation. In 1969, he and Martinez headed south, where Jarreau appeared at Dino's, The Troubadour, and Bitter End West. Television exposure came from Johnny Carson, Mike Douglas, Merv Griffin, Dinah Shore, and David Frost. He expanded his nightclub appearances, performing at The Improv between the acts of such rising stars as Bette Midler, Jimmie Walker, and John Belushi. During this period, he became involved with the United Church of Religious Science and the Church of Scientology. Also, roughly at the same time, he began writing his own lyrics, finding that his Christian spirituality began to influence his work.

In 1975, Jarreau was working with pianist Tom Canning when he was spotted by Warner Bros. Records. Soon he released his critically acclaimed debut album, We Got By, which catapulted him to international fame and won an Echo Award (the German equivalent of the Grammys in the United States). On Valentine's Day 1976, he sang "We Got By" from his debut album and "Somebody's Watching You" from his yet to be released "Glow" on the 13th episode of NBC's Saturday Night Live, that week hosted by Peter Boyle. A second Echo Award would follow with the release of his second album, Glow. In 1978, he won his first Grammy Award for Best Jazz Vocal Performance for his album, Look to the Rainbow.

One of Jarreau's most commercially successful albums is Breakin' Away (1981), which includes the hit song "We're in This Love Together". He won the 1982 Grammy Award for Best Male Pop Vocal Performance for Breakin' Away. In 1983 he released Jarreau. It was his third consecutive No. 1 album on the Billboard Jazz charts, while also placing at No. 4 on the R&B albums chart and No. 13 on the Billboard 200. The album contained three hit singles: "Mornin'" (U.S. Pop No. 21, AC No. 2 for three weeks), "Boogie Down" (U.S. Pop No. 77) and "Trouble in Paradise" (U.S. Pop No. 63, AC No. 10). In 1984 the album received four Grammy Award nominations, including for Jay Graydon as Producer of the Year (Non-Classical).

In 1984, his single "After All" reached No. 69 on the US Hot 100 chart and No. 26 on the R&B chart. His last big hit was the Grammy-nominated theme to the 1980s American television show Moonlighting, for which he wrote the lyrics. Among other things, he was well known for his extensive use of scat singing (for which he was called "Acrobat of Scat"), and vocal percussion. He was also a featured vocalist on USA for Africa's "We Are the World" in which he sang the line: "...and so we all must lend a helping hand." Another charitable media event, HBO's Comic Relief, featured him in a duet with Natalie Cole singing the song "Mr. President", written by Joe Sterling, Mike Loveless, and Ray Reach.

Jarreau took an extended break from recording in the 1990s. As he explained in an interview with Jazz Review: "I was still touring, in fact, I toured more than I ever had in the past, so I kept in touch with my audience. I got my symphony program under way, which included my music and that of other people too, and I performed on the Broadway production of Grease. I was busier than ever! For the most part, I was doing what I have always done... perform live. I was shopping for a record deal and was letting people know that there is a new album coming. I was just waiting for the right label (Verve), but I toured more than ever." In 2003, Jarreau and conductor Larry Baird collaborated on symphony shows around the United States, with Baird arranging additional orchestral material for Jarreau's shows.

Jarreau toured and performed with Joe Sample, Chick Corea, Kathleen Battle, Miles Davis, George Duke, David Sanborn Rick Braun, and George Benson. He also performed the role of the Teen Angel in a 1996 Broadway production of Grease. On March 6, 2001, he received a star on the Hollywood Walk of Fame, at 7083 Hollywood Boulevard on the corner of Hollywood Boulevard and La Brea Avenue. In 2006, Jarreau appeared in a duet with American Idol finalist Paris Bennett during the Season 5 finale and on Celebrity Duets singing with actor Cheech Marin. In 2009, children's author Carmen Rubin published the story Ashti Meets Birdman Al, inspired by Jarreau's music.

In 2010, Jarreau was a guest on a Eumir Deodato album, with the song "Double Face" written by Jarreau, Deodato, and Nicolosi. The song was produced by the Italian company Nicolosi Productions. On February 16, 2012, Jarreau was invited to the Italian Festival di Sanremo to sing with the group Matia Bazar.

== Personal life ==
Jarreau was married twice. Jarreau and Phyllis Hall were married from 1964 until their divorce in 1968. Jarreau married his second wife Susan Elaine Player in 1977. Jarreau and Player had a son, Ryan Jarreau.

Ryan and Susan Jarreau appear as background vocalists on Tomorrow Today. Susan provided photography for several of Jarreau's albums, including Glow, All Fly Home, This Time, and Breakin' Away. She is the subject of "Susan's Song", track no. 3 on We Got By.

== Death ==
Jarreau died of respiratory failure, at the age of 76 on February 12, 2017 just two days after announcing his retirement. He is interred in Forest Lawn Memorial Park in the Hollywood Hills. His headstone features lyrics from his song "Mornin'": "Like any man / I can reach out my hand / And touch the face of God."

== Discography ==
- We Got By (1975)
- Glow (1976)
- All Fly Home (1978)
- This Time (1980)
- Breakin' Away (1981)
- 1965 (1982)
- Jarreau (1983)
- High Crime (1984)
- L Is for Lover (1986)
- Heart's Horizon (1988)
- Heaven and Earth (1992)
- Tenderness (1994)
- Tomorrow Today (2000)
- All I Got (2002)
- Accentuate the Positive (2004)
- Givin' It Up (2006)
- Christmas (2008)
- My Old Friend: Celebrating George Duke (2014)

== Awards and nominations ==
=== Grammy Awards ===
Year Awarded	Nominee/work	Category	Result	Ref.
1978	Look to the Rainbow	Best Jazz Vocal Performance	Won	
1979	All Fly Home	Best Jazz Vocal Performance	Won	
1981	"Never Givin' Up"	Best R&B Vocal Performance, Male	Nominated	
1981	In Harmony: A Sesame Street Record (featuring various artists)	Best Recording for Children	Won	
1982	Breakin' Away	Album of the Year (shared with Jay Graydon)	Nominated	
1982	Breakin' Away	Best Pop Vocal Performance, Male	Won	
1982	"(Round, Round, Round) Blue Rondo à la Turk"	Best Jazz Vocal Performance, Male	Won	
1984	Jarreau	Producer of the Year (Non-Classical) (for Jay Graydon)	Nominated	
1984	Jarreau	Best Engineered Recording – Non-Classical (for Ian Eales, Jay Graydon & Eric Prestis)	Nominated	
1984	"Mornin'"	Best Instrumental Arrangement Accompanying Vocal(s) (for David Foster, Jay Graydon & Jeremy Lubbock)	Nominated	
1984	"Step by Step"	Best Instrumental Arrangement Accompanying Vocal(s) (shared with Tom Canning, Jay Graydon & Jerry Hey)	Nominated	
1985	"Edgartown Groove" (featuring Kashif)	Best R&B Performance by a Duo or Group with Vocal	Nominated	
1986	We Are the World (as a part of USA for Africa featuring various artists)	Album of the Year (shared with Quincy Jones)	Nominated	
1986	"We Are the World" (as a part of USA for Africa)	Record of the Year (shared with Quincy Jones)	Won	
1986	"We Are the World" (as a part of USA for Africa)	Best Pop Performance by a Duo or Group With Vocals (shared with Quincy Jones)	Won	
1986	"We Are the World" (as a part of USA for Africa)	Best Music Video, Short Form (shared with Quincy Jones & Tom Trbovich)	Won	
1986	High Crime	Best R&B Vocal Performance, Male	Nominated	
1987	"Since I Fell for You"	Best R&B Vocal Performance, Male	Nominated	
1988	"Moonlighting (theme)" (from the TV series Moonlighting)	Best Pop Vocal Performance, Male	Nominated	
1988	"Moonlighting (theme)" (from the TV series Moonlighting)	Best Song Written Specifically for a Motion Picture or Television (shared with Lee Holdridge)	Nominated	
1990	Heart's Horizon	Best R&B Vocal Performance, Male	Nominated	
1993	Heaven and Earth	Best R&B Vocal Performance, Male	Won	
1995	"Wait for the Magic"	Best R&B Vocal Performance, Male	Nominated	
2005	Accentuate the Positive	Best Jazz Vocal Album	Nominated	
2007	"Breezin'" (featuring George Benson)	Best R&B Performance by a Duo or Group with Vocals	Nominated	
2007	"God Bless the Child" (featuring George Benson & Jill Scott)	Best Traditional R&B Vocal Performance	Won	
2013	Live (featuring the Metropole Orkest)	Best Jazz Vocal Album	Nominated	
2013	"Spain (I Can Recall)"	Best Instrumental Arrangement Accompanying Vocalist(s) (for Vincent Mendoza)	Nominated	
2013	JumpinJazz Kids – A Swinging Jungle Tale (featuring James Murray & various artists)	Best Children's Album	Nominated	

=== Hall of Fame ===
Year Awarded	Category	Ref.
2001	Hollywood Walk of Fame	
2012	SoulMusic Hall of Fame at SoulMusic.com	

=== Honorary degrees ===
Year Awarded	Degree	University	Ref.
1991	Honorary Doctorate of Music	Berklee College of Music	
2004	Honorary Doctorate of Fine Arts	University of Wisconsin–Milwaukee	

=== Academic degrees ===
Year Awarded	Degree	University	Ref.
1962	Bachelor's degree in Psychology	Ripon College	
1964	Master's degree in Rehabilitation Counseling	University of Iowa	

=== Other honors ===
On October 17, 1982, at the invitation of the Milwaukee Brewers, he sang the National Anthem at Game 5 of the 1982 World Series.
