= Look to the Rainbow (Al Jarreau album) =

Live album by Al Jarreau
- Released: May 27, 1977
- Recorded: January – February 1977
- Genres: Jazz; R&B; soul
- Length: 79:15 (original LP); 73:24 (CD version)
- Label: Warner Bros.
- Producers: Al Schmitt, Tommy LiPuma

Al Jarreau chronology
Glow (1976)	Look to the Rainbow (1977)	All Fly Home (1978)

Singles from Look to the Rainbow
- 1. "Take Five" Released: 1977

Look to the Rainbow is a live album by Al Jarreau, released on May 27, 1977, by Warner Bros. Records. It marked a breakthrough for his career in Europe and later also in the US. In 1978 it won the Grammy Award for Best Jazz Vocal Performance.

== Background ==
In 1976 Jarreau made his first live appearances in Europe, starting with concerts at the jazz festivals in Montreux and Berlin. The following year he began his first tour through 16 cities in Europe starting with a gig at Onkel Pö's in Hamburg. Look to the Rainbow is a set of recordings from that tour.

The title song "Look to the Rainbow" is from the musical Finian's Rainbow, a Broadway production from the late 1940s. The most recognized song on this album is Jarreau's interpretation of Paul Desmond's classic jazz number "Take Five", which was also released as a single in an edited version in 1977.

Both tour and album brought him enthusiastic reviews in Germany, where he immediately became a darling of the public, while his recognition in the US remained low until he received his first Grammy in 1978.

== Style ==
Look to the Rainbow is a jazz-oriented album which is characterized by a unique light and open sound. With no guitar or brass instruments, accompanied by Tom Canning's Fender Rhodes (in some places supported by an ARP String Ensemble) and Lynn Blessing's vibraphone, Al Jarreau's voice is the main lead instrument and he uses it intensely as such.

== Critical reception ==
Professional ratings
Review scores
Source	Rating
AllMusic	4.5/5 stars
Melody Maker	favourable
NME	unfavourable
Sounds	4/5 stars

AllMusic states that of the albums from Jarreau's Warner Brothers period, this is "easily the most jazz-oriented". It further cites his abilities "as a brilliant scat singer (able to emulate practically any instrument)" and also a "superior ballad interpreter" as evident on this recording.

Reviews in the UK's music press were mixed. Melody Maker was full of praise for the album, claiming that Jarreau "has taken the seemingly well-worn genre of the freely improvising jazz singer and conjured it, miraculously, back to life". The review observed that "like all the best artists, Jarreau does not work in a vacuum, but as the successor to a great tradition. When he performs, you can hear the expected echoes of King Pleasure and Jon Hendricks, upon whose foundation he is building so sensationally, and you can also hear a number of contemporary singers, mostly black, with whom he is so obviously in touch." It concluded, "There is not one second of the four sides that is not the purest magic... at last, [Jarreau] has an album worthy of his monster talent". Sounds also gave the record a positive review, stating that "Al's always crisply precise: intense but not passionate up until the climax of, say, 'Take Five', when his scat shoots blind/wild, like a flock of demented starlings whizzing round a cage", and describing the album as "a great sophisticates' record, sensual petals of music unfold and furl again with Cartier elegance". However, NME was less enthusiastic, saying that "Look to the Rainbow is a good representation of Jarreau live. It's relaxed and intimate, the mood hardly varies throughout and the pace never gets more frantic than a light, funky backbeat that creeps in for some of the songs... The result is homogenous and patently easy to listen to. Therein lies the problem. If you weren't looking for a memento of Jarreau's concert [...] there wouldn't be much here to attract attention. Jarreau's unusual voice is at first beguiling, but soon becomes gimmicky, like a hipper male version of Cleo Laine. When he gets funky (as on 'So Long Girl') there's little to complain about but on the slower songs the combination of his voice and the milky sentimentality becomes irritating... Look to the Rainbow is too close to MOR for comfort."

In Germany Der Spiegel stated, "In einem Verwirrspiel der Phrasen und Silben werden Tonfiguren zu Sinnträgern, wandeln sich Wörter zu reinem Klang" ("In a deliberately confusing game of phrases and syllables tone-figures become meaning, words transform into pure sound").

Die Zeit was also enthusiastic: "Es sollte nicht wundern, wenn hier der Sammy Davis jr. von morgen die Szene betreten hätte" ("It wouldn't surprise us if we've seen the new Sammy Davis Jr. arrive on the scene").

== Track listing ==
All tracks are written by Al Jarreau except where noted.

No.	Title	Writer(s)	Length
1.	"Letter Perfect"		5:16
2.	"Rainbow in Your Eyes"	Leon Russell	6:17
3.	"One Good Turn"		6:30
4.	"Could You Believe"		6:49
5.	"Burst In with the Dawn"		7:24
6.	"Better Than Anything"	Bill Loughborough, David Wheat	5:08
7.	"So Long Girl"		3:44
8.	"Look to the Rainbow"	Yip Harburg, Burton Lane	7:54
9.	"You Don't See Me"		6:44
10.	"Take Five"	Paul Desmond	7:20
11.	"Loving You"		5:00
12.	"We Got By"		6:57

Note : CD issues feature minor edits to tracks in relation to the original LP release. Official download releases restore the original full-length versions.

== Personnel ==
- Al Jarreau – vocals
- Tom Canning – keyboards
- Abraham Laboriel – bass
- Joe Correro – drums, percussion
- Lynn Blessing – vibraphone

== Production ==
- Producers – Tommy LiPuma and Al Schmitt
- Assistant Producer – Noel Newbolt
- Recorded and Mixed by Al Schmitt
- Assistant Engineers – Don Henderson, Doug Hopkins, Merryn and Tim Summerhayes.
- Mix Assistant – Don Henderson
- Recorded in Europe, January and February 1977.
- Remote Recording by Rak Records Mobile.
- Mixed at Capitol Recording Studios, Hollywood, February and March 1977.
- Mastered by Mike Reese at The Mastering Lab (Hollywood, California).
- Art Direction – John Cabalka
- Design – Eric Monson
- Photography – Gesine Petter, Jim Rakete, Spiller and Valentine.
- Management – Patrick Wm. Rains
- Special Thanks to our Tour Manager, Jerry Levin.
- Susan, Here's a Rainbow

== Charts and awards ==
Chart (1977)	Position
Norwegian Albums (VG-lista)	20
Billboard 200	49
Jazz Albums (Billboard)	5
R&B Albums (Billboard)	19

The album was certified gold by the RIAA on August 24, 2001. The single "Take Five" peaked at #91 R&B Singles in 1977.

In 1978 Al Jarreau won the best Jazz performance Grammy for Look to the Rainbow.

=== Charting singles ===
Year	Song	Peak chart positions
Year	Song	US R&B
1976	"Take Five"	91
