= Jarreau (album) =

Studio album by Al Jarreau
- Released: March 28, 1983
- Recorded: 1982
- Studios: Garden Rake Studios (Studio City); Ocean Way Studios (Los Angeles)
- Genres: Smooth jazz; R&B; soul; funk
- Length: 43:43
- Label: Warner Bros.
- Producer: Jay Graydon

Al Jarreau chronology
Breakin' Away (1981)	Jarreau (1983)	High Crime (1984)

Professional ratings
Review scores
Source	Rating
AllMusic	4/5 stars
The Encyclopedia of Popular Music	3/5 stars
The Rolling Stone Album Guide	3/5 stars

Jarreau is the sixth studio album by Al Jarreau, released in 1983. It was his third consecutive No. 1 album on the Billboard Jazz charts, while also placing at No. 4 on the R&B album charts and No. 13 on the Billboard 200. In 1984, the album received four Grammy Award nominations, including for Jay Graydon as Producer of the Year (Non-Classical).

The album contained three hit singles: "Mornin'" (U.S. Pop No. 21, AC No. 2 for three weeks), "Boogie Down" (U.S. Pop No. 77) and "Trouble in Paradise" (U.S. Pop No. 63, AC No. 10). The first charted during the spring and summer, the second in the summer and the latter charted in the fall.

In 2001, the album was certified platinum by the Recording Industry Association of America. It was remastered and re-released in 2009 by Friday Music.

The song "Black and Blues" has been rearranged for moderate use in marching bands. A condensed version for trombone has also become widely popular in marching/pep bands.

== Track listing ==
Side one
No.	Title	Writer(s)	Length
1.	"Mornin'"	Jarreau; Jay Graydon; David Foster	4:16
2.	"Boogie Down"	Jarreau; Michael Omartian	4:11
3.	"I Will Be Here for You (Nitakungodea Milele)"	Richard Page; Steve George; John Lang	4:19
4.	"Save Me"	Jarreau; Graydon; Foster	6:31

Side two
No.	Title	Writer(s)	Length
5.	"Step by Step"	Jarreau; Graydon; Tom Canning	4:26
6.	"Black and Blues"	Jarreau; Graydon; Canning	4:50
7.	"Trouble in Paradise"	Graydon; Greg Mathieson; Trevor Veitch	3:47
8.	"Not Like This"	Jeremy Lubbock	2:38
9.	"Love Is Waiting"	Jarreau; Graydon; Canning	3:47

Bonus tracks
No.	Title	Writer(s)	Length
10.	"I Keep Callin'"	Jarreau; Graydon; Canning	4:58

== Personnel ==
=== Musicians ===
- Al Jarreau – lead vocals, backing vocals (1, 3–6, 10), rhythm arrangements (5, 6, 9, 10)
- David Foster – Fender Rhodes (1, 4), synthesizers (1, 4), piano (4), rhythm arrangements (1, 4)
- Michael Omartian – synthesizers (2), Fender Rhodes (5), rhythm arrangements (2)
- Steve George – synthesizers (3)
- Robbie Buchanan – Fender Rhodes (3), synthesizers (5)
- Steve Porcaro – synthesizer programming (4)
- Theophilus T. Blood – additional synthesizers (4)
- Tom Canning – synthesizers (5, 6, 9), piano (6), Fender Rhodes (6, 9), synth harmonica solo (6), rhythm arrangements (5, 6, 9, 10)
- Greg Mathieson – piano (7), Fender Rhodes (7), synthesizers (7), rhythm arrangements (7)
- Jeremy Lubbock – Fender Rhodes (8), string arrangements (1, 8)
- George Duke – Fender Rhodes (10), "Wang Bar" synth solo (10)
- Jay Graydon – guitars (1, 3, 4, 7, 9, 10), synthesizers (5, 10), guitar solo (6), rhythm arrangements (1, 3–7, 9, 10)
- Abraham Laboriel – bass (1, 3–7, 9, 10)
- Jeff Porcaro – drums (1, 5, 6), percussion (6)
- Steve Gadd – drums (2–4, 9, 10)
- Grey Trevorson – drums (7)
- Victor Feldman – percussion (2, 3, 5, 10)
- Lew McCreary – trombone (2, 4)
- Bill Reichenbach Jr. – trombone (2, 4–7, 9, 10)
- Charlie Loper – trombone (5–7, 9)
- Chuck Findley – trumpet (2, 4–7, 9, 10), flugelhorn (3)
- Gary Grant – trumpet (2, 4–7, 9, 10), flugelhorn (3)
- Jerry Hey – trumpet (2, 4–7, 9, 10), flugelhorn (3), horn arrangements (2–7, 9, 10)
- Venette Gloud – backing vocals (2)
- Bill Champlin – backing vocals (2)
- Richard Page – backing vocals (2, 10)
- Gerald Vinci – concertmaster (4, 8)

=== Technical ===
- Produced by Jay Graydon
- Associate producer – Tom Canning
- Engineered and mixed by Jay Graydon and Ian Eales at Garden Rake Studios (Studio City, CA)
- Strings recorded by Eric Prestis (1, 8) at Ocean Way Studios (Hollywood, CA)
- Mastered by Steve Hall at Future Disc Systems (Hollywood, CA)
- Music contractor – Ian Eales
- Art direction – Christine Sauers
- Photography – Norman Seeff
- Album coordinator – Shirley Klein
- Management – Patrick Rains & Associates

== Charts ==
Weekly chart performance for Jarreau
Chart (1983)	Peak position
Australian Albums (Kent Music Report)	50
Canada Top Albums/CDs (RPM)	30
German Albums (Offizielle Top 100)	25
Dutch Albums (Album Top 100)	15
Norwegian Albums (VG-lista)	8
New Zealand Albums (RMNZ)	20
Swedish Albums (Sverigetopplistan)	30
UK Albums (Official Charts)	39
US Billboard 200	13
US Top R&B/Hip-Hop Albums (Billboard)	4

== Certifications ==
Country	Certifications
France	Gold
USA	Platinum
