= L Is for Lover =

Studio album by Al Jarreau
- Released: September 8, 1986
- Recorded: 1986
- Studio: Skyline Studios (New York City, New York)
- Genres: R&B; jazz; pop; soul
- Length: 45:01
- Label: Warner Bros.
- Producer: Nile Rodgers

Al Jarreau chronology
In London (1985)	L Is for Lover (1986)	Heart's Horizon (1988)

Singles from L Is for Lover
- 1. "Says" (Germany-only release)" Released: 1986; 2. "Real Tight" (Germany-only release)" Released: 1986; 3. "L Is for Lover" Released: 1986; 4. "Tell Me What I Gotta Do" Released: 1986; 5. "Give a Little More Lovin'" Released: 1986

L Is for Lover is the eighth studio album by American R&B singer Al Jarreau, released on September 8, 1986, by Warner Bros. Records. It peaked at No. 30 on the Billboard Top Soul Albums chart, No. 9 on the Traditional Jazz Albums chart, and No. 17 on the Contemporary Jazz Albums chart.

Nile Rodgers, the album's producer, called it "the best thing I ever made that didn't sell" in the July 27, 2015, issue of New York magazine. "The theme from [the TV series] Moonlighting was on it, but Al and I thought it wasn't cool enough. So we took it off the album. That becomes a hit, and the album sank. Shows what I know." The single version of the Moonlighting theme, originally included on the show's 1987 soundtrack album, was added to Friday Music's 2011 reissue of L Is for Lover along with a remix of the album's title track and the 12-inch extended mix of "Tell Me What I Gotta Do." The Rodgers-produced version of Moonlighting's theme song was used in the opening and closing credits of each episode of the show's fourth (1987–1988) and fifth (1988–1989) seasons.

== Critical reception ==
Professional ratings
Review scores
Source	Rating
AllMusic	4/5 stars
Number One	2/5 stars

Richard S. Ginell of AllMusic called the album "a perhaps surprisingly scintillating collaboration with one of the leading dance-music producer/guitarists of the time, Nile Rodgers (of Chic). Not only did Rodgers and Jarreau assemble some strong tunes from many sources, Rodgers took advantage of Jarreau's rhythmic capabilities, for some of the material is too deliciously complicated for any old R&B soulster to pull off." He added, "Hear the way Jarreau brilliantly threads his way through the rhythmically complex hornet's nest of 'Says' in English and French, or savor the sheer ecstatic energy of the chorus of 'Pleasure' and the rapid-fire list of cities in the title track; this is first-class pop recordmaking."

J. D. Considine of Musician wrote, "It isn't simply that Rodgers reins in the singer's almost freakish virtuosity, although that helps; more to the point, the arrangements provide both focus and contrast for the singing, so that the flash bits truly excite. Best of all, from the EW&F swing of 'Golden Girl' to the Chic-style groove of the title tune, Rodgers ties the vocals so closely to the beat that it's impossible not to be captivated."

== Track listing ==
Side one
No.	Title	Writer(s)	Length
1.	"Tell Me What I Gotta Do"	Jay Graydon; Mike Himelstein; Tom Keane	4:00
2.	"L Is for Lover"	David Gamson; Green Gartside	5:25
3.	"Says"	Al Jarreau; Philippe Saisse	3:51
4.	"Pleasure"	Robert Brookins; Tony Haynes	4:00
5.	"Golden Girl"	Jimmy Felber	5:50

Side two
No.	Title	Writer(s)	Length
6.	"Across the Midnight Sky"	Jay Graydon; Al Jarreau; Richard Page	5:35
7.	"(We Got) Telepathy"	Paul Bliss; Ian Prince	4:27
8.	"Give a Little More Lovin'"	Jonathan Butler; Simon May	5:12
9.	"No Ordinary Romance"	Michael Gregory	3:31
10.	"Real Tight"	Mark Mueller; Robbie Nevil; John Van Tongeren; Brock Walsh	3:10
Total length:			45:01

== Personnel ==
Credits are adapted from the L Is for Lover liner notes.

- Al Jarreau – lead vocals, backing vocals (2, 7, 10), vocoder (10)
- Philippe Saisse – keyboards, keyboard bass (3, 4, 6, 7, 9), acoustic piano solo (5), Synclavier horns (10)
- Kevin Jones – Synclavier programming
- Peter Scherer – keyboard bass (5, 10), keyboards (9, 10)
- Nile Rodgers – guitars, keyboard bass (1, 2), keyboards (2), backing vocals (2, 4, 5, 7, 8, 10), vocoder (10)
- Hiram Bullock – guitars (4, 8), guitar solo (8)
- Anthony Jackson – bass guitar (6, 8)
- Jimmy Bralower – drums (1, 2), percussion (1, 2)
- Steve Ferrone – second hi-hat cymbal (2), drums (3–10)
- Leonard Gibbs – percussion (1, 3, 5–10)
- Mac Gollehon – brass (1, 9)
- Robert Aaron – reeds (1, 9)
- Tawatha Agee – backing vocals (2, 3, 6, 7, 10)
- Lisa Fischer – backing vocals (2, 7, 10)
- Diane Garisto – backing vocals (2, 7, 10)
- Terri Gonzalez – backing vocals (2, 8)
- Brenda King – backing vocals (2, 4, 5, 7, 8, 10)
- Curtis King – backing vocals (2–8, 10)
- Michelle Cobbs – backing vocals (3–6, 8)
- Fonzi Thornton – backing vocals (3, 6)
- Cindy Mizelle – backing vocals (4, 5, 8)

== Production ==
- Nile Rodgers – producer
- James Farber – recording, mixing
- Scott Ansell – second engineer
- Tom Durack – additional second engineer
- Barry Diament – digital editing at Atlantic Studios (New York, NY)
- Bob Ludwig – digital mastering at Masterdisk (New York, NY)
- Kevin Jones – production manager
- Budd Tunick – production manager
- Shirley Klein – album coordinator
- Jeffrey Kent Ayeroff – art direction
- Michael Hodgson – art direction, design
- Paul Jasmin – photography
- Maria Sarno for Dangerous Wardrobe – styling
- Patrick Rains & Associates (Los Angeles, California) – management

== Charts ==
Year	Chart	Position
1986	Billboard Contemporary Jazz Albums	17
1986	Billboard Traditional Jazz Albums	9
1986	Billboard Top Soul Albums	30
1986	Billboard 200	81
1986	Australia	65
