= Breakin' Away (album) =

Studio album by Al Jarreau
- Released: August 3, 1981
- Recorded: 1981
- Studios: Dawnbreaker Studios (San Fernando); Garden Rake Studios (Studio City); Pasha Music (Hollywood); Sunset Sound (Hollywood)
- Genres: Crossover jazz; R&B; funk
- Length: 41:07
- Label: Warner Bros.
- Producer: Jay Graydon

Al Jarreau chronology
This Time (1980)	Breakin' Away (1981)	Jarreau (1983)

Breakin' Away is an album by Al Jarreau, released on August 3, 1981, on Warner Bros. Records. To quote AllMusic, "Breakin' Away became the standard bearer of the L.A. pop and R&B sound."

The album was certified Platinum by the RIAA.

== Chart performance ==
Breakin' Away remains Al Jarreau's most popular album. It spent two years on the Billboard 200 and peaked at #9. The album also hit #1 on both the Jazz and R&B charts.

Four single releases made the charts: "We're in This Love Together", "Breakin' Away", "Teach Me Tonight", and "Roof Garden", the latter being only released in The Netherlands, Belgium and France.

At the Grammy Awards in 1982 the album was given the prize for Best Pop Vocal Performance, Male, while "(Round, Round, Round) Blue Rondo à la Turk" received the award for Best Jazz Vocal Performance, Male. The album was also nominated for Album of the Year.

== Track listing ==
All tracks are written by Al Jarreau, Jay Graydon, and Tom Canning, except where noted.

Side one
No.	Title	Writer(s)	Length
1.	"Closer to Your Love"		3:54
2.	"My Old Friend"	Richard Page; Steve George; John Lang	4:26
3.	"We're in This Love Together"	Roger Murrah; Keith Stegall	3:44
4.	"Easy"		5:23
5.	"Our Love"		3:53

Side two
No.	Title	Writer(s)	Length
6.	"Breakin' Away"		4:12
7.	"Roof Garden"		6:19
8.	"(Round, Round, Round) Blue Rondo à la Turk"	Dave Brubeck, lyrics by Al Jarreau	4:44
9.	"Teach Me Tonight"	Sammy Cahn; Gene De Paul	4:13
Total length:			41:07

== Personnel ==
=== Musicians ===
- Al Jarreau – lead vocals, backing vocals (1, 3–7, 9), rhythm arrangements (1–7, 9), vocal arrangements (8)
- Jay Graydon – guitars (1–7, 9), synthesizer programming (1, 2), rhythm arrangements (1–7, 9), vocal arrangements (8)
- Tom Canning – piano (1), Fender Rhodes (1, 4, 9), synthesizers (1–4, 8), rhythm arrangements (1–7, 9), vocal arrangements (8)
- David Foster – piano (2, 5, 6), Fender Rhodes (2, 5, 6), synthesizers (2, 5, 6), string arrangements (5)
- Michael Omartian – Fender Rhodes (3), synthesizers (3)
- Michael Boddicker – synthesizer programming (2, 8), synthesizers (3–6, 8)
- J. Peter Robinson – synthesizers (4)
- Larry Williams – synthesizer solo (4)
- George Duke – Fender Rhodes (7)
- Milcho Leviev – piano (8), rhythm arrangements (8)
- Steve Lukather – guitar (2, 3)
- Dean Parks – guitar (9)
- Abraham Laboriel – bass (1–5, 7–9)
- Neil Stubenhaus – bass (6)
- Steve Gadd – drums (1–5, 7–9)
- Jeff Porcaro – drums (6)
- Bob Zimmitti – percussion (4)
- Tom Scott – saxophone (1)
- Lon Price – alto saxophone solo (3, 9)
- Bill Reichenbach Jr. – trombone (6, 7)
- Jerry Hey – flugelhorn (2), trumpet (6, 7), horn arrangements (6, 7)
- Chuck Findley – trumpet (6, 7)
- Richard Page – backing vocals (2, 5, 7)
- Steve George – backing vocals (2, 5, 7)
- Bill Champlin – backing vocals (7)
- Billy Byers – string arrangements (9)

=== Technical ===
- Produced by Jay Graydon
- Associate producer – Tom Canning
- Engineered by Jay Graydon, Joe Bogan (1–5, 7–9), and Larry Brown (6)
- Second engineers – Debbie Thompson (1–5, 7–9); Mikey Davis and Csaba Petocz (6)
- Strings recorded by Humberto Gatica (5, 9) at Sunset Sound (Hollywood, CA)
- Mastered by Bernie Grundman at A&M Studios (Hollywood, CA)
- Musician contractor – Frank DeCaro
- Art direction and design – Christine Sauers
- Cover photography – Susan Jarreau
- Management – Patrick Rains & Associates

== Charts ==
=== Weekly charts ===
Chart performance for Breakin' Away
Chart (1982–83)	Peak position
Australian Albums (Kent Music Report)	80
Dutch Albums (Album Top 100)	3
Finnish Albums (Suomen virallinen lista)	7
New Zealand Albums (RMNZ)	36
Norwegian Albums (VG-lista)	9
US Billboard 200	9
US Top Jazz Albums (Billboard)	23
US Top R&B/Hip-Hop Albums (Billboard)	1

=== Year-end charts ===
Year End Chart (1982)	Peak position
U.S. Billboard 200	21
R&B	13
Jazz	1

=== Certifications ===
Country	Certifications
France	Gold
USA	Platinum
