= All I Got (album) =

Studio album by Al Jarreau
- Released: September 17, 2002
- Studios: Capitol Studios and Sunset Sound (Hollywood, California); Schnee Studios (North Hollywood, California); Dubie Grooves (Santa Monica, California); Funky Joint Studios (Sherman Oaks, California); Brandon's Way Recording (Los Angeles, California)
- Genres: Vocal jazz; R&B
- Length: 50:37
- Label: GRP
- Producers: Paul Brown; Steve Dubin

Al Jarreau chronology
Tomorrow Today (2000)	All I Got (2002)	Accentuate the Positive (2004)

Professional ratings
Review scores
Source	Rating
AllMusic	4/5 stars
Los Angeles Times	3/5 stars

All I Got is a studio album by Al Jarreau, issued in 2002 by GRP Records. The album rose to No. 4 on the Billboard Jazz Albums chart.

== Singles ==
"Secrets of Love" (released August 13, 2002) reached No. 21 on the Billboard Adult R&B Songs chart.

== Track listing ==
No.	Title	Writer(s)	Producer(s)	Length
1.	"Random Act of Love"	Steven Dubin; Siedah Garrett; Nelson Jackson	Steven Dubin	4:43
2.	"Life Is"	Paul Brown; Jarreau; David "Kahlid" Woods	David "Kahlid" Woods; Paul Brown	4:00
3.	"Never Too Late"	Brown; Jarreau; John Stoddart	Brown	4:04
4.	"Feels Like Heaven"	Dubin; Garrett; Manuel Seal	Dubin; Brown	4:38
5.	"Lost and Found" (featuring Joe Cocker)	Tom Canning; Jarreau	Brown	4:52
6.	"Secrets of Love"	Rex Rideout; Milton Davis	Brown; Rex Rideout (co.)	4:37
7.	"All I Got"	Jarreau; Chris Walker; Ross Bolton; Freddie Ravel; Arno Lucas; Jose Morelli; Joe Turano	Brown; Jerry Hey (co.)	5:30
8.	"Until You Love Me"	Rideout	Brown; Rideout (co.)	4:40
9.	"Oasis"	Ricky Peterson; Jarreau	Brown	6:19
10.	"Jacaranda Bougainvillea"	Jarreau; Walker; Bolton; Ravel; Lucas; Morelli; Turano	Brown; Hey (co.)	4:46
11.	"Route 66"	Bobby Troup	Brown	2:33

== Personnel ==
Musicians and vocals

- Al Jarreau – vocals
- Nelson Jackson – keyboards (1)
- Robbie Nevil – additional keyboards (1, 4), hot licks (4)
- David "Kahlid" Woods – programming (2), backing vocals (2)
- Randy Kerber – keyboards (3)
- David Torkanowsky – keyboards (3)
- Larry Williams – keyboards (3), additional keyboards (9), flute (9), saxophones (10)
- Paul Brown – programming (3, 5–10)
- Jeff Lorber – keyboards (4)
- Manuel Seal – keyboards (4)
- Ricky Peterson – keyboards (5, 9)
- Tom Canning – additional keyboards (5)
- Rex Rideout – keyboards (6, 8), programming (6), drum programming (8)
- Dragan "D.C." Capor – programming (6, 7, 10, 11), additional programming (8)
- Freddie Ravel – keyboards (7, 10)
- Joe Turano – keyboards (7, 10), saxophones (7, 10), backing vocals (7, 10)
- Darrell Crooks – guitars (1)
- Paul Jackson Jr. – guitars (2, 3)
- Tony Maiden – guitars (5, 9)
- Ross Bolton – guitars (7, 10)
- Larry Kimpell – additional bass (1) , bass (5, 9)
- Roberto Vally – bass (3)
- Chris Walker – bass (7, 10), backing vocals (7, 9, 10)
- Steven Dubin – drums (1, 4), programming (4)
- Michael White – drums (3)
- Teddy Campbell – drums (5, 9)
- Jose "Jota" Morelli – drums (7, 10)
- Paulinho da Costa – percussion (2, 3, 5, 6, 9)
- Arno Lucas – percussion (7, 10), backing vocals (7, 10)
- Dan Higgins – saxophones (2, 5, 7)
- Kirk Whalum – saxophone (9)
- Bill Reichenbach Jr. – trombone (2, 5, 7)
- Jerry Hey – trumpet (2, 5, 7, 10)
- Siedah Garrett – backing vocals (1)
- Kurt Lykes – backing vocals (2)
- Trina Broussard – backing vocals (3)
- John Stoddart – backing vocals (3)
- Sherree Ford – backing vocals (4)
- Joe Cocker – vocals (5)
- Bridgette Bryant-Fiddmont – backing vocals (5)
- Wendy Moten – backing vocals (5)
- Caleb Simms – backing vocals (6, 8)
- Ryan Jarreau – backing vocals (7)
- Susan Jarreau – backing vocals (7)

Orchestra

- Jon Clarke – oboe (8)
- Nathan Campbell, Rick Todd and Brad Warnaar – French horn (8, 10)
- Bruce Dukov – concertmaster (8, 10)
- Charlie Bisharat, Denyse Buffum, Eve Butler, Darius Campo, Susan Chatman, Larry Corbett, Matt Funes, Berj Garabedian, Suzie Katayama, Peter Kent, Michelle Richards, Steve Richards, Mark Robertson, Haim Shtrum, Dan Smith, David Stenske, Evan Wilson, John Wittenberg and Margaret Wooten – strings (8, 10)

Music arrangements

- Steven Dubin – arrangements (1, 4)
- Paul Brown – arrangements (2, 3, 5, 9, 10)
- David "Kahlid" Woods – arrangements (2)
- Jerry Hey – arrangements (3, 10), horn arrangements (5, 7), additional arrangements (9), string arrangements (10)
- Sherree Ford – vocal arrangements (4)
- Rex Rideout – arrangements (6, 8)
- Ross Bolton – arrangements (7, 10)
- Al Jarreau – arrangements (7, 10, 11)
- Arno Lucas – arrangements (7, 10)
- Jose "Jota" Morelli – arrangements (7, 10)
- Freddie Ravel – arrangements (7, 10)
- Chris Walker – arrangements (7, 10)
- Bill Meyers – orchestra arrangements (8)
- Ricky Peterson – arrangements (9)

Production and technical

- Bill Darlington – executive producer, management
- Paul Brown – engineer, mixing (11)
- Steven Dubin – engineer
- Dave Rideau – engineer
- Al Schmitt – engineer
- Tommy Vicari – engineer
- Erik Zobler – engineer
- Jan Fairchild – mixing (1–10)
- Ryan Castle – assistant engineer
- Kevin Dean – assistant engineer
- Steve Genewick – assistant engineer
- Ryan Petrie – assistant engineer
- Dragan "D.C." Capor – Pro Tools
- Stewart Whitmore – digital editing
- Stephen Marcussen – mastering
- Marcussen Mastering (Hollywood, California) – editing and mastering location
- Lexy Shroyer – production coordinator
- Hollis King – art direction
- Isabelle Wong – design
- Rocky Schenck – photography
