= Hymns in the Garden =

Studio album by Kirk Whalum
- Released: September 11, 2001
- Studio: Dark Horse Recording (Franklin, Tennessee); O'Henry Sound Studios (Burbank, California)
- Genre: Jazz
- Length: 1:03:02
- Label: Warner Bros.
- Producer: Kirk Whalum; John Stoddart

Kirk Whalum chronology
Unconditional (2000)	Hymns in the Garden (2001)	The Christmas Message (2001)

Professional ratings
Review scores
Source	Rating
AllMusic	3/5 stars

Hymns in the Garden is an album by saxophonist Kirk Whalum issued in 2001 on Warner Bros. Records. The album reached No. 18 on the Billboard Top Contemporary Jazz Albums chart and No. 27 on the Billboard Top Jazz Albums chart. The album was nominated for Best Pop Instrumental Album at the 43rd Annual Grammy Awards in 2001.

== Critical reception ==
AllMusic's Jason Birchmeier declared "Don't expect too many surprises from Kirk Whalum's Hymns in the Garden if you're familiar with his previous few gospel-tinged albums like Unconditional and The Gospel According to Jazz. Like those two albums, Whalum goes out of his way to invest a considerable amount of spiritual sentiment into his candy-coated crossover jazz."

== Track listing ==
No.	Title	Writer(s)	Length
1.	"I Will Trust in the Lord"	Traditional	4:27
2.	"Jesus Paid It All"		4:18
3.	"Christ Is All"	William A. Williams	4:47
4.	"Precious Lord Take My Hand"		5:00
5.	"Just a Closer Walk with Thee"		3:36
6.	"My Faith Looks Up to Thee"	Ray Palmer	5:19
7.	"Jesus Is All the World to Me"	Will Lamartine Thompson	5:56
8.	"Fairest Lord Jesus"		5:14
9.	"Softly and Tenderly"		4:46
10.	"I Must Tell Jesus"	Elisha Hoffman	6:15
11.	"He's Sweet I Know/He Knows How Much You Can Bear"	Traditional/Roberta Martin	4:00
12.	"I Want Jesus to Walk with Me"	Traditional	5:27
13.	"In the Garden"		3:47

== Personnel ==
- Kirk Whalum – alto saxophone, soprano saxophone, tenor saxophone, programming
- John Stoddart – acoustic piano, keyboards, programming
- Marc Harris – organ
- Doc Powell – guitars
- Michael Manson – bass
- Sean McCurley – drums
- Lalo Davila – percussion
- Jerry Peters – string arrangements

=== Production ===
- Earl Cole Jr. – executive producer, production coordinator, management
- Kirk Whalum – executive producer, producer
- John Stoddart – producer
- Gary Paczosa – recording, mixing
- James Bauer – assistant engineer
- Tim Lauber – assistant engineer
- Tim O'Dell – assistant engineer
- Gerry Brown – additional engineer
- Randy LeRoy – mastering at Final Stage Mastering (Nashville, Tennessee)
- Mark Larson – art direction, design
- Sharon Collins – design concept
- Barron Claiborne – photography
- Richard Lee – photography
