= Tomorrow Today =

Studio album by Al Jarreau
- Released: March 7, 2000
- Studio: Funky Joint Studios, Bill Champlin Studio and Heintz 57 Varieties Studio (Sherman Oaks, California); Bill Schnee Studios (North Hollywood, California); Alpha Studios and The Enterprise (Burbank, California); WallyWorld Studios (Marin County, California); Sound On Sound and Chung King Studios (New York City, New York); East Bay Recording (Tarrytown, New York)
- Genre: Vocal jazz; R&B
- Length: 49:28
- Label: GRP
- Producer: Paul Brown; Barry J. Eastmond

Al Jarreau chronology
Tenderness (1994)	Tomorrow Today (2000)	All I Got (2002)

Professional ratings
Review scores
Source	Rating
AllMusic	3/5 stars

Tomorrow Today is a studio album by Al Jarreau issued in 2000 by GRP Records. The album rose to No. 2 on the Billboard Jazz Albums chart.

== Overview ==
Artists such as Boney James and Vanessa Williams are featured.

Jarreau covered The Crusaders Puddit (Put It Where You Want It) upon the album.

== Singles ==
"It's How You Say It" rose to No. 14 on the Billboard Adult R&B Songs chart.

== Track listing ==
All songs produced by Paul Brown, except where noted.

No.	Title	Writer(s)	Producer(s)	Length
1.	"Just to Be Loved"	Bill Champlin; Greg Mathieson		4:18
2.	"Let Me Love You"	John Stoddart; Paul Brown		4:41
3.	"In My Music"	David "Kahlid" Woods; Paul Brown	Paul Brown; David "Kahlid" Woods (co.)	4:05
4.	"Through It All"	Steve Harvey; Gary Brown		4:30
5.	"Tomorrow Today"	Freddie Ravel; Al Jarreau	Paul Brown; Freddie Ravel (co.); Al Jarreau (co.)	4:41
6.	"Flame"	Al Jarreau; Larry Williams; Andrew Ford		5:31
7.	"Something That You Said"	Josef Zawinul; Al Jarreau		5:57
8.	"Last Night"	Andrea Martin; Steve Dubin	Paul Brown; Steven Dubin (co.)	3:48
9.	"God's Gift to the World" (Duet With Vanessa Williams)	Mike Himelstein; Terry Sampson		4:28
10.	"It's How You Say It"	Barry J. Eastmond; Al Jarreau	Barry J. Eastmond	4:45
11.	"Puddit (Put It Where You Want)"	Joe Sample; Al Jarreau		2:44

== Personnel ==
Musicians and vocalists
- Al Jarreau – vocals, backing vocals (10)
- Greg Mathieson – keyboards (1)
- Phil Davis – keyboards (1, 2, 8), drum programming (2, 8)
- Larry Williams – keyboards (1, 6, 7, 9), additional keyboards (4), additional strings (4), saxophones (5, 6), programming (7)
- Jerry Hey – Moog synthesizer (1), strings (1), additional keyboards (4), additional strings (4), trumpet (5, 6)
- John Stoddart – keyboards (2), backing vocals (2)
- David "Kahlid" Woods – keyboards (3), drum programming (3), backing vocals (3)
- Dan Shea – keyboards (4), drum programming (4)
- Tim Heintz – additional keyboards (4), additional strings (4), keyboards (8, 9)
- Freddie Ravel – keyboards (5)
- Randy Kerber – keyboards (9)
- Barry J. Eastmond – keyboards (10), drum programming (10)
- Paul Jackson Jr. – guitars (1, 2, 6)
- Tony Maiden – guitars (3)
- Ross Bolton – guitars (4)
- Michael Landau – guitars (9)
- Phil Hamilton – guitars (10)
- Alex Al – bass (3)
- Chris Walker – bass (5, 6)
- Jimmy Johnson – bass (7)
- Paul Brown – drum programming (1, 9)
- Steve Gadd – drums (5–7)
- Paulinho da Costa – percussion (4)
- Luis Conte – percussion (5, 6)
- Tollak Ollestad – harmonica (1)
- Boney James – saxophone (2), EWI (6)
- Bill Reichenbach Jr. – trombone (5, 6)
- Gary Grant – trumpet (5, 6)
- Rick Braun – trumpet (7)
- Bill Champlin – backing vocals (1)
- Sue Ann Carwell – backing vocals (4)
- Josie James – backing vocals (4)
- Donna Taylor – backing vocals (4)
- Phyllis Yvonne Williams – backing vocals (4)
- Andrea Martin – backing vocals (8)
- Vanessa Williams – vocals (9)

Choir on "God's Gift to the World"

- Bubba Atkins
- Sarah Brown
- Reggie Burrell
- Paizley Carwell
- Andrew Hey
- Ryan Jarreau
- Susan Jarreau
- Kevyn Lettau
- Angela Muñoz
- Mathew Nevarez
- Monea Spencer
- Mindy Stein
- Karina Vela
- Alexis Weatherspoon
- Ericka Weatherspoon
- Lauren Weatherspoon

Music arrangements

- Paul Brown – arrangements (1, 2)
- Bill Champlin – BGV arrangements (1)
- Phil Davis – arrangements (1, 2, 8)
- Al Jarreau – arrangements (2, 4, 5, 10, 11)
- David "Kahlid" Woods – arrangements (3)
- Dan Shea – arrangements (4)
- Freddie Ravel – arrangements (5)
- Eric Jorgensen – additional orchestration (5)
- Jerry Hey – arrangements (6, 7, 9)
- Sue Ann Carwell – vocal arrangements (9)
- Barry J. Eastmond – arrangements (10)

== Production ==
- Bill Darlington – executive producer
- Paul Brown – producer (1–9, 11)
- David "Kahlid" Woods – co-producer (3)
- Al Jarreau – co-producer (5)
- Freddie Ravel – co-producer (5)
- Steve Dubin – co-producer (8)
- Barry J. Eastmond – producer (10)
- Lexy Shroyer – production coordinator (1–9, 11)
- Maria Eastmond – production coordination (10)
- Camille Tominaro – production coordination for GRP
- Hollis King – art direction
- Albert Sanchez – photography

Technical credits

- Stephen Marcussen – mastering at A&M Mastering Studios (Hollywood, California)
- Andrew Garver – digital editing
- Martin Christenson – Pro Tools
- Tim Heintz – Pro Tools
- Bill Schnee – recording (1–9, 11), mixing (3, 4, 6, 9)
- Ray Bardani – mixing (1, 11)
- Dave Rideau – recording (2)
- Paul Brown – mixing (2, 5, 8)
- Al Schmitt – mixing (7)
- Barry J. Eastmond – recording (10)
- "Bassy" Bob Brockmann – mixing (10)
- Koji Egawa – assistant engineer (1–9, 11)
- John O'Mahony – assistant engineer (10)
