= Midnight Passion =

Midnight Passion may refer to:

- "Midnight Passion", the working title of "Moonlight Shadow", a song by British musician Mike Oldfield
- Midnight Passion, a 1991 album by Freddie Ravel
