= The Promise (Kirk Whalum album) =

Studio album by Kirk Whalum
- Released: 1989
- Studio: BearTracks Studios (Suffern, New York); Remidi Studio (Ardsley-On-The-Hudson, New York); Peace In The Valley Recording (South Pasadena, California)
- Genre: Soul, jazz
- Length: 50:38
- Label: Columbia
- Producer: Bob James; Jerry Peters (Tracks 1 & 3)

Kirk Whalum chronology
And You Know That (1988)	The Promise (1989)	Caché (1993)

The Promise is the third album by jazz artist Kirk Whalum, released in 1989 on Columbia Records. The album reached No. 7 on the Billboard Top Contemporary Jazz Albums chart.

== Overview ==
The Promise was produced by Bob James. Artists such as Syreeta and Paul Jackson Jr. appear on the album.

== Critical reception ==
Professional ratings
Review scores
Source	Rating
AllMusic	4/5 stars

With a four out of five star rating, Johnathan Widran of Allmusic said "But this third effort was his strongest outing to date, displaying a versatility which ranges from spiritual ("The Promise") to Brazilian (the tropical flavored "Desperately") to straight ahead rock & roll (the Larry Carlton tribute "LC's Back," which features the fancy licks of the guitarist himself)."

== Track listing ==
1. "I Receive Your Love" (Jerry Peters, Skip Scarborough) - 6:06
2. "N.E. Wind" (Kirk Whalum) - 5:06
3. "The Promise" (Jerry Peters)- 6:04
4. "Ma Foi" (Kirk Whalum) - 5:28
5. "L.C.'s Back" (Kirk Whalum) - 5:18
6. "Desperately" (Kirk Whalum) - 6:33
7. "Out-A-Hand" (Kirk Whalum) - 5:04
8. "Don't Even Look" (Kirk Whalum) - 5:08
9. "For All We Know" (J. Fred Coots, Sam Lewis) - 5:51

== Personnel ==
- Kirk Whalum – saxophones
- Jerry Peters – keyboards (1, 3), additional programming (1, 3)
- Diane Louie – synthesizer programming (1, 3), computer programming (1, 3)
- Max Risenhoover – synthesizer programming (1–8), additional computer programming (1–8)
- Bob James – keyboards (2, 4–9), synthesizer programming (2, 4–8), computer programming (2, 4–8)
- Paul Jackson Jr. – guitars (1, 3)
- Steve Khan – guitars (2, 4, 6–8), rhythm guitar (5), guitar solo (6)
- Larry Carlton – guitar (5)
- Dean Brown – guitar solo (7), additional guitars (8)
- Gary King – bass (2, 4–8), bass solo (6)
- Abraham Laboriel – bass (3)
- Schuyler Deale – bass (4)
- Ron Carter – bass (9)
- Herman Matthews – drums
- Leonard "Doc" Gibbs – percussion (2–8)
- Syreeta Wright – vocals (1)
- Dorian Holley – vocals (1)
- Darryl Phinnessee – vocals (1)

=== Production ===
- George Butler – executive producer
- Bob James – co-producer (1, 3), producer (2, 4–9)
- Jerry Peters – co-producer (1, 3)
- Hal Sacks – recording (1, 3)
- Joe Jorgensen – recording (2, 4–9), mixing, mastering supervisor
- Max Risenhoover – assistant engineer
- Doug Rose – assistant engineer
- Rik Pekkonen – additional engineer (5)
- Vlado Meller – mastering at CBS Studios (New York, NY)
- Marion Orr – album coordinator
- Joel Zimmerman – art direction
- Hans Neleman – photography
- David Carrington – stylist, make-up
- Peter Paul – management
