= Euge Groove discography =

The discography of the American jazz artist Euge Groove consists of eight studio albums and eleven promo singles. Listed are also several appearances in records where he appeared as a sideman, but not the re-issues, unless they are counted separately from the original works in the charts. The discography shows the peak weekly chart positions in the United States for jazz^{[a]} and heatseekers charts.^{[b]}

Euge Groove made his debut as professional musician in 1987 as sideman, collecting since the beginning good results on mainstream, such as Exposé's number-one hit single, "Seasons Change". His reputation went very quickly to high levels, arriving to collaborate with several music icons, like Joe Cocker, Elton John, Eros Ramazzotti and Richard Marx. In the late 1990s, he began a solo career and published his first solo studio album, Euge Groove (2000) for Warner Bros. Records. The album was a low seller but peaked at number 25 on the Top Contemporary Jazz Albums chart in Billboard magazine. The follow-up, Play Date (2002), peaked at number 10 on the same chart and introduced Groove to the contemporary jazz audience. After this result, Euge Groove left Warner Bros. for Narada Jazz and released Livin' Large (2004), which peaked at number four on the contemporary jazz chart. Just Feels Right was released in 2005, peaking at No. 3 and spawning Groove's first jazz hit, "Chillaxin" (2006), which reached number three on the Smooth Jazz Songs chart.

In 2007, Groove reached the commercial peak publishing Born 2 Groove. It reached number one on the Top Contemporary Jazz Albums chart and spawned four smooth jazz hits, including his first two number-one singles: "Born 2 Groove" and "Religify". After this success, Groove left Narada Jazz for Shanachie Entertainment, where he continued to release successful albums and promo singles for the contemporary jazz audience. Sunday Morning (2009) peaked at number two and contains two top ten hits, including the number-one hit from the same name. S7even Large (2011) peaked at number three and had one top ten hit. In 2012, Groove came back on the top of the albums chart with House of Groove, which spawned another number-one hit with the title track.

== Albums ==
=== Studio albums ===
List of studio albums, with selected chart positions
Title	Album details	Peak chart positions		
Title	Album details	US Jazz (Cont)	US Jazz	US Heat
Euge Groove	Release date: May 2, 2000; Label: Warner Bros.; Format: CD, Digital download	25	41	—
Play Date	Release date: July 2, 2002; Label: Warner Bros.; Format: CD, Digital download	10	13	—
Livin' Large	Release date: March 9, 2004; Label: Narada Jazz; Format: CD, Digital download	4	7	—
Just Feels Right	Release date: August 30, 2005; Label: Narada Jazz; Format: CD, Digital download	3	4	20
Born 2 Groove	Release date: June 19, 2007; Label: Narada Jazz; Format: CD, Digital download	1	4	10
Sunday Morning	Release date: October 27, 2009; Label: Shanachie; Format: CD, Digital download	2	10	31
S7ven Large	Release date: May 17, 2011; Label: Shanachie; Format: CD, Digital download	3	4	13
House of Groove	Release date: September 25, 2012; Label: Shanachie; Format: CD, Digital download	1	2	9
Got 2 Be Groovin’	Release date: August 19, 2014; Label: Shanachie; Format: CD, DD, Vinyl	2	4	
Still Euge	Release date: July 22, 2016; Label: Shanachie; Format: CD, DD	1	1	
Groove On!	Release date: Nov. 17, 2017; Label: Shanachie; Format: CD, DD	2	4	
Sing My Song	Release date: April 23, 2020; Label: Shanachie; Format: CD, DD	5		
Comfort Zone	Release date: August 25, 2023; Label: Shanachie Ent. Corp.; Format: CD, Digital download			
"—" denotes a recording that did not chart or was not released in that territory.

== Singles ==
=== As lead artist ===
List of singles released as lead artist, with selected chart positions
Title	Year	Peak chart positions	Album
Title	Year	US Jazz (Smooth)	Album
"Get Em Goin'"	2005	1	Just Feels Right
"Chillaxin"	2006	3	Just Feels Right
"Born 2 Groove"	2007	1	Born 2 Groove
"Mr. Groove"	2008	2	Born 2 Groove
"Religify"	2008	1	Born 2 Groove
"Slow Jam"	2009	15	Born 2 Groove
"Sunday Morning"	2009	1	Sunday Morning
"All for You"	2010	3	Sunday Morning
"S7ven Large"	2011	4	S7ven Large
"The Funky Bunch"	2011	12	S7ven Large
"House of Groove"	2012	1	House of Groove
"Old.Edu (Old School)"	2012	1	House of Groove
"Still Euge"	2017	1	Still Euge
"Groove On!"	2018	1	Groove On!
"Dirty Dozen"	2020	1	Sing My Song

=== As featured artist ===
List of promo singles released as featured artist, with selected chart positions
Title	Year	Peak chart positions	Album
Title	Year	US Jazz (Smooth)	Album
"Lay It On Me" (with Brian Simpson)	2010	28	South Beach
"I Don't Mind" (with Adam Hawley)	2017	1	Just the Beginning

== Other appearances ==
=== As sideman ===
List of albums, where Groove appears as sideman
Album	Year	Artist	Notes
Exposure	1987	Exposé	Saxophone
Small World	1988	Huey Lewis and the News	Sax (tenor)
Captain Swing	1989	Michelle Shocked	Sax (tenor)
That We Do Know	1989	Uncle Festive	Sax (alto), sax (soprano), sax (tenor)
Brigade	1990	Heart	Sax (tenor)
The Simpsons Sing the Blues	1990	The Simpsons	Sax (tenor)
Spellbound	1991	Paula Abdul	Sax (tenor)
Shadows of Urbano	1991	Michael Colina	Sax (tenor)
Power of Suggestion	1991	Richard Elliot	Assistant producer, drum programming, keyboards
Rush Street	1991	Richard Marx	Saxophone
Warm Your Heart	1991	Aaron Neville	Sax (alto)
The Steve Pryor Band	1991	The Steve Pryor Band	Sax (tenor)
Luck of the Draw	1991	Bonnie Raitt	Sax (tenor)
Monster on a Leash	1991	Tower of Power	Sax (alto), sax (tenor)
Duets	1993	Elton John	Horn
MMC	1993	MMC	
Working Class	1994	Pete Anderson	Sax (tenor)
Paid Vacation	1994	Richard Marx	Horn
Driving Beverly Hills	1994	Mark Portmann	
Mysterious	1995	David Royal	Saxophone
Flesh and Bone	1997	Richard Marx	Horn
Eros Live	1998	Eros Ramazzotti	Keyboards, saxophone
Kisses in the Rain	2001	Rick Braun	Sax (tenor)
Glow	2001	Peter White	Saxophone
Right Here, Right Now	2003	David Benoit	Guest artist, sax (tenor)
Full Circle	2006	David Benoit	Guest artist, main personnel, saxophone

- For every year (here reported chronologically) the albums are listed alphabetically by the last name of the artist.

== Notes ==
- a Jazz Albums contains traditional and contemporary jazz albums and unlike of Top Traditional Jazz Albums and Top Contemporary Jazz Albums, it is available only on billboard.com and billboard.biz
- b Top Heatseekers Albums contains only albums of artists that never entered in the top 100 of the Billboard 200 or in top 10 of the Top R&B/Hip-Hop Albums, Top Country Albums, Top Latin Albums, Top Christian Albums or Top Gospel Albums. There is a similar chart also for the songs, called Top Heatseekers Songs and lists songs of artists that never entered in the top 50 of the Billboard Hot 100 (or the top 50 of the Hot 100 Airplay prior to December 5, 1998).
