= Songs of the Season (Peter White album) =

Studio album by Peter White
- Released: September 30, 1997
- Studios: Funky Joint Studios (Sherman Oaks, California); O'Henry Sound Studios and Alpha Studios (Burbank, California); Sunset Sound Recorders (Hollywood, California); Nightowl Studios (Los Angeles, California)
- Genres: Christmas music; Jazz; Smooth Jazz
- Length: 41:53
- Label: Columbia
- Producer: Paul Brown

Peter White chronology
Caravan of Dreams (1996)	Songs of the Season (1997)	Perfect Moment (1998)

Professional ratings
Review scores
Source	Rating
AllMusic	4/5 stars

Song of the Season is a studio album by guitarist Peter White, released in 1997 by Columbia Records. The album reached No. 13 on the Billboard Top Jazz Albums chart.

== Overview ==
Kenny Lattimore and Dee Harvey performed backing vocals on "River" and "Silent Night" respectively.

== Critical reception ==
Wanda Van Horn of Allmusic noted, "This collection of Christmas music done contemporary jazz/fusion style offers traditional hits ("The First Noel," "O Tannenbaum," "White Christmas," "Jingle Bells") to provide the perfect background music for holiday parties."

== Track listing ==
No.	Title	Writer(s)	Length
1.	"The Christmas Song"	M. Torme, R. Wells	4:31
2.	"Joy To The World/Hark The Herald Angels Sing"	Traditional	3:16
3.	"Greensleeves (What Child Is This?)"	Traditional	4:28
4.	"River"	J. Mitchell	4:56
5.	"The First Noel"	Traditional	4:16
6.	"O Tannenbaum"	Traditional	4:24
7.	"O Little Town Of Bethlehem"	Traditional	2:05
8.	"Jingle Bells"	Traditional	5:38
9.	"Silent Night"	Traditional	4:26
10.	"White Christmas"	I. Berlin	3:53

== Personnel ==
- Peter White – guitars, arrangements (2, 3, 5–9)
- Gregg Karukas – keyboards (1, 4), programming (1, 4), synth solo (1), arrangements (1, 4), acoustic piano (8)
- Paul Brown – arrangements (1–4, 6, 8), programming (3, 6, 9)
- Dave Torkanowsky – keyboards (3)
- Freddie Ravel – acoustic piano (9), electric piano (9), synthesizers (9), Moog bass (9), arrangements (9)
- Larry Kimpel – bass (3, 6)
- Brian Bromberg – bass (8)
- Peter Erskine – drums (8)
- Lenny Castro – percussion (1, 3, 6, 9)
- Kirk Whalum – tenor saxophone (3)
- Jerry Folsom – French horn solo (5)
- Rick Braun – flugelhorn (6)
- Dave Camp – flute (7)
- Jerry Hey – orchestration and conductor (2, 5)
- Bill Brown – orchestration and conductor (10)
- Ralph Morrison – concertmaster (2, 5, 10), violin solo (10)
- Kenny Lattimore – vocals (4)
- Dee Harvey – vocals (9)

=== Production ===
- Paul Brown – producer, mixing, recording (1–7, 9, 10)
- Dave Rideau – recording (8)
- Danny Vicari – orchestra recording (2, 5, 10)
- Brett Swain – orchestra recording assistant (2, 5, 10)
- Charles Nasser – assistant mix engineer
- Lee Herschberg – digital editing
- Tim Timmermans – additional editing
- Stephen Marcussen – mastering at Precision Mastering (Hollywood, California)
- Lexy Shroyer – project coordinator
- Christine Wilson – design, photo imaging
- Lori Stoll – photography
- Steve Chapman – management
