= All I Got =

All I Got may refer to:

- All I Got (album), a 2002 album by Al Jarreau
- All I Got, a 2001 album by Tomcraft
- "All I Got", song by Newton Faulkner from the album Hand Built by Robots (2007)
- "All I Got", song by K. Michelle from the album More Issues Than Vogue (2016)
- "All I Got", song by Chantal Kreviazuk from the album Hard Sail (2016)
- "All I Got", song by Rod Wave from the album SoulFly (2021)

== See also ==
- "She's All I Got", a 1971 song
