= For You (Kirk Whalum album) =

Studio album by Kirk Whalum
- Released: October 27, 1998
- Studio: Reel Thing Studio (Nashville, Tennessee); Sunset Sound (Hollywood, California); Alpha International Studios (Philadelphia, Pennsylvania)
- Genre: Jazz
- Length: 46:46
- Label: Warner Bros.
- Producer: Paul Brown

Kirk Whalum chronology
Colors (1997)	For You (1998)	Unconditional (2000)

For You is a studio album by jazz musician Kirk Whalum, released in 1998 by Warner Bros. Records. The album reached No. 4 on the Billboard Top Contemporary Jazz Albums chart and No. 6 on the Billboard Top Jazz Albums chart.

== Overview ==
For You was produced by Matt Pierson and Paul Brown. Artists such as Peter White appear on the album.

== Track listing ==
1	"Anytime"	Brandon Barnes, Brian McKnight	05:18
2	"Ascension"	Itaal Shur	05:14
3	"Same Ole Love"	Marilyn McLeod, Darryl K. Roberts	04:23
4	"My All"	Walter Afanasieff, Mariah Carey	03:58
5	"That's the Way Love Goes"	Charles Bobbit, J. Brown, Lefty Frizzell, Janet Jackson, Jimmy Jam and Terry Lewis, Whitey Shafer, Fred Wesley	04:40
6	"For You"	Kenny Lerum	04:11
7	"All I Do"	Morris Broadnax, Clarence Paul, Stevie Wonder	05:00
8	"Lover for Life"	Sam Dees	04:40
9	"I Want You"	Arthur Ross, Leon Ware	04:26
10	"Going in Circles"	Jerry Peters	04:56

== Personnel ==
- Kirk Whalum – tenor saxophone
- Tim Heintz – keyboards (1, 3, 5, 7, 10), bass (10)
- Gregg Karukas – Rhodes electric piano (1, 3, 5), keyboards (4, 6, 8), drums (4, 6)
- Ricky Peterson – Rhodes electric piano (2, 7, 8)
- David "Khalid" Woods – keyboards (2, 9), drum programming (2), arrangements (2, 9), drums (9)
- Paul Brown – programming (3, 10), arrangements (5, 7)
- Jerry Peters – Moog synthesizer (10), string arrangements (10)
- Tony Maiden – guitars (1, 3, 5)
- Paul Jackson Jr. – guitars (2, 6–8, 10)
- Peter White – Spanish guitar (4)
- Alex Al – Fender bass (1–3, 5, 7, 8)
- Lil' John Roberts – drums (1, 3, 5)
- Ricky Lawson – drums (7, 8, 10)
- Paulinho da Costa – percussion (1–3, 5, 7, 8, 10)
- Andy Weiner – arrangements (8)
- Bridgette Bryant-Fiddmont – vocals (2), backing vocals (7)
- Lynne Fiddmont-Linsey – vocals (2), backing vocals (7)
- Kevin Whalum – vocals (2, 9), backing vocals (7)
- Wendy Moten – lead vocals (7)

=== Production ===
- Matt Pierson – executive producer
- Paul Brown – producer, engineer, mixing (1, 2, 4–6, 9, 10)
- Don Murray – engineer, mixing (3, 8)
- David Rideau – mixing (7)
- Dan Steinberg – second engineer
- Josh Turner – second engineer
- Doug Sax – mastering at The Mastering Lab (Hollywood, California)
- Lexy Shroyer – production coordinator
- Mark Larson – art direction
- Barron Claiborne – photography
- Tara Posey – make-up
- Lorita Shields – wardrobe
- Earl Cole – management
