= The Christmas Message =

Studio album by Kirk Whalum
- Released: October 23, 2001
- Studio: Dark Horse Recording (Franklin, Tennessee); Father's Image (Brentwood, Tennessee); Yo Soy (Bellevue, Tennessee)
- Genre: Jazz
- Length: 1:04:43
- Label: Warner Bros.
- Producer: Kirk Whalum; John Stoddart

Kirk Whalum chronology
Hymns in the Garden (2001)	The Christmas Message (2001)	The Gospel According to Jazz Chapter 2 (2002)

Professional ratings
Review scores
Source	Rating
AllMusic	4/5 stars

The Christmas Message is an album by saxophonist Kirk Whalum issued in 2001 on Warner Bros. Records. The album reached No. 14 on the Billboard Top Contemporary Jazz Albums chart and No. 27 on the Billboard Top Jazz Albums chart. The album was nominated for Best Pop Instrumental Album at the 45th Annual Grammy Awards in 2003.

== Critical reception ==
Paula Edelstein of AllMusic wrote "This holiday collection is commensurate with Whalum's previous inspirational and spirited instrumental offering, Hymns in the Garden, in that it offers a wonderful visitation to classic songs with a very different approach and touch."

== Track listing ==
No.	Title	Writer(s)	Length
1.	"The First Noël"		5:47
2.	"Do You Hear What I Hear?"		4:48
3.	"Love from a Star"	John Stoddart	5:06
4.	"Cradle in Bethlehem"	Alfred Bryan, Larry Stock	5:27
5.	"O Holy Night"		6:25
6.	"The Little (Ghetto) Drummer Boy"		3:21
7.	"Rise Up Shepherd and Follow"		2:04
8.	"Sweet Little Jesus Boy"		3:02
9.	"Amazing Grace"		5:00
10.	"We Three Kings"		5:07
11.	"The Christmas Message"	Kirk Whalum	3:49
12.	"O Little Town of Bethlehem"		4:38
13.	"Hark! The Herald Angels Sing"		5:00
14.	"Blott En Dag"	Lina Sandell-Berg	4:51

== Personnel ==
- Kirk Whalum – soprano saxophone, tenor saxophone, synthesizer programming, computer programming
- John Stoddart – lead and backing vocals (1–5, 7–13), keyboards, acoustic piano, synthesizer programming, computer programming
- Michael Ripoll – acoustic guitars, electric guitars, nylon guitar
- Phil Keaggy – electric guitar (11), nylon-string acoustic guitar (11)
- David Santos – electric bass (1–5, 7–14)
- Kyle Whalum – electric bass (6), beatbox vocal (6)
- Sean McCurley – drums
- John Santos – percussion
- Kevin Whalum – lead and backing vocals (6)
- Cyndee Peters – backing vocals (7), lead vocals (14)

=== Production ===
- Kirk Whalum – producer, arrangements
- John Stoddart – producer, arrangements
- Ed Simonton – engineer, mixing (7, 8, 11, 13)
- Victor Caldwell – mixing (1–6, 9, 10, 12, 14), additional engineer, mastering
- Jared Byers – assistant engineer
- James Felver – assistant engineer
- Neal Garon – assistant engineer
- Kori Whalum – assistant engineer
- The Master's Lab (Brentwood, Tennessee) – mastering location
- Kimberly B. Eason – production coordinator
- Mark Larson – design, digital artwork
- Richard Lee – photography
