= Caché (album) =

Cache

Studio album by Kirk Whalum
- Released: 1993
- Studio: Ahhsum Lawson Studios (Walnut Creek, Virginia); Camel Island Studios and Mad Hatter Studios (Los Angeles, California); Capitol Studios and Ocean Way Recording (Hollywood, California); Pacifique Recording Studios and Schnee Studios (North Hollywood, California); The Enterprise (Burbank, California); Mad Dog Studios (Venice, California); Peace In The Valley (Arleta, California); Skyline Studios, Soundtrack Studios and Sound On Sound Recording, Inc. (New York City, New York)
- Genre: jazz
- Length: 54:17
- Label: Columbia
- Producer: Preston Glass; Robbie Buchanan; André Fischer; Jay Landers; Ricky Lawson; Jerry Peters; Hal Sacks; Philippe Saisse; Kirk Whalum

Kirk Whalum chronology
The Promise (1989)	Cache (1993)	In This Life (1995)

Professional ratings
Review scores
Source	Rating
AllMusic	2.5/5 stars

Caché is an album by saxophonist Kirk Whalum issued in 1993 on Columbia Records. The album reached No. 1 on the Billboard Top Contemporary Jazz Albums chart and No. 39 on the Billboard Top Jazz Albums chart.

== Overview ==
Artists such as Gerald Albright, Brenda Russell, Angela Bofill, Jevetta Steele and Nile Rodgers guest on the album.

== Covers ==
Whalum covered "Fragile" by Sting, Karyn White's "Love Saw It", "Over the Rainbow" by Judy Garland and Everything but the Girl's "The Language of Life".

== Track listing ==
No.	Title	Writer(s)	Length
1.	"X-Factor"	Philippe Saisse	6:58
2.	"Love is a Losing Game"	Kirk Whalum	4:29
3.	"Livin' in the Streets"	Kirk Whalum	5:15
4.	"Fragile"	Sting	5:32
5.	"Love Saw It"	Babyface, LA Reid, D. Simmons	5:44
6.	"Always a Part of Me"	Steven Birch, Preston Glass, D. Smith	5:12
7.	"Caché"	Phillipe Saisse	5:12
8.	"The Language of Life"	Tracey Thorn, Ben Watt	6:09
9.	"Fall in Love Again"	Kirk Whalum	5:47
10.	"Over The Rainbow"	Harold Arlen, E.Y. "Yip" Harburg	3:59

== Personnel ==
- Kirk Whalum – tenor saxophone (1, 3, 5, 7–10), soprano saxophone (2, 4, 6), Akai MPC-60 programming (3), backing vocals (5, 8)
- Philippe Saisse – keyboards (1, 7), programming (1, 7), arrangements (1, 7), backing vocals (7)
- Christian "Wicked" Wicht – additional programming (1, 7)
- Robbie Buchanan – keyboards (2), drum programming (2), arrangements (2)
- Brad Cole – keyboards (4), programming (4), arrangements (4)
- Greg Phillinganes – keyboards (5, 8), acoustic piano solo (8)
- Jerry Peters – additional keyboards (5, 8), organ (5, 8), string arrangements (5)
- Rob Mullins – keyboards (6)
- Preston Glass – additional keyboards (6), percussion (6), arrangements (6)
- Steve Birch – programming (6)
- Bob James – acoustic piano (7)
- Bill Cantos – keyboards (9), acoustic piano (9), Akai MPC-60 programming (9)
- Rick Jackson – acoustic piano (10)
- Dean Brown – lead guitar (1), electric guitar (7)
- Nile Rodgers – rhythm guitar (1)
- Paul Jackson, Jr. – guitars (3, 8)
- Ray Fuller – guitars (5)
- L. Carl Burnett – guitars (6)
- Carlos Rios – guitars (9)
- Marcus Miller – bass guitar (1)
- Freddie Washington – bass (3)
- Chris Walker – bass (5, 8)
- Wilton Felder – bass (6)
- Charles "Poogie" Bell – drums (1, 7)
- Ricky Lawson – drums (3, 5, 8, 9), drum programming (3, 9), Akai MPC-60 programming (3, 9), synth bass (9)
- Tyrone Griffen – Akai MPC-60 programming (3)
- David Willis – Akai MPC-60 programming (3, 9)
- Joe Wolfe – Akai MPC-60 programming (3), synthesizer programming (5, 8)
- Kenny MacDougald – drums (6)
- Brian Kilgore – percussion (5, 8)
- Andy Snitzer – alto saxophone (1, 7)
- Gary Bias – alto saxophone (5, 8)
- Gerald Albright – alto sax solo (5)
- Roger Rosenberg – baritone saxophone (1, 7)
- Ernie Fields Jr. – baritone saxophone (5, 8)
- Darryl Richards – tenor saxophone (5, 8)
- Michael Davis – trombone (1, 7)
- Maurice Spears – bass trombone (5, 8)
- Reggie Young – trombone (5, 8)
- Kent Smith – trumpet (1, 7)
- Ray Brown – trumpet (5, 8), horn contractor (5, 8)
- The Charles Veal Strings – strings (5)
- André Fischer – arrangements (4)
- Bill Murrell – music copyist (5)
- Vaneese Thomas – backing vocals (1)
- Lori Ann Velez – backing vocals (1, 7)
- James "D-Train" Williams – backing vocals (1, 7)
- Jevetta Steele – lead vocals (2), backing vocals (2)
- Jearlyn Steele-Battle – backing vocals (2)
- Olivia McClurken – backing vocals (3)
- Alfie Silas – backing vocals (3)
- Rose Stone – additional vocals (3), backing vocals (3)
- Brenda Russell – lead vocals (4), backing vocals (4)
- Julie Delgado – backing vocals (4)
- Lynne Fiddmont – backing vocals (5, 8)
- Kevin Guillaume – backing vocals (5, 8)
- Natalie Jackson – backing vocals (5, 8)
- Fred White – backing vocals (5, 8), vocal contractor (5, 8)
- Angela Bofill – lead vocals (6)
- Amy Keys – backing vocals (6)

== Production ==
- Philippe Saisse – producer (1, 7)
- Christian "Wicked" Wicht – assistant producer (1, 7)
- Robbie Buchanan – producer (2)
- Jay Landers – producer (2)
- Ricky Lawson – producer (3, 9)
- André Fischer – producer (4)
- Jerry Peters – producer (5, 8)
- Kirk Whalum – producer (5, 8–10)
- Preston Glass – producer (6)
- Hal Sacks – producer (9, 10)
- Bibi Green – production coordinator (1, 7)
- Joel Zimmerman – art direction, design
- Deborah Samuel – photography

Technical

- Eric Calvi – recording (1, 7), mixing (1, 7)
- Patrick McDougal – recording (2)
- Jeremy Smith – recording (2)
- Brian Malouf – mixing (2)
- Khaliq Glover – recording (3)
- Hal Sacks – recording (3, 5, 8–10), mixing (3, 5, 8–10)
- Jeffrey "Woody" Woodruff – recording (4)
- Don Tittle – recording (6), mixing (6)
- Malcolm Pollack – remixing (6)
- Vittorio Zammarano – additional engineer (1, 7)
- Brett Perry – additional engineer (2)
- Peter Beckerman – assistant engineer (1, 7)
- Chrystin Nevarez – assistant engineer (1, 7)
- John Siket – assistant engineer (1, 7)
- Darren Mora – assistant engineer (3), mix assistant (5, 8, 9)
- Robert Read – assistant engineer (3), mix assistant (5, 8, 9)
- Michael Annas Allaf – assistant engineer (4)
- Randy Long – assistant engineer (4)
- Noel Hazen – recording assistant (5, 8, 9)
- Charlie Paakkari – recording assistant (5, 8)
- Chris Rich – recording assistant (5, 8)
- Michael Dumas – recording assistant (6)
- Dwane Sexton – mix assistant (6)
