= Into My Soul =

Studio album by Kirk Whalum
- Released: July 22, 2003
- Studio: Memphis Records and #1 Beale Street (Memphis, Tennessee); Yo Soy (Bellevue, Tennessee); Paragon Studios (Franklin, Tennessee); Peace In The Valley Recording (Arleta, California); Blind Alley Studios and Chalice Recording Studios (Los Angeles, California)
- Genre: Jazz, smooth jazz
- Length: 54:01
- Label: Warner Music Group
- Producer: Kirk Whalum; David Porter

Kirk Whalum chronology
Groovin' (2002)	Into My Soul (2003)	Kirk Whalum Performs the Babyface Songbook (2005)

Into My Soul is a studio album by jazz saxophonist Kirk Whalum, released in 2003 by Warner Bros. Records. The album reached No. 10 on the Billboard Top Jazz Albums and No. 7 on the Billboard Top Contemporary Jazz Albums charts.

== Overview ==
Artists such as Isaac Hayes, Phil Perry and Maurice White appeared on the album. The album was recorded in the studio of and produced by Songwriters Hall of Fame inductee David Porter.

== Critical reception ==
Professional ratings
Review scores
Source	Rating
Philadelphia Daily News	(B−)
AllMusic	1.5/5 stars

Johnathan Takiff of the Philadelphia Daily News wrote in a B− review, "Smooth school saxophonist Kirk Whalum gets into a Memphis mood on "Into My Soul". Matt Collar of AllMusic remarked "On what is ostensibly his Memphis album, Whalum -- a Memphis native -- does evince a Stax-style soulfulness; unfortunately, he keeps the arrangements and his own playing so mild and light that nothing really ever sticks with you." Lucy Tauss of JazzTimes also praised the album saying "Memphis-born saxophonist Kirk Whalum explores his hometown’s rich musical heritage on Into My Soul (Warner Bros.)...Whalum has crafted a series of tracks that offer a personal and deeply felt take on the soul and spirit of Memphis music."

== Track listing ==
No.	Title	Writer(s)	Length
1.	"Do You Feel Me"	J. Blackfoot, Phil Perry	4:53
2.	"Into My Soul"	John Stoddart	4:57
3.	"Hold On I'm Coming"	Isaac Hayes	4:14
4.	"Another Beautiful Day"	John Stoddart	3:56
5.	"Hoddamile (Hot or Mild)"	David Porter, Garry Goin	4:34
6.	"I Loved You in Memphis"	Benita Hill, Isaac Hayes	4:53
7.	"That's All Right"	Arthur Crudup	4:01
8.	"Memphis Reason"	Kirk Whalum	5:06
9.	"Club Paradise"	David Porter, Garry Goin, Kirk Whalum	4:22
10.	"You Had Me at Hello"	Kirk Whalum	4:24
11.	"Me, Me & You"	David Porter, Garry Goin, Kirk Whalum	6:07
12.	"Postlude in B Major" (bonus track)		2:19

== Personnel ==
- Kirk Whalum – soprano saxophone, tenor saxophone, keyboards, additional programming
- John Stoddart – keyboards (1, 2, 4–12), keyboard solo (4, 8), backing vocals (6)
- Garry Goin – additional keyboards, additional programming, acoustic guitars (1–4, 6–12), electric guitars (1–4, 6–12)
- Lester Snell – keyboards (3), organ (3)
- Tyrone Dickerson – organ solo (11)
- Norman Brown – guitars (5)
- Greg Moore – additional guitars (6, 7)
- Michael Ripoll – additional guitars (6, 10, 12)
- Kyle Whalum – bass (12)
- Blair Cunningham – drums (1, 2, 4–11)
- Steve Potts – drums (3)
- Marcus Finnie – drums (12)
- Luis Conte – percussion
- Bill Hurd – soprano sax harmonies (1), baritone saxophone (3)
- Floyd Newman – baritone saxophone (3)
- Rod McGaha – trumpet (3)
- Rick Braun – trumpet (5)
- J. Blackfoot – vocals (1)
- Phil Perry – vocals (1)
- Issac Hayes – featured vocals (6)
- Wendy Moten – featured vocals (6)
- Kevin Whalum – vocals (7)
- Maurice White – featured vocals (10)
- Gregory Curtis – vocals (10)

=== Production ===
- Matt Pierson – executive producer
- David Porter – producer
- Kirk Whalum – producer
- Garry Goin – associate producer, additional tracking, additional engineer
- Hal Sacks – tracking engineer
- Dave Rideau – mix engineer
- Jared Bryans – additional engineer, Pro Tools technician
- David Hudzik – assistant engineer
- Steve Hall – mastering at Future Disc (Hollywood, California)
- Earl Cole – project coordinator, management
- Mark Larson – art direction
- Jim "Señor" McGuire – photography
