= Joined at the Hip =

Studio album by Kirk Whalum
- Released: 1996
- Studio: Carriage House Studios (Stamford, Connecticut); Remidi Studio (Ardsley-On-Hudson, New York); The Hit Factory, Right Track Recording and Battery Sound (New York City, New York)
- Genre: Soul, Jazz
- Length: 1:02:59
- Label: Warner Bros.
- Producer: Bob James

Kirk Whalum chronology
In This Life (1995)	Joined at the Hip (1996)	Colors (1997)

Joined at the Hip is a studio album by jazz musicians Kirk Whalum and Bob James, released in 1996 by Warner Bros. Records. The album reached No. 10 on the Billboard Top Contemporary Jazz Albums chart and No. 11 on the Billboard Top Jazz Albums chart.

Joined at the Hip was nominated for a Grammy in the category of Best Contemporary Jazz Performance.

== Critical reception ==
Professional ratings
Review scores
Source	Rating
AllMusic	4/5 stars

Johnathan Widran of AllMusic exclaimed "After many appearances on each other's solo efforts since the mid-80's, Whalum and James are now on equal terms, Joined at the Hip for a project more spontaneous and soulful than most of their recent output. Keeping that adventurous spontaneity going are the duo's inventive support band of guitarist Jeff Golub, bassist Chris Walker, and drummer Billy Kilson — all inspired choices neither had previously worked with. The fresh approaches of these new collaborators helps make Joined at the Hip unique from any previous James/Whalum recording."

== Track listing ==
1	"Soweto"	Kirk Whalum	10:02
2	"Kickin' Back"	Bob James	6:00
3	"Out of the Cold"	David LeVray, Kirk Whalum	5:19
4	"Deja Blue"	Bob James	8:15
5	"Midnight at the Oasis"	David Nichtern	5:45
6	"Tell Me Something Nice"	Bob James	7:17
7	"Tour de Fourths"	Bob James	6:35
8	"The Ghetto"	Donny Hathaway, Leroy Hutson	5:15
9	"The Prayer"	Kirk Whalum	8:31

== Personnel ==
- Bob James – keyboards
- Kirk Whalum – saxophones, chant (8)
- Jeff Golub – guitars
- Hiram Bullock – guitars (2, 5, 8)
- Chris Walker – bass, chant (8)
- Billy Kilson – drums
- Leonard "Doc" Gibbs – percussion (2–5, 9)
- Hilary James – vocals (5)
- Kevin Whalum – vocals (5), chant (8)
- Michael Colina – vocal arrangements (5)

=== Production ===
- Bob James – producer
- Ken Freeman – recording, mixing (1–7, 9)
- Bob Power – mixing (8)
- Larry Buksbaum – additional engineer
- John Bleich – assistant engineer
- Kevin Crouse – assistant engineer
- Tim Donovan – assistant engineer
- Andy Katz – assistant engineer
- Glen Marchese – assistant engineer
- John Montagnese – assistant engineer
- Ted Jensen – mastering at Sterling Sound (New York, NY)
- Marion Orr – production coordinator
- Linda Cobb Stalker – art direction, design
- Lyn Bradley – design
- Jeffrey Scales – photography
- Peter Paul – management for Bob James
- Earl Cole – management for Kirk Whalum
