= Mark Varney Project =

American short-lived music project

Truth in Shredding

Studio album by The Mark Varney Project
- Released: 1990
- Studio: Silverlake Sound Studios, Los Angeles; The Brewery, North County, San Diego; Front Page Recorders, Costa Mesa
- Genre: Jazz rock
- Length: 55:08
- Label: Legato
- Producer: Mark Varney, Frank Gambale

The Mark Varney Project chronology
Truth in Shredding (1990)	Centrifugal Funk (1991)

The Mark Varney Project (MVP) was a short-lived collaborative project put together by Mark Varney, brother of Shrapnel Records founder Mike Varney.

== Truth in Shredding ==
Truth in Shredding is the first studio album by the Mark Varney Project (MVP), released in 1990 through Legato Records and reissued on 4 November 2003, through Tone Center Records. Mark founded Legato in the 1980s, which served as a jazz-oriented counterpart to the rock stylings of Shrapnel. This line-up of the group features guitarists Frank Gambale and Allan Holdsworth. Besides one track written by Gambale, the rest are covers of existing jazz fusion compositions.

=== Critical reception ===
Professional ratings
Review scores
Source	Rating
AllMusic	4/5 stars

Robert Taylor at AllMusic awarded Truth in Shredding four stars out of five, calling it "a very intense fusion recording that can be an intimidating listen both in terms of technique and the consistent intensity maintained throughout." He recommended it for fans of jazz fusion, progressive and heavy metal, and particularly for younger fans of guitar music, saying they "will appreciate the extended solos and lack of any commercial hooks here." While highlighting Gambale and Holdsworth's outstanding playing abilities, Taylor noted that they "quickly run out of ideas and continuously revert back to familiar territory". Tom Brechtlein's drumming was praised as a "fine performance".

=== Track listing ===
No.	Title	Music	Length
1.	"Rocks"	Randy Brecker	7:01
2.	"Humpty Dumpty"	Chick Corea	6:31
3.	"The Fall"	Wayne Shorter	8:15
4.	"Not Ethiopia"	Michael Brecker	9:36
5.	"New Boots"	Frank Gambale	6:24
6.	"Ana Maria"	Shorter	9:15
7.	"Bathsheba"	Michael Brecker	8:16
Total length:			55:08

=== Personnel ===
- Frank Gambale – guitar, engineering, mixing, production
- Allan Holdsworth – guitar, SynthAxe, overdub engineering
- Freddie Ravel – keyboard
- Tom Brechtlein – drums
- Jimmy Earl – bass
- Steve Tavaglione – saxophone, EWI
- Robert M. Biles – engineering
- Mark Varney – executive production

Centrifugal Funk

Studio album by The Mark Varney Project
- Released: 1991
- Studio: Front Page Recorders, Costa Mesa, California; Kiva Recording, Memphis, Tennessee
- Genre: Jazz fusion
- Length: 61:18
- Label: Legato
- Producer: Mark Varney, Jimmy Earl

The Mark Varney Project chronology
Truth in Shredding (1990)	Centrifugal Funk (1991)

Alternative cover

== Centrifugal Funk ==
Centrifugal Funk is the second and final studio album by the Mark Varney Project (MVP), released in 1991 through Legato Records; a remastered edition was reissued in 2004 through Tone Center Records. This line-up of the group features guitarists Frank Gambale, Brett Garsed and Shawn Lane. The album consists primarily of covers of existing jazz fusion compositions, save for one track performed by Lane—"Lane's Blitz"—which he later dismissed as an impromptu warm-up rather than a planned solo, and thus his dislike for it. Varney has disputed Lane's version of events, but the track was omitted on the remaster.

The cover art on the original release features a tongue-in-cheek disclaimer to listeners: "Warning: Contains guitar performances of unparalleled speed, taste and virtuosity. Not for the faint of heart!", while the back cover has an invitation from Varney asking fans to send in demo tapes of potential guitarists for his label, in return for a named mention within the credits on a future album, as well as five Legato releases mailed to them for free.

=== Critical reception ===
Professional ratings
Review scores
Source	Rating
AllMusic	3/5 stars

Robert Taylor at AllMusic rated Centrifugal Funk three stars out of five, calling it "an exhausting listen" and the songs "fairly weak". Praise was given to the individual talents of Gambale, Garsed and Lane, while criticism was directed at drummer Joey Heredia. "Hey Tee Bone" and "Love Struck" were listed as highlights.

=== Track listing ===
No.	Title	Music	Length
1.	"Actual Proof"	Herbie Hancock	7:38
2.	"So What"	Miles Davis	9:44
3.	"Hey Tee Bone"	Tony Fisher, Timothius Davis	5:33
4.	"Tokyo Blue"	Najee, Morris Pleasure	7:20
5.	"Splatch"	Miles Davis	11:59
6.	"Elegant People"	Wayne Shorter	9:59
7.	"Lane's Blitz (Note: Not present on the 2004 remaster.)"	Shawn Lane	0:36
8.	"Lovestruck"	Jesse Johnson	8:29
Total length:			61:18

=== Personnel ===
- Frank Gambale – guitar (except track 7)
- Brett Garsed – guitar (tracks 2, 3, 8)
- Shawn Lane – guitar (tracks 2, 3, 5, 7, 8)
- Mike O'Neill – guitar (except track 7)
- T.J. Helmerich – guitar (track 8), remastering (reissue)
- Freddie Ravel – keyboard
- Joey Heredia – drums
- Kevin Ricard – percussion
- Jimmy Earl – bass, arrangement, production
- Steve Tavaglione – saxophone, EWI
- Alan Hirshberg – engineering, mixing, mastering
- Mark Varney – musical concept, executive production
