= Givin' It Up =

Studio album by George Benson and Al Jarreau
- Released: October 24, 2006
- Recorded: April 2006
- Genre: Jazz
- Length: 62:40
- Label: Concord
- Producers: Patti Austin; John Burk; Michael Broening; Chris Dunn; Marcus Miller; Freddie Ravel; Larry Williams

George Benson chronology
Irreplaceable (2003)	Givin' It Up (2006)	The Essential George Benson (2006)

Al Jarreau chronology
Accentuate the Positive (2004)	Givin' It Up (2006)	Christmas (2008)

Singles from Givin' It Up
- 1. "Morning" Released: 2006; 2. "Ordinary People" Released: 2006

Professional ratings
Review scores
Source	Rating
AllMusic	3.5/5 stars

Givin' It Up is a collaborative album by American musicians George Benson and Al Jarreau, released on October 24, 2006, by Concord Records. It contains songs previously recorded by both artists (Benson's "Breezin" and Jarreau's "Mornin" and original music. Other vocalists and musicians featured are Jill Scott, Patti Austin, Herbie Hancock, Stanley Clarke, Abe Laboriel, Chris Botti, Marcus Miller, and Paul McCartney. This project also includes standards by Billie Holiday ("God Bless the Child") and Sam Cooke ("Bring It On Home to Me"), pop songs by Seals and Crofts ("Summer Breeze") and Daryl Hall ("Everytime You Go Away") along with the jazz-swing "Four" by Miles Davis, and "Ordinary People" by John Legend.

In 2007, Benson was awarded his ninth (or tenth) and Jarreau was awarded his sixth Grammy Award for Best Traditional R&B Vocal Performance on "God Bless the Child" with Scott. Benson also won his tenth (or ninth) Grammy for Best Pop Instrumental Performance on "Mornin'", while "Breezin'" received a nomination for Best R&B Performance by a Duo or Group with Vocal.

== Track listing ==
No.	Title	Writer(s)	Length
1.	"Breezin'"	Bobby Womack, Al Jarreau	5:40
2.	"Mornin'"	Jarreau, David Foster, Jay Graydon	5:02
3.	"'Long Come Tutu"	Marcus Miller, Jarreau	6:37
4.	"God Bless the Child" (featuring Jill Scott)	Billie Holiday, Arthur Herzog, Jr.	3:40
5.	"Summer Breeze"	Jim Seals, Dash Crofts	5:01
6.	"All I Am"	Rex Rideout, Phillip "Taj" Jackson	3:23
7.	"Ordinary People"	John Legend, will.i.am	5:18
8.	"Let It Rain" (featuring Patti Austin)	Barry J. Eastmond, Jarreau	4:54
9.	"Givin' It Up for Love"	Freddie Ravel, Jarreau	3:57
10.	"Every Time You Go Away"	Daryl Hall	4:30
11.	"Four"	Miles Davis, Jon Hendricks	5:15
12.	"Don't Start No Schtuff"	Joe Turano, Jarreau	4:44
13.	"Bring It On Home to Me" (featuring Paul McCartney)	Sam Cooke	4:25

== Personnel ==
Musicians and vocalists

- George Benson – guitar, lead vocals (1, 3–6, 9–13), backing vocals (7)
- Al Jarreau – lead vocals (1–3, 5, 8–13), vocal percussion (1, 2, 4, 10), backing vocals (2, 7)
- Larry Williams – keyboards (1, 5), acoustic piano (5, 10)
- Michael Broening – keyboards (2, 7, 13), programming (2, 7), organ (13)
- Herbie Hancock – acoustic piano (3)
- Patrice Rushen – keyboards (3, 10, 12), Fender Rhodes (4, 6, 8, 13), acoustic piano (11)
- Rex Rideout – acoustic piano (6)
- Barry J. Eastmond – keyboards (8)
- Freddie Ravel – Rhodes electric piano (9), clavinet (9), organ (9), synthesizers (9), Moog bass (9), drums (9), percussion programming (9)
- Joe Turano – Wurlitzer electric piano (12), Hammond B3 organ (12)
- Randy Waldman – acoustic piano (13)
- Ray Fuller – guitar (1, 5)
- Dean Parks – guitar (1, 5, 10, 13), rhythm guitar (8)
- Freddie Fox – guitar (2, 7)
- Michael O'Neill – rhythm guitar (9)
- Michael Thompson – guitar (10)
- Abraham Laboriel – electric bass (1, 6, 13)
- Mel Brown – bass (2, 7)
- Marcus Miller – bass (3–5, 8, 10)
- Stanley Clarke – bass (11, 12)
- Vinnie Colaiuta – drums (1, 4, 5, 8, 10–13)
- Michael White – drums (2, 3, 7)
- Gregg Field – drums (6)
- Ricky Lawson – drums (6)
- Paulinho da Costa – percussion (1, 5, 8, 10, 13)
- Bashiri Johnson – percussion (8)
- Marion Meadows – saxophone (2, 7)
- Chris Botti – trumpet (8)
- Jill Scott – lead vocals (4)
- Patti Austin – lead and backing vocals (8)
- Maxi Anderson – backing vocals (8)
- Valerie Pinkston – backing vocals (8)
- Sharon Perry – backing vocals (8)
- Darlene Perry – backing vocals (8)
- Lorraine Perry – backing vocals (8)
- Sandra Simmons Williams – backing vocals (8)
- De'Ante Duckett – backing vocals (9, 13)
- Alethea Mills – backing vocals (9, 13)
- Chavonne Morris – backing vocals (9, 13)
- Paul McCartney – lead vocals (13)

Music arrangements

- Larry Williams – arrangements (1, 5, 10)
- Michael Broening – arrangements (2, 7)
- Marcus Miller – arrangements (3)
- George Benson – arrangements (4)
- John Burk – arrangements (4)
- Patrice Rushen – arrangements (4)
- Rex Rideout – arrangements (6)
- Barry J. Eastmond – arrangements (8)
- Al Jarreau – arrangements (8)
- Patti Austin – BGV arrangements (8)
- Freddie Ravel – arrangements (9), BGV arrangements (9)
- Fred Martin – BGV arrangements (9, 13)
- Joe Turano – arrangements (12)
- Randy Waldman – arrangements (13)

== Production ==
- Glen Barros – executive producer
- Kevin Lee – executive producer
- Noel Lee – executive producer
- John Burk – producer
- Michael Broening – producer (2, 7)
- Marcus Miller – co-producer (3)
- Patti Austin – producer (8)
- Barry J. Eastmond – additional production (8)
- Gregg Field – additional production (8)
- Freddie Ravel – producer (9)
- Larry Williams – co-producer (10)
- Chris Dunn – co-producer (11), A&R
- Mary Hogan – A&R administration
- Gerald McCauley – A&R production consultant
- Abbey Anna – art direction
- Andrew Pham – art direction, packaging design
- Riku Campo – grooming
- Heidi Meek – stylist
- Randee St. Nicholas – photography
- Turner Entertainment Group, Inc. – management for George Benson
- Tsunami Entertainment Group – management for Al Jarreau

Technical credits

- Doug Sax – mastering
- Sangwook Nam – mastering
- The Mastering Lab (Ojai, California) – mastering location
- Don Murray – main recording, recording engineer
- Michael Broening – recording engineer
- Myron Chandler – recording engineer
- Jeff Harris – recording engineer
- Charlie Paakkari – recording engineer
- Seth Presant – recording engineer, Pro Tools engineer, editing
- Bill Smith – recording engineer, Pro Tools engineer, editing
- German Villacorta – Pro Tools engineer
- Al Schmitt – mixing
- Kevin Becka – additional engineer
- Barry J. Eastmond – additional engineer
- Eric Ferguson – additional engineer
- Carlos Martinez – additional engineer
- Dennis Moody – additional engineer
- John Wroble – additional engineer
- Alex Pavlides – additional Pro Tools engineer
- Phillip Broussard – assistant engineer
- Keith Gretlein – assistant engineer
- Casey Lewis – assistant engineer
- Paul Smith – assistant engineer
- Steve Genewick – assistant mix engineer

== Charts ==
Chart (2006)	Peak position
Australian Albums (ARIA)	109
Billboard 200	58
Top R&B/Hip-Hop Albums	14
Jazz Albums	1

== Awards ==
2006 - 49th Annual GRAMMY Awards

Winner	Title	Category
George Benson	"Mornin'"	Best Pop Instrumental Performance
Al Jarreau, George Benson, Jill Scott	"God Bless the Child"	Best Traditional R&B Vocal Performance
