= In This Life (Kirk Whalum album) =

Studio album by Kirk Whalum
- Released: 1995
- Studio: Sunset Sound (Hollywood, California); O'Henry Sound Studios (Burbank, California); Record One (Los Angeles, California); Peace In The Valley Recording (Arleta, California); The Site (San Rafael, California); Nightingale Studio and The Doghouse (Nashville, Tennessee)
- Genre: Soul, Jazz
- Length: 59:24
- Label: Columbia
- Producer: Steve Buckingham; Anthony Smith (Track #6)

Kirk Whalum chronology
Caché (1993)	In This Life (1995)	Joined at the Hip (1996)

In This Life is the fourth album by jazz musician Kirk Whalum, released in 1995 on Columbia Records. The album was produced by Steve Buckingham. It reached No. 12 on the Billboard Top Contemporary Jazz Albums chart and No. 18 on the Billboard Top Jazz Albums chart.

== Critical reception ==
Professional ratings
Review scores
Source	Rating
AllMusic	3/5 stars

AllMusic rated the album 3 out of 5 stars.

== Track listing ==
1	"In This Life" (Mike Reid, Allen Shamblin)	3:36
2	"'Til I Get It Right'" (Larry Henley, Red Lane)	4:58
3	"Drowning in the Sea of Love" (Gamble and Huff)	7:02
4	"Peaceful Hideaway" (Anthony Smith, Kirk Whalum)	4:33
5	"I Wouldn't Be a Man" (Rory Michael Bourke, Mike Reid)	5:05
6	"Living for the City" (Stevie Wonder)	4:33
7	"My Father's Hope" (Richard Jackson)	4:27
8	"When The Night Rolls In" (Sally Dworsky, Brenda Russell, Rick Wayland	4:35
9	"I Turn To You" (Mike Reid, Allen Shamblin)	5:26
10	"Reck'n So" (Kirk Whalum)	3:58
11	"The Way I Need You" Now (Barry Alfonso, Mike Reid)	4:56
12	"Dan Cette Vie (In This Life)" (Barry Alfonso, Mike Reid)	6:15

== Personnel ==
- Kirk Whalum – tenor saxophone (1–5, 8–12), soprano saxophone (6, 7, 12), keyboard programming (6), drum programming (6)
- Mike Reid – vocals (1, 5, 9, 11)
- Vaneese Thomas – vocals (2)
- Teresa James – vocals (3, 8)
- Matt Rollings – acoustic piano (1, 2, 9, 11, 12), keyboards (8, 9, 12), organ (8, 11)
- Barry Beckett – acoustic piano (3), organ (3, 5), keyboards (5)
- Rick Jackson – keyboards (4, 7, 10)
- Wayne Killus – keyboard programming (6), drum programming (6)
- Anthony Smith – keyboard programming (6), drum programming (6)
- Brent Mason – guitars (2, 6, 8, 9, 12)
- Reggie Young – guitars (3, 5)
- Sonny Landreth – slide guitar (3)
- Larry Carlton – guitars (4, 10), acoustic guitar (7)
- Dwight Sills – guitars (4, 7, 10, 11)
- Don Potter – acoustic guitar (7, 11)
- Paul Franklin – pedabro (6), steel guitar (7)
- Mark O'Connor – fiddle (6)
- David Hungate – bass (2, 8, 9, 12)
- Willie Weeks – bass (3, 5)
- Cedric Lee – bass (4, 7, 10, 11)
- Ralph Penland – drums (2, 12)
- Owen Hale – drums (3, 5, 8, 9)
- Ricky Lawson – drums (4, 7, 11)
- Leon "Ndugu" Chancler – drums (10)
- Eddie Bayers – drums (12)
- Farrell Morris – vibraphone (2)
- Terry McMillan – percussion (3, 6, 8, 9, 11)
- Brian Kilgore – percussion (4, 7, 10)
- Mark Summer – cello (1)
- Dale Oehler – cello arrangements (1), string arrangements and conductor (2, 9, 12)
- Assa Drori – concertmaster (2, 9, 12)
- Bob Bailey – backing vocals (3, 5, 11)
- Louis Nunley – backing vocals (3, 5, 11)
- Duawne Starling – backing vocals (3, 5, 11)
- Chris Willis – backing vocals (3, 5, 11)

=== Production ===
- George Butler – executive producer
- Steve Buckingham – producer, arrangements
- Anthony Smith – producer (6)
- Kirk Whalum – arrangements
- George Massenberg – engineer, mixing
- Gary Paczosa – engineer
- Hal Sacks – engineer
- Toby Seay – engineer
- Richard Landers – assistant engineer
- John Paterno – assistant engineer
- Ed Simonton – assistant engineer
- Kevin Scott – mix assistant
- Denny Purcell – mastering at Georgetown Masters (Nashville, Tennessee)
- Carol Elliott – production coordinator
- Jennie Carey – production coordination assistant
- Risa Zaitschek – art direction, design
- Pamela Springsteen – photography
- Earl Cole for Cole Classic Management – management
