= Unconditional (Kirk Whalum album) =

Studio album by Kirk Whalum
- Released: October 17, 2000
- Studio: Dark Horse Recording (Franklin, Tennessee); Funky Joint Studios (Sherman Oaks, California); Bill Schnee Studios (North Hollywood, California); Nightowl Studios (Thousand Oaks, California); The Enterprise (Burbank, California)
- Genre: Jazz
- Length: 47:17
- Label: Warner Bros.
- Producer: Paul Brown

Kirk Whalum chronology
For You (1998)	Unconditional (2000)	Hymns in the Garden (2001)

Unconditional is a studio album by jazz musician Kirk Whalum, released in 2000 by Warner Bros. Records and produced by Paul Brown. The album reached No. 2 on the Billboard Top Contemporary Jazz Albums chart and No. 3 on the Billboard Top Jazz Albums chart.

Unconditional received a Grammy nomination for Best Pop Instrumental Album.

== Critical reception ==
Professional ratings
Review scores
Source	Rating
AllMusic	4/5 stars

Johnathan Widran of AllMusic opined "No doubt the title of Unconditional applies to the love of God that pervades his music and life, but like most of Whalum's efforts, this collection can be enjoyed by a wide audience."

== Track listing ==
Track no.	Song title	Songwriter(s)	Length
1	"Now 'Til Forever"	Kirk Whalum	04:36
2	"Groverworked & Underpaid"	Kirk Whalum	07:14
3	"God Must Have Spent A Little More Time on You"	Carl Sturken and Evan Rogers	04:45
4	"Unconditional"	Kirk Whalum	04:41
5	"Can't Stop the Rain"	Kirk Whalum featuring Shai	04:50
6	"Song for Evan"	Kirk Whalum	04:00
7	"I Try"	Macy Gray, Jinsoo Lim, Jeremy Ruzumna, David Wilder	03:54
8	"Playing with Fire"	Roberto Vally, Kirk Whalum	04:06
9	"Real Love"	Sue Ann Carwell, Kirk Whalum	04:25
10	"Waltz for David"	Kirk Whalum	04:46

== Personnel ==
- Kirk Whalum – tenor saxophone (1–8), arrangements (2, 4, 6, 9, 10), alto saxophone (9, 10), keyboards (9)
- Tim Heintz – keyboards (1), additional keyboards (2, 4, 6, 10), organ (7)
- Roberto Vally – keyboards (1, 8), bass (1, 8), arrangements (8)
- Greg Phillinganes – Rhodes electric piano (2, 4, 6), keyboards (10)
- Gregg Karukas – all other instruments (3), arrangements (3)
- Shai – keyboards (5), bass (5), vocals (5), arrangements (5)
- David "Kahlid" Woods – all other instruments (7), arrangements (7), drum programming (9)
- Tony Maiden – guitars (1, 5, 9)
- Paul Jackson Jr. – guitars (2, 4, 6, 10)
- Peter White – guitars (8)
- Alex Al – bass (2, 4, 6, 10)
- Paul Brown – drum programming (1, 8, 9), arrangements (1, 2, 6, 8)
- Lil' John Roberts – drums (2, 5, 6)
- Teddy Campbell – drums (4, 10)
- Lenny Castro – percussion (1)
- Luis Conte – percussion (2, 4, 6, 8–10)
- Jerry Hey – additional arrangements (4, 6)
- John Stoddart – backing vocals (1)
- Wendy Moten – vocals (9)
- Sue Ann Carwell – "do-doo's" vocals (9)

=== Production ===
- Paul Brown – producer, recording (1, 3, 5, 7–9), mixing (1–4, 6–8, 10)
- Ray Bardani – recording (2, 4, 6, 10), mixing (5, 9)
- Gregg Karukas – recording (3)
- Koji Egawa – assistant engineer
- Jeff Gregory – assistant engineer
- Thomas Johnson – assistant engineer
- Stewart Whitmore – digital editing
- Stephen Marcussen – mastering at Marcussen Mastering (Hollywood, California)
- Lexy Shroyer – production coordinator
- Mark Larson – art direction
- Richard Lee – photography
- Barbara Camp – grooming
- Laurita Shields – stylist
- Earl Cole – management
