= BWB (band) =

American jazz band

Braun-Whalum-Brown, better known as BWB, is a jazz band that is named after its three members: guitarist Norman Brown, saxophonist Kirk Whalum, and trumpeter Rick Braun.

== Discography ==
=== Albums ===
Year	Album	Peak chart positions					Label
Year	Album	US 200	US Top Sales	US Jazz	US Con. Jazz	US Top Cur	Label
2002	Groovin'	—	—	6	4	—	Warner Bros./WEA
2013	Human Nature	184	184	4	2	151	Heads Up/Concord
2016	bwb	—	—	4	1	—	Artistry/Mack Avenue
"—" denotes a recording that did not chart.

=== Singles ===
Year	Title	Peak chart positions	Album
Year	Title	Smooth Jazz Airplay	Album
2002	—	—N/a	Groovin'
2013	"Man in the Mirror"	3	Human Nature
2014	"Shake Your Body (Down to the Ground)"	1	Human Nature
2014	"Billie Jean"	22	Human Nature
2016	"bwb"	1	bwb
2016	"Triple Dare"	1	bwb
2017	"I Want You Girl"	4	bwb
"—" denotes a recording that did not chart.

=== Session ===
- "Hoddamile (Hot Or Mild)" from Into My Soul, Kirk Whalum (2003, Warner Bros./WEA)
- "Can We Talk" from Kirk Whalum Performs the Babyface Songbook, Kirk Whalum (2005, Rendezvous/Mack Avenue)
- "It Ain't Over BWB" from Stay with Me, Norman Brown (2007, Peak/Concord)
