= Accentuate the Positive (Al Jarreau album) =

Studio album by Al Jarreau
- Released: August 3, 2004
- Studio: Capitol Studios (Hollywood, California)
- Genre: Jazz; soul; funk
- Length: 48:37
- Label: GRP Records
- Producer: Tommy LiPuma

Al Jarreau chronology
All I Got (2002)	Accentuate the Positive (2004)	Givin' It Up (2006)

Professional ratings
Review scores
Source	Rating
Allmusic	4/5 stars

Accentuate the Positive is an album of songs from the 1940s, recorded in 2004 by singer Al Jarreau. In 2005 the album received a Grammy Award nomination for Best Jazz Vocal Album.

== Track listing ==
1. "Cold Duck" (Eddie Harris, Jarreau) - 3:46
2. "The Nearness of You" (Hoagy Carmichael, Ned Washington) - 3:43
3. "I'm Beginning to See the Light" (Duke Ellington, Don George, Johnny Hodges, Harry James) - 4:04
4. "My Foolish Heart" (Ned Washington, Victor Young) - 5:32
5. "Midnight Sun" (Lionel Hampton, Sonny Burke, Johnny Mercer) - 6:01
6. "Accentuate the Positive" (Harold Arlen, Johnny Mercer) - 4:03
7. "Betty Bebop's Song" (Jarreau, Freddie Ravel) - 4:16
8. "Waltz for Debby" (Bill Evans, Gene Lees) - 4:44
9. "Groovin' High" (Dizzy Gillespie, Jarreau) - 4:11
10. "Lotus" (Don Grolnick, Jarreau) - 5:11
11. "Scootcha Booty" (Russell Ferrante, Jarreau) - 4:26

== Personnel ==
- Al Jarreau – vocals
- Larry Williams – keyboards and arrangements (2, 4, 5–10)
- Larry Goldings – Hammond B3 organ (3)
- Russell Ferrante – acoustic piano (11)
- Anthony Wilson – guitars
- Christian McBride – bass (1, 2, 5, 6, 8–10)
- Dave Carpenter – bass (4, 7, 11)
- Mark Simmons – drums (1, 5, 6)
- Peter Erskine – drums (2–4, 7–11)
- Luis Conte – percussion (1, 4, 6, 10)
- Keith Anderson – tenor saxophone (1, 6)
- Tollak Ollestad – harmonica (5)

== Production ==
- Bill Darlington – executive producer, management
- Tommy LiPuma – producer
- Al Schmitt – recording, mixing
- Steve Genewick – assistant engineer
- Doug Sax – mastering
- Robert Hadley – mastering
- The Mastering Lab (Hollywood, California) – mastering location
- Shari Sutcliffe – production coordinator
- Hollis King – art direction
- Rika Ichiki – design
- Rocky Schenck – photography
- Al Jarreau – liner notes
