= Play Date (album) =

Studio album by Euge Groove
- Released: July 2002
- Studio: Fantasy Studios (Berkeley, California); Funky Joint Studios (Sherman Oaks, California); On The Mark Studio (Studio City, California); Planet One Studios (Camarillo, California); Sunset Sound Recorders (Hollywood, California); Track Studios and Schnee Studios (North Hollywood, California); Woody Reed Studios (Woodland Hills, California); Alpha Studios (Burbank, California)
- Genre: Vocal jazz, jazz
- Length: 48:34
- Label: Warner Bros.
- Producer: Paul Brown; Michael Egizi; Euge Groove

Euge Groove chronology
Euge Groove (2000)	Play Date (2002)	Livin' Large (2004)

Professional ratings
Review scores
Source	Rating
AllMusic	3/5 stars
Jazz Times	(favourable)

Play Date is the second studio album of saxophonist Euge Groove issued in July 2002 by Warner Bros. Records. The album rose to No. 10 on the Billboard Contemporary Jazz Albums chart and No. 13 on the Billboard Jazz Albums chart.

== Track listing ==
No.	Title	Writer(s)	Length
1.	"Slam Dunk"	Steve Grove, David Kahlid Woods	3:48
2.	"From the Top"	Michael Egizi, Steve Grove	5:52
3.	"Gonna B Alright"	Steve Grove	4:33
4.	"Let's Get It On"	Marvin Gaye, Ed Townsend	4:40
5.	"Rewind"	Steve Grove	4:37
6.	"Love Me"	Michael Egizi, Steve Grove	4:40
7.	"Hide and Seek"	Michael Egizi, Steve Grove	4:21
8.	"Belle Maria"	Steve Grove	4:23
9.	"Playdate"	Steve Grove	5:53
10.	"With You I'd Believe"	Steve Grove	5:47

== Personnel ==
Musicians

- Euge Groove – tenor saxophone (1–5, 7, 8), additional drum programming (2), soprano saxophone (5–7, 9), alto saxophone (10)
- Paul Brown – programming (1), additional drum programming (2)
- David "Kahlid" Woods – programming (1), guitars (1), keyboards (3), drum programming (3)
- Michael Egizi – baby grand piano (2), synthesizer programming (2, 5), drum programming (2, 5–7), Fender Rhodes (5), keyboards (6, 7)
- Chester Thompson – Hammond B3 organ (2, 4)
- Larry Williams – synth strings (3)
- Herman Jackson – Wurlitzer electric piano (4), organ (4), synthesizers (4, 9), Fender Rhodes (9)
- Freddie Ravel – Rhodes electric piano (8)
- Mark Portmann – keyboards (8, 10), programming (8, 10)
- Paul Jackson Jr. – guitars (2–4, 6)
- Tony Maiden – guitars (5, 7)
- Peter White – guitars (8)
- Dean Parks – acoustic guitar (10), electric guitar (10)
- Alex Al – bass guitar (2, 5–8, 10)
- Larry Kimpel – upright bass (4), electric bass (9)
- Teddy Campbell – drums (4, 9)
- Paulinho da Costa – percussion (3, 4, 9)
- Luis Conte – percussion (5, 7)
- Stacy Campbell – vocals (6)

Music arrangements

- Paul Brown – arrangements (1, 3, 4, 8, 9)
- David "Kahlid" Woods – arrangements (1, 3)
- Michael Egizi – arrangements (2, 5–7)
- Euge Groove – arrangements (2, 5)
- Jerry Hey – synth string arrangements (3)
- Steve Dubin – arrangement inspiration (4)
- Mark Portmann – arrangements (8, 10)

== Production ==
- Paul Brown – executive producer, producer (1, 3, 4, 9)
- Michael Egizi – producer (2, 5–7)
- Euge Groove – producer (2, 5–8, 10)
- Lexy Shroyer – production coordinator
- Katherine Delaney – art direction, design
- Mando Gonzales – photography
- Bill Darlington – management

Technical credits

- Stephen Marcussen – mastering
- Stewart Whitmore – digital editing
- Marcussen Mastering (Hollywood, California) – editing and mastering location
- Paul Brown – mixing (1–4, 6–9)
- Ray Bardani – mixing (4)
- Bill Schnee – mixing (5, 10)
- Stephen Hart – tracking engineer
- Don Murray – live tracking engineer
- Ryan Castle – second engineer
- Ai Fujisaki – second engineer
