= Freddie Ravel =

American keyboardist

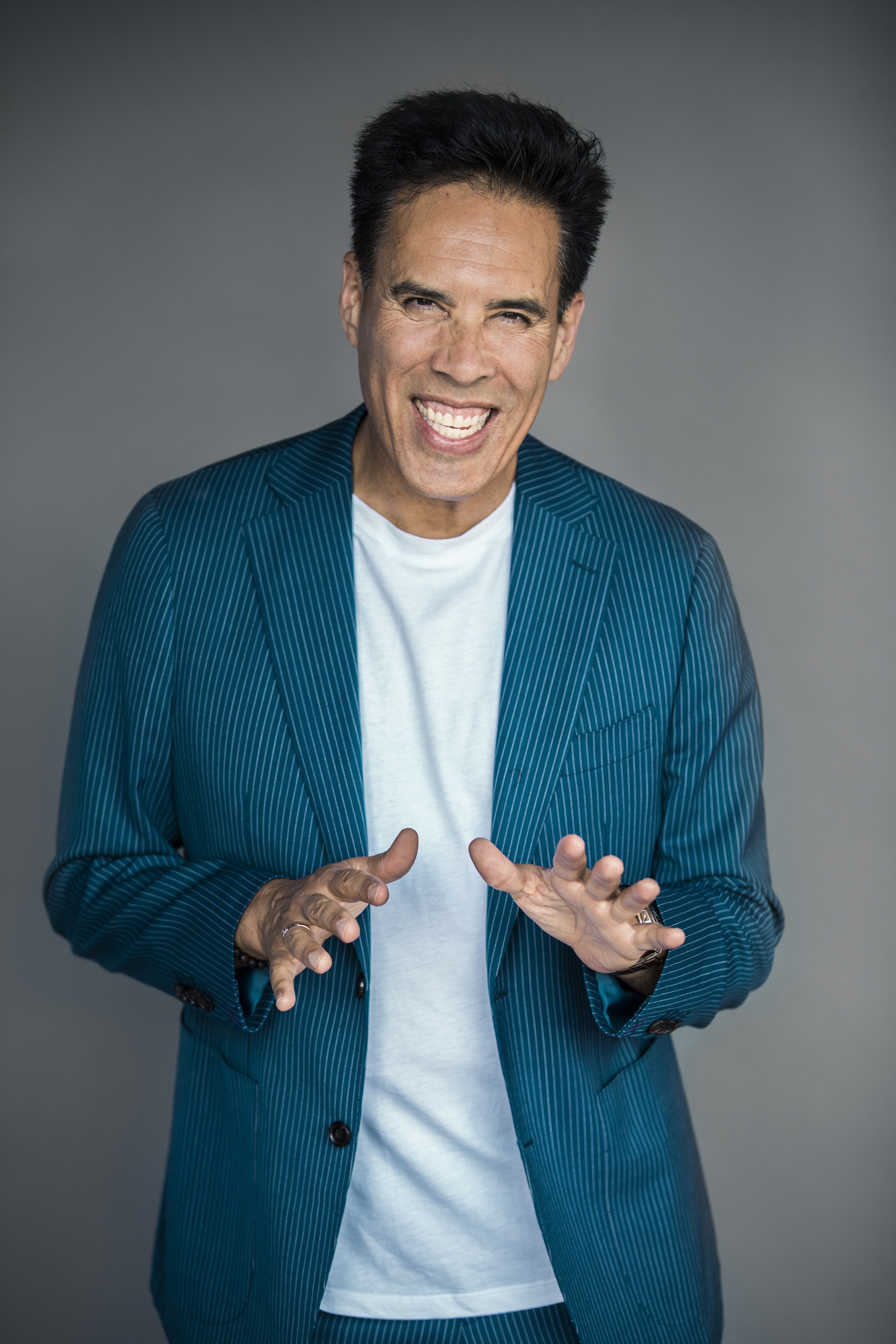

Background information
- Genres: R&B, funk, jazz, latin, soul
- Occupations: Musician, songwriter
- Label: Universal
- Formerly of: Earth, Wind & Fire

Freddie Ravel is an American keyboardist, keynote speaker, author, composer and recording artist. He served as the musical director of the band Earth, Wind & Fire. Ravel's also worked with the likes of Sergio Mendes, Carlos Santana, Madonna and Al Jarreau.

== Biography ==
Ravel was born and bred in Los Angeles to a Ukrainian-German-Polish father and a Colombian mother. He started playing the accordion at the age of 7 then moved on to play the drums, guitar and eventually the piano. He later received his Bachelor's Degree in Music graduating with cum laude honors from California State University. Ravel began performing around the world at age 23 with Brazilian icon Sergio Mendes where he was later signed by Universal Records. He eventually released three solo studio albums; Midnight Passion, Sol to Soul and Freddie Ravel.

During 1988 Ravel became the musical director for Indian violinist L. Subramaniam. Within the following year he became a member of Sergio Mendes's band. Ravel went on to join Earth, Wind & Fire in 1992 as the band's musical director. He thus played on their 1993 album Millennium. Millennium has since been certified Gold in Japan by the RIAJ. He also featured on Flora Purim's 1994 album Speed of Light. After four years with EWF he went on perform with Madonna on the soundtrack of the 1996 feature film Evita. He also played on Peter White's 1997 LP Songs of the Season. During 1998 Ravel became Jazz musician Al Jarreau's musical director. He went on to produce Jarreau on his 2000 album Tomorrow Today. The album rose to No. 2 on the Billboard Jazz Albums chart.

Ravel later performed and co-wrote on Jarreau's 2002 album All I Got. He then played on Euge Groove's 2002 LP Play Date and Earth, Wind and Fire's 2003 album The Promise. Ravel composed on Jarreau's 2004 album, Accentuate The Positive, then played on and co-composed the tune "Givin' It Up" from the double Grammy Award-winning 2006 eponymous album by Al Jarreau and George Benson.

Alongside Maya Angelou, Muhammad Ali, Deepak Chopra and Stevie Wonder, he co-wrote the 2017 book Open My Eyes, Open My Soul. This took place via an invitation to Ravel from Yolanda King, Dr. Martin Luther King Jr's eldest daughter.

On November 17, 2012, Ravel was officially knighted by the Knights of St. John, champions of hospitals and health care for the past 1000+ years. Ravel would later be dubbed a "Keynote Maestro" by the City of Los Angeles for "renewing the national and international economy" through his Life in Tune system.

== Discography ==
- Freddie Ravel Solo Artist albums:
  - Midnight Passion (1991)
  - Sol to Soul (1995)
  - Sol to Soul (DTS 5.1 Surround) (1997)
  - Freddie Ravel (2000)
  - If Music Could Speak (2014)
- Carlos Santana: Guitar Heaven: The Greatest Guitar Classics of All Time (2010)
- Earth, Wind & Fire: Millennium (1993)
- Earth, Wind & Fire: The Promise (2003)
- George Benson and Al Jarreau: Givin' It Up (2006)
- Madonna: Evita: Music from the Motion Picture (1996)
- Al Jarreau: Tomorrow Today (2000)
- Al Jarreau: The Very Best of: An Excellent Adventure (2009)
- Al Jarreau: All I Got (2002)
- Allan Holdsworth & Frank Gambale: Truth in Shredding (1990)
- Andrew Lloyd Weber / Madonna: You Must Love Me (1996)
- Dori Caymmi: Brazilian Serenata Quincy Jones' Qwest Records (1991)
- Flora Purim: Speed of Light
- Frank Gambale: Thunder from Down Under (2001)
- Justo Almario: Family Time (1989)
- Ladd McIntosh: Ladd McIntosh Big Band – Energy (1982)
- Mark Varney Project: Truth in Shredding (1990)
- Mark Varney Project: Centrifugal Funk (1991)
- Osamu Kitajima: Sweet Chaos (1990)
- Osamu Kitajima: Behind The Light (1991)
- Peter White: Songs of the Season (1997)
- Ricardo Silviera: Amazon Secrets (1990)
- Richard Smith]: Soulidified(2003)
- Robert Mitchum: Nice Girls Don't Stay for Breakfast (2018 documentary)

== Film and TV ==
- The Truth, The Journey Within, Release 2024
- Kill Fee (aka Ulterior Motives)
- Against the Ropes – "All I've Got"
- Mississippi Masala
- Help!
- Never Think About Music The Same Again: Freddie Ravel and Life in Tune
- The Action Catalyst: "Rhythm of Success with Freddie Ravel (Music, Piano, Business, Leadership)"
- The Power of Being There (Hour of Power with Bobby Schuller)
