= Colors (Kirk Whalum album) =

Studio album by Kirk Whalum
- Released: September 23, 1997
- Studio: Valerian Studio, Sound On Sound and Sony Music Studios (New York City, New York); GBT Studio and Sound Kitchen (Franklin, Tennessee); Wright Studios, The Doghouse and Quad Studios (Nashville, Tennessee); Sony Music Studios (Los Angeles, California); Adwin Studios (Hollywood, California); WallyWorld Studios (Marin County, California); Peace In The Valley Recording (Arleta, California); Alpha Studios (Burbank, California)
- Genre: Jazz
- Length: 49:06
- Label: Warner Bros.
- Producer: Philippe Saisse; Kirk Whalum; Paul Brown; Oji Pierce; Tommy Sims

Kirk Whalum chronology
Joined at the Hip (1996)	Colors (1997)	For You (1998)

Colors is a studio album by jazz artist Kirk Whalum, released in 1997 on Warner Bros. Records. The album reached No. 10 on the Billboard Top Contemporary Jazz Albums chart and No. 13 on the Billboard Top Jazz Albums chart.

== Overview ==
Colors was produced by Kirk Whalum, Philippe Saisse, Tommy Sims, Paul Brown and Oji Pierce. Artists such as Alison Krauss, Howard Hewett and Michael McDonald also appeared on the album.

== Track listing ==
Track	Song title	Songwriter(s)	Length
1	"Cannonnesque"	Philippe Saisse, Kirk Whalum	5:30
2	"All I Need"	Philippe Saisse, Kirk Whalum	4:52
3	"Daddy Loves You"	Kirk Whalum	4:17
4	"Strength in You"	Gerald Albright, Oji Pierce, Kirk Whalum	4:11
5	"If Only for One Night"	Brenda Russell	4:35
6	"Escolhido (Chosen)"	Kirk Whalum	6:53
7	"Open My Eyes"	Philippe Saisse, Kirk Whalum	4:15
8	"After All This Time"	Oji Pierce, Kirk Whalum	4:33
9	"Natchez"	Philippe Saisse, Kirk Whalum	6:24
10	"The Back Porch"	Tommy Sims	3:36

== Personnel ==
- Kirk Whalum – tenor saxophone, arrangements (1, 3, 6), keyboards (3), programming (3)
- Philippe Saisse – keyboards (1, 2, 7, 9), programming (1, 2, 7, 9), arrangements (1, 2, 7, 9)
- Paul Brown – additional programming (1, 3, 4, 8), arrangements (5)
- Leon Pendarvis – Hammond B3 organ (2)
- Bill Cantos – additional keyboards (3), keyboards (6)
- Marc Q. Harris – Hammond B3 organ (3)
- Oji Pierce – keyboards (4, 8), programming (4, 8), additional keyboards (6)
- Sandy Jenkins – additional programming (4)
- Dan Shea – keyboards (5), programming (5), arrangements (5)
- Tommy Sims – keyboard programming (10), bass (10), rhythm and string arrangements (10)
- Nick Moroch – electric guitar (1, 7)
- Mark Baldwin – guitars (3)
- Paul Jackson Jr. – guitars (4–6)
- Dwight Sills – guitars (8)
- Marc Antoine – acoustic guitar (9)
- Chris Rodriguez – acoustic guitar (10)
- Stuart Duncan – mandolin (10), violin (10)
- Chris Minh Doky – acoustic bass (1)
- Ron Jenkins – bass (2, 9)
- Gerald Albright – bass (4), alto saxophone (4)
- Abraham Laboriel – bass (6)
- Dwayne "Smitty" Smith – bass (8)
- Sean McCurley – additional drums (3)
- Chester Thompson – additional drums (4)
- Bill Maxwell – drums (6)
- Luis Conte – percussion (6)
- Justo Almario – soprano saxophone (6)
- Curtis King – vocals (2)
- Vaneese Thomas – vocals (2)
- Lynne Fiddmont – vocals (4)
- Kevin Whalum – vocals (4), additional backing vocals (8)
- Howard Hewett – vocals (8)
- Alison Krauss – vocals (10)
- Michael McDonald – vocals (10)

== Production ==
- Earl Cole – executive producer, management
- Randy Jackson – executive producer
- Matt Pierson – executive producer
- Kirk Whalum – executive producer, producer (1–4, 6, 8, 9)
- Philippe Saisse – producer (1, 2, 7, 9)
- Oji Pierce – producer (4, 8)
- Paul Brown – producer (5)
- Tommy Sims – producer (10)
- Joel Zimmerman – art direction, design
- Tracey Landworth – photography

Technical

- Stephen Marcussen – mastering at Precision Mastering (Hollywood, California)
- Ron Boustead – digital editing at Precision Mastering
- Roy Hendrickson – engineer (1, 2, 7, 9)
- Paul Brown – mixing (1–5, 7–9), engineer (5)
- Keith Compton – engineer (4)
- Oji Pierce – engineer (4, 8)
- Hal Sacks – engineer (4, 6), additional engineer (8)
- David Schober – engineer (4)
- Toby Seay – engineer (4)
- Gary Paczosa – mixing (6, 10)
- Martin Woodlee – engineer (10)
- Brian Tankersley – additional engineer (2), engineer (3)
- Sandy Jenkins – additional engineer (3)
- Tony Alvarez – additional engineer (8)
- Charles Nasser – assistant engineer (1–5, 7–9)
- Chipman Verspyck – assistant engineer (1, 7)
- Christian Wicht – assistant engineer (1, 7)
- Tim Coyle – assistant engineer (2, 4, 6, 8–10)
- Rob Williams – assistant engineer (2, 9)
- Jen Wyler – assistant engineer (2, 9)
- Troy Gonzalez – assistant engineer (4, 6, 8)
