= And You Know That =

Studio album by Kirk Whalum
- Released: 1988
- Studio: Minot Sound (White Plains, New York); BearTracks Studios (Suffern, New York); Remidi Studio (Ardsley-on-Hudson, New York); Sunrise Sound Studios (Houston, Texas)
- Genre: Soul, jazz
- Length: 41:12
- Label: Columbia
- Producer: Bob James

Kirk Whalum chronology
| And You Know That (1988) | The Promise (1989) |

And You Know That is the second album by jazz musician Kirk Whalum, released in 1988 on Columbia Records. The album stayed at number one for three weeks on the Billboard Top Contemporary Jazz Albums chart.

== Overview ==
And You Know That was produced by Bob James.

== Critical reception ==
Professional ratings
Review scores
| Source | Rating |
|---|---|
| AllMusic | 4/5 stars |

With a four out of five star rating, Ron Wynn of Allmusic described the album as "Light pop/fusion though Whalum's a very good player."

== Track listing ==
1. "Give Me Your Love" (Kirk Whalum) -7:15
2. " The Wave" (Nat Adderley Jr.) - 5:28
3. "Through the Fire" (David Foster, Tom Keane, Cynthia Weil) - 6:01
4. "Seryna" (Bob James) - 5:48
5. "Don't Look At Me (In That Tone Of Voice)" (Kirk Whalum) - 5:21
6. "Where I Come From" (Kirk Whalum) - 4:55
7. "Glow" (Kirk Whalum) - 6:30

== Personnel ==
- Kirk Whalum – saxophones, rhythm arrangements (1, 3), arrangements (5, 7)
- Bob James – keyboards (1, 3, 4), synthesizer arrangements (1, 3), vocal arrangements (1)
- Larry Fast – synthesizers (2)
- Rick Jackson – keyboards (5, 7)
- Alvin King – organ (6)
- Dean Brown – guitars (1, 3, 4, 6)
- Doc Powell – guitars (2)
- Tod Vullo – guitars (5, 7)
- Gary King – bass (1)
- Schuyler Deale – bass (3)
- Donald Patterson – bass (5, 7)
- Yogi Horton – drums (1, 3, 4, 6)
- Buddy Williams – drums (2)
- Steve Summer – drums (5, 7)
- Leonard "Doc" Gibbs – percussion (1, 3, 6)
- Errol "Crusher" Bennett – percussion (2)
- Kuko Miranda – percussion (5)
- Nat Adderley Jr. – vocal arrangements (1), arrangements (2)
- Lisa Fischer – vocals (1)
- Kevin Owens – vocals (1)
- V. Michael Kay and the Redeemed Family Ensemble – choir (6)
- V. Michael Kay – choral arrangements (6)
- Yolanda Adams – vocal soloist (6)
- Gary Bunton – vocal soloist (6)
- Ken Williams – vocal soloist (6)

=== Production ===
- Bob James – producer, additional recording
- Joe Jorgensen – engineer, mixing
- Les Williams – additional recording
- Ed Brown – assistant engineer
- Chris Bubbacz – assistant engineer
- Iris Cohen – assistant engineer
- Wayne Warnecke – assistant engineer
- Harry Hirsch – digital mastering at Digital House (New York City, New York)
- Vlado Meller – mastering at CBS Mastering Studios (New York City, New York)
- Marion Orr – album coordinator
- Joel Zimmerman – art direction
- Hans Neleman – photography
- Peter Paul – management
