= Chris Walker (musician) =

American musician and producer

- Origin: Houston, Texas, U.S.
- Genres: R&B, jazz
- Occupation: Singer
- Instrument: Bass guitar
- Years active: 1981–present
- Labels: CCW Global, Canvas Records, Pendulum Records

Chris Walker is an American musician and producer, who sings R&B and plays the bass guitar. He is best known for his 1992 Billboard Hot 100 top 40 hit "Take Time", and his 1993 single "How Do You Heal a Broken Heart" & " Everything Will Be Alright". Walker has released five albums under the Pendulum Records, and Canvas Records labels.

== Early life ==
Walker was born and raised in Houston, Texas, where he began singing before speaking; he got his start in the church as a member of his family gospel group, The Walker Brothers. Walker plays the bass upside down, similar to one of his guitar heroes, Jimi Hendrix.

Walker then moved to New York City, New York, where he became Ornette Coleman's bass guitarist for two and a half years before releasing his debut album. He then toured with Regina Belle, where he soon became a musical director. When Belle noticed his voice, she gradually worked his vocals into her act; Walker credits her for teaching him to find his voice.

== Music career ==
In 1991, Walker released his debut album First Time, under the Pendulum Records label; the album featured two Top Five R&B hits, "Giving You All My Love" and "Take Time", which peaked at #29 on the Billboard Hot 100. Walker then released his second album Sincerely Yours in 1993, which featured the single "How Do You Heal a Broken Heart", which has received over 59 million views on Youtube.

As a solo artist, Walker remained absent from the public music scene for a decade before releasing two more albums, I Know It's Love (2005), and Zone (2011). Walker's music is popular in countries such as South Africa, where he performed with Belle in the Soul & Jazz Experience in 2019; he also performed a sold-out show at the Sun Arena in Pretoria, honoring the late Eddie Zondi.

In 2019, Walker released his latest album We're in This Love Together - Celebrating Al Jarreau, which was a tribute to the late singer, who died in 2017. The album featured artists such as Belle, Gerald Albright, Randy Brecker, Rick Braun, Will Downing, Nathan East, David Foster, Bob James, Paul Jackson Jr, Dave Koz, Bobby Lyle, Marcus Miller, Greg Phillinganes, Arturo Sandoval, Mark Simmons, Kirk Whalum and many more; this album was produced by Walker and Larry Williams.

== Discography ==
=== Solo albums ===
- 1991: First Time (Pendulum Records)
- 1993: Sincerely Yours (Pendulum Records)
- 2005: I Know It's Love (Canvas Records)
- 2011: Zone (Pendulum Records)
- 2019: We're in This Love Together - Celebrating Al Jarreau

=== Solo singles ===
- 1991: "Giving You All My Love"
- 1992: "Take Time"
- 1992: "No Place Like Love"
- 1993: "Love Tonight"
- 1994: "How Do You Heal a Broken Heart"
- 2019: "We're in This Love Together"
- 2022: "Because I Love You"
