= Kirk Whalum =

American jazz saxophonist and songwriter (born 1958)

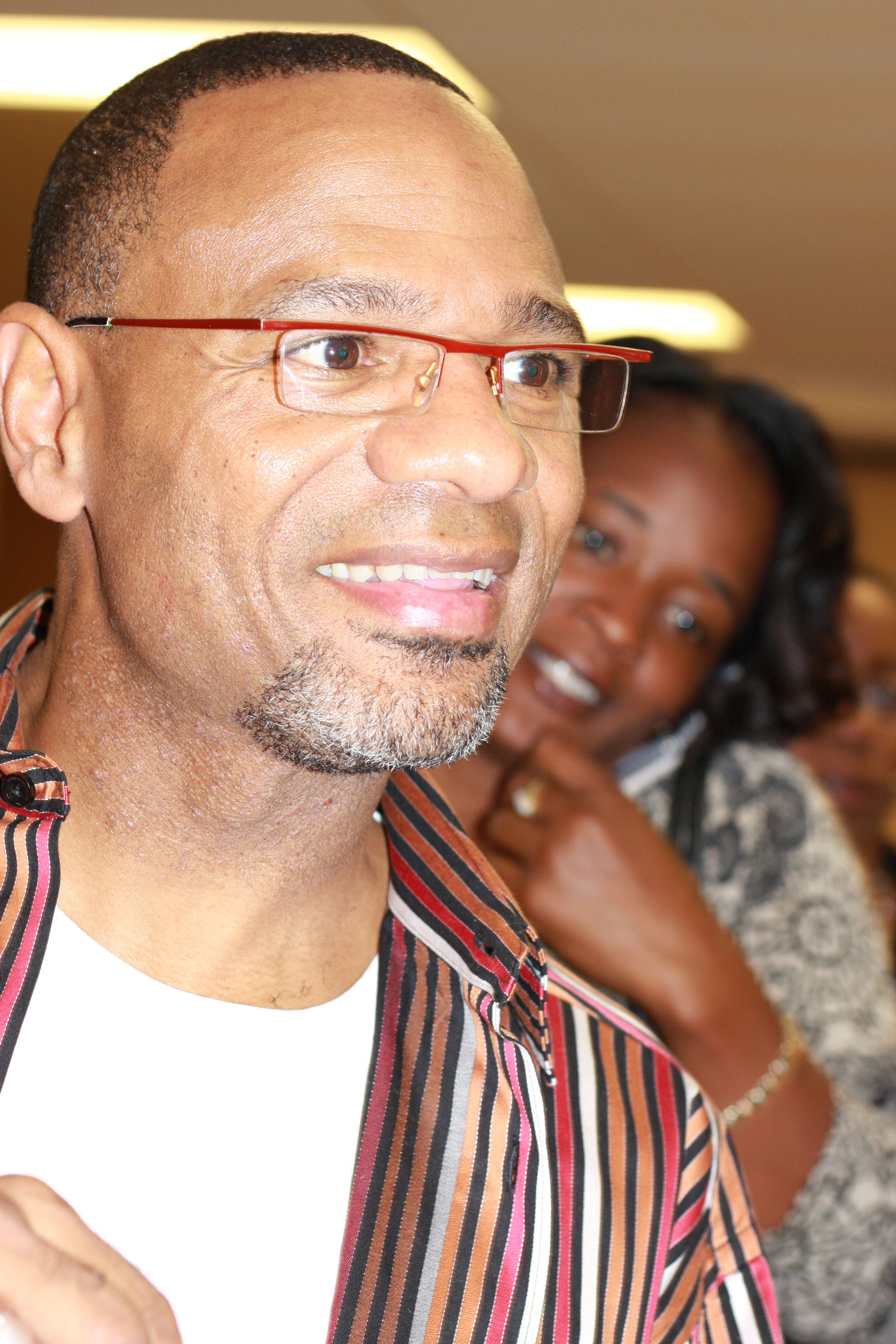
- Whalum in 2007

Background information
- Born: July 11, 1958 (age 68); Memphis, Tennessee, U.S.
- Genres: Smooth jazz, pop, R&B, gospel
- Occupation: Musician
- Instruments: Saxophone, flute
- Years active: 1985–present
- Labels: Warner Bros., Sony, Columbia
- Website: kirkwhalum.com

Kirk Whalum (born July 11, 1958) is an American R&B and smooth jazz saxophonist and songwriter. He has recorded a series of commercially successful and critically acclaimed solo studio albums, as well as several film soundtracks, with his music spanning a range of genres from pop to R&B to smooth jazz. Whalum has received one Grammy Award from a total of 12 nominations.

Whalum is a member, together with trumpeter Rick Braun and guitarist Norman Brown, of jazz group BWB, and has also worked with artists such as Whitney Houston, Bob James, Jonathan Butler and Quincy Jones. Among others with whom Whalum has collaborated are Michael McDonald, Chante Moore, Luther Vandross, Patrice Rushen, Will Downing and Brian Culbertson.

== Biography ==
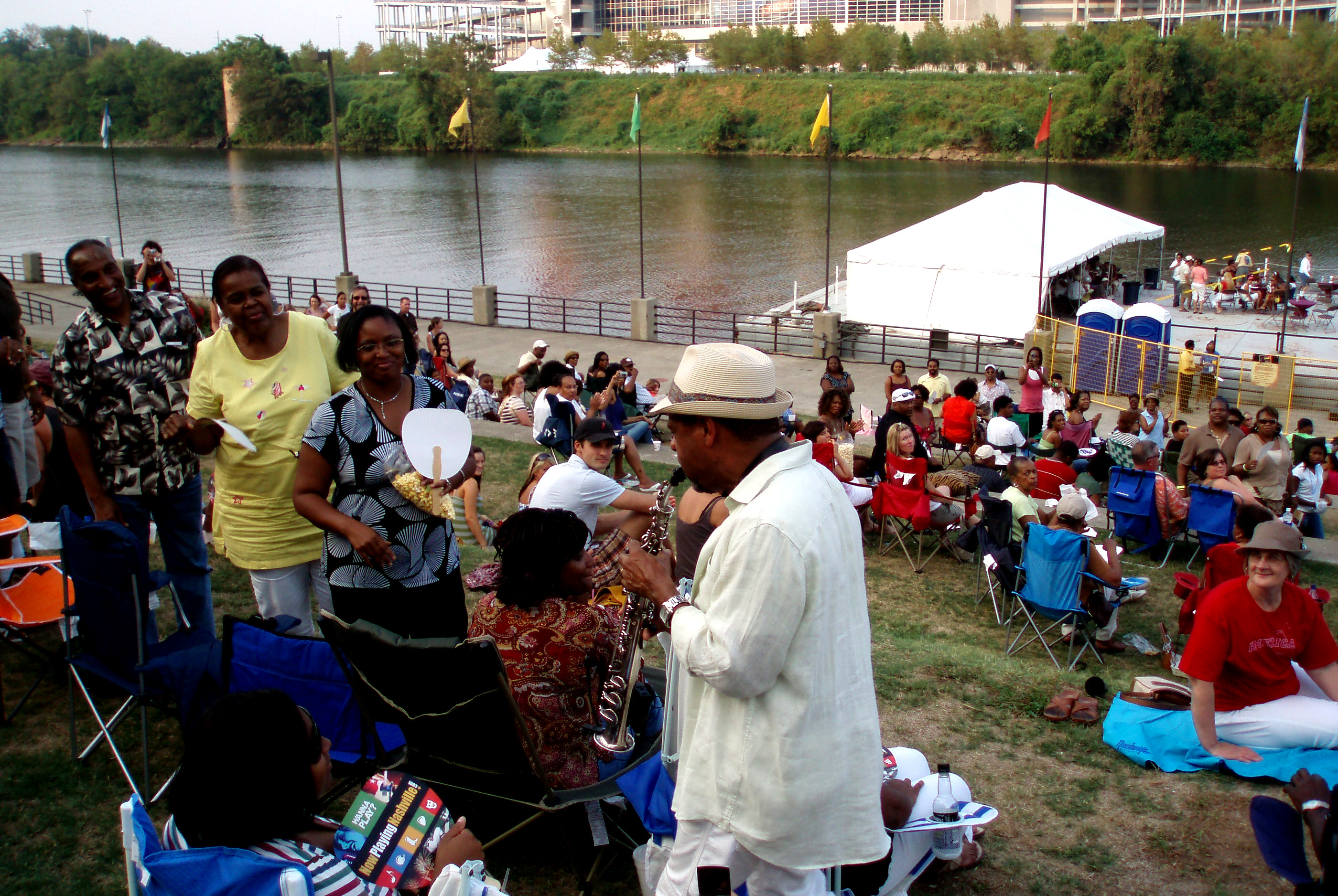
Whalum at a music festival in Nashville in 2007.

Kirk Whalum was born and raised in Memphis, Tennessee, United States. He attended Melrose High School and Texas Southern University, where he was a member of the renowned Ocean of Soul Marching Band. In addition to singing in his father's church choir, Whalum learned to love music from his grandmother, Thelma Twigg Whalum, a piano teacher, and two uncles, Wendell Whalum and Hugh "Peanuts" Whalum, who performed with jazz bands around the country. Whalum told John H. Johnson's magazine Ebony Man in a 1994 profile: "The music I like to play and write encompasses the four elements I grew up with: Memphis R&B, gospel, rock, and jazz. The emphasis, though, is on melody, period."

In 1986, he performed at Jean-Michel Jarre's giant concerts Rendez-Vous Houston and Rendez-Vous Lyon. At each concert, he performed the track "Last Rendez-Vous", also known as "Ron's Piece", in place of Jarre and Whalum's mutual friend, saxophonist and astronaut Ron McNair, who was to have performed but had died in the Challenger disaster.

In 1993, Whalum recorded a duet with R&B singer Jevetta Steele called "Love is a Losing Game".

Whalum has worked on a number of film scores, including for The Prince of Tides, Boyz n the Hood, The Bodyguard, Grand Canyon and Cousins. He toured with Whitney Houston for more than seven years and soloed in her single "I Will Always Love You", the best-selling single by a female artist in music history. He has also been featured on many Luther Vandross albums, most often playing on the singer's covers of older pop and R&B standards such as "Anyone Who Had a Heart", "I (Who Have Nothing)", and "Love Won't Let Me Wait".

Whalum has recorded a series of well received solo albums and film soundtracks, with music ranging from pop to R&B to smooth jazz. His musical accomplishments have brought him a total of 12 Grammy nominations. He won his first Grammy award in 2011 for Best Gospel Song ("It's What I Do", featuring Lalah Hathaway) alongside lifelong friend and writer Jerry Peters.

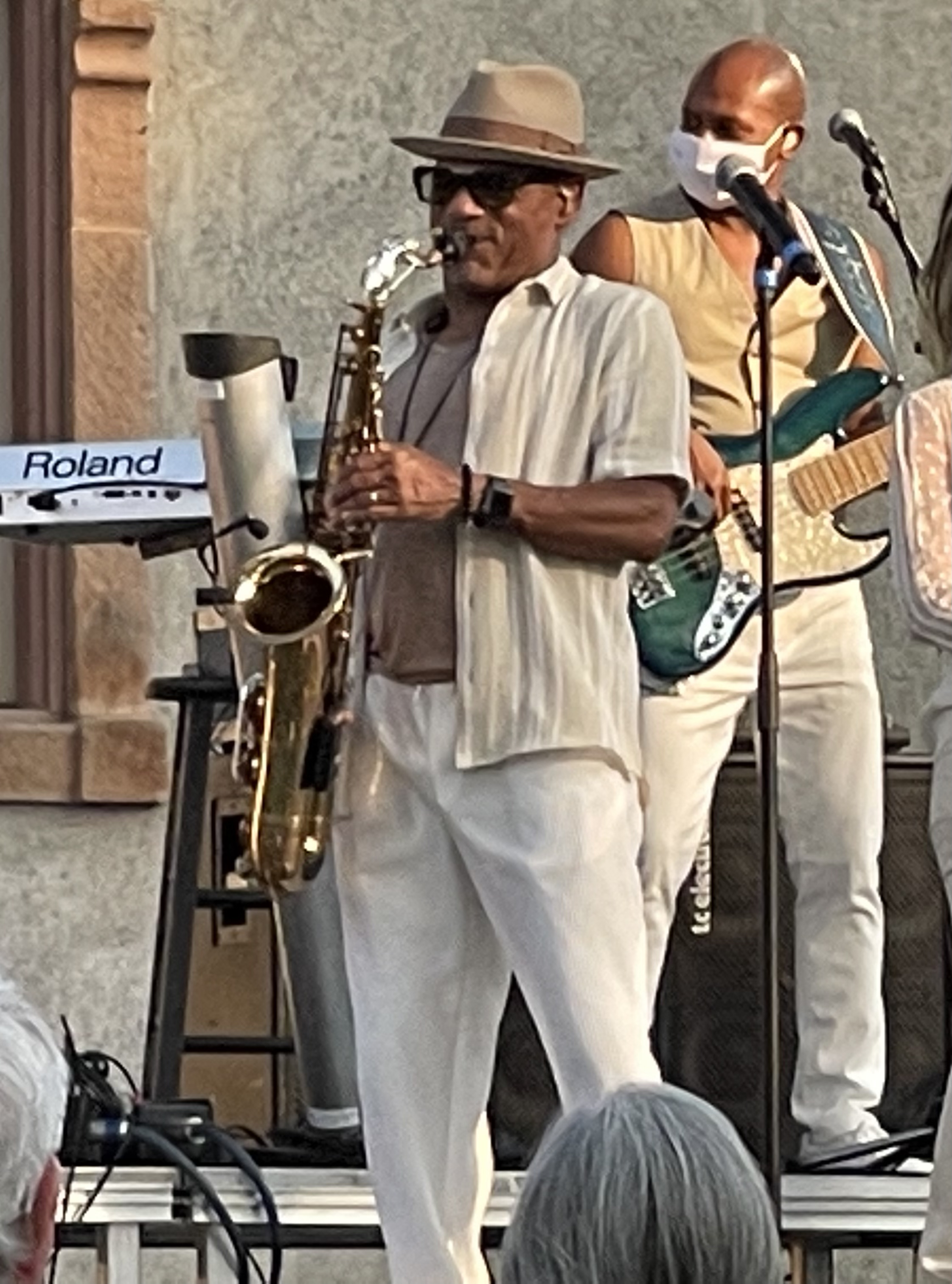
Whalum performing in St. Helena, California, in August 2021.

In 2005, Whalum recorded the Babyface Songbook (2005) with R&B icon Babyface's best songs of the past 15 years, including "Exhale (Shoop Shoop)", "I'll Make Love to You", "When Can I See You", and others. Joining in the intimate and stylish proceedings are other smooth jazz notables, including trumpeter Rick Braun, soprano saxophone player Dave Koz, and guitarists Norman Brown and Chuck Loeb among others. That same year, he performed a cover "Any Love" on the album Forever, For Always, For Luther, which included other smooth jazz greats, such as the Dave Koz, bassist Marcus Miller, tenor saxophonist Richard Elliot and alto saxophonist Mindi Abair covering Vandross's well-known songs. Whalum also contributed to the 2008 documentary film Miss HIV.

On June 20, 2014, Whalum was the inaugural Jazz Legend honoree of the National Museum of African American Music in Nashville, Tennessee. In September 2015, it was announced that Whalum would be joining the faculty of Visible Music College in Memphis, Tennessee. In September 2018, he was honored with a "Brass Note" on historic Beale Street's Walk of Fame in his native Memphis.

== Personal life ==
Whalum married his wife Rubystyne (Ruby) in 1980. They have four children, including musician and marathoner Kyle, as well as Courtney, Kori, and Evan. Whalum converted to Catholicism in 2022, after having served for years as a Protestant minister. He has also been a volunteer barber at a Catholic Worker house in Memphis. He is the uncle of saxophonist Kenneth Whalum.

== Discography ==
=== Studio albums ===
- Floppy Disk (1985)
- And You Know That (1988)
- The Promise (1989)
- Caché (1993)
- In This Life (1995)
- Joined at the Hip with Bob James (1996)
- Colors (1997)
- For You (1998)
- Unconditional (2000)
- Hymns in the Garden (2001)
- The Christmas Message (2001)
- Groovin with BWB (Braun, Whalum, Brown) (2002)
- Into My Soul (2003)
- Kirk Whalum Performs the Babyface Songbook (2005)
- Roundtrip (2007)
- Promises Made: The Millennium Promise Jazz Project (2008)
- Everything is Everything: The Music of Donny Hathaway (2010)
- More of Everything is Everything – ep (2010)
- Romance Language (2011)
- Human Nature with BWB (Braun, Whalum, Brown) (2013)
- bwb with BWB (Braun, Whalum, Brown) (2016)
- #Lovecovers (2017)
- Humanite (2019)
- How Does Christmas Sound? (2021)
- Epic Cool (2024)

=== The Gospel According to Jazz Series – Live ===
- The Gospel According to Jazz: Chapter I (1998)
- The Gospel According to Jazz: Chapter II (2002)
- The Gospel According to Jazz Chapter III (2010)
- The Gospel According to Jazz Chapter IV" (2014)

=== Live albums ===
- Live from the Detroit Jazz Festival 2013 (2014) - Released by the 'Mack Avenue SuperBand 2013'.

=== Compilation albums ===
- The Best of Kirk Whalum (2002)
- Ultimate Kirk Whalum (2007)

=== As sideman ===
With Joey DeFrancesco

- Where Were You? (Columbia, 1990)

With Faye Carol

- Faye Sings The Blues (Getdown Records, 2026)

=== Singles ===
- "Mad About the Wolf" from Simply Mad About the Mouse (1991)

=== Charted albums ===
Year	Album	Peak chart positions								Label
Year	Album	US 200	US Top Sales	US Jazz	US Con. Jazz	US R&B /HH	US Gos	US Top Cur	US Ind	Label
1988	And You Know That!	142	—	—	1	—	—	142	—	Columbia
1989	The Promise	—	—	—	7	—	—	—	—	Columbia
1993	Caché	—	—	39	1	42	—	—	—	Columbia
1995	In This Life	—	—	18	12	—	—	—	—	Columbia
1996	Joined at the Hip (Bob James and Kirk Whalum)	—	—	11	10	—	—	—	—	Warner Bros.
1997	Colors	—	—	13	10	—	—	—	—	Warner Bros.
1998	The Gospel According to Jazz: Chapter I	—	—	22	15	—	17	—	—	Warner Bros.
1998	For You	—	—	6	4	—	—	—	—	Warner Bros.
2000	Unconditional	—	—	3	2	86	—	—	—	Warner Bros.
2001	Hymns in the Garden	—	—	27	18	—	—	—	—	Warner Bros.
2001	The Christmas Message	—	—	27	14	—	—	—	—	Warner Bros.
2002	Groovin' (BWB)	—	—	6	4	—	—	—	—	Warner Bros.
2002	The Gospel According to Jazz: Chapter II	—	—	17	11	—	19	—	—	Warner Bros.
2003	Into My Soul	—	—	10	7	44	—	—	—	Warner Bros.
2005	Kirk Whalum Performs the Babyface Songbook	—	—	4	2	60	—	—	19	Rendezvous
2007	Roundtrip	—	—	4	2	—	—	—	30	Rendezvous
2008	Promises Made: The Millennium Promise Jazz Project	—	—	11	5	—	—	—	—	Koch
2010	The Gospel According to Jazz: Chapter III	—	—	4	2	—	11	—	—	Top Drawer
2010	Everything Is Everything: The Music of Donny Hathaway	—	—	4	3	41	—	—	—	Mack Avenue
2012	Romance Language	—	—	7	1	—	—	—	—	Rendezvous
2013	Human Nature (BWB)	184	184	4	2	—	—	151	—	Heads Up
2015	The Gospel According to Jazz: Chapter IV	—	—	6	1	—	7	—	—	Top Drawer
2016	bwb (BWB)	—	—	4	1	—	—	—	—	Artistry Music
2017	#Lovecovers	—	—	2	1	—	18	—	—	Top Drawer
2019	Times of Refreshing: Live at Eagle Mountain International Church (Stephen and Candy LaFlora featuring Kirk Whalum)	—	—	—	—	—	9	—	—	—N/a
2019	Humanité	—	—	10	4	—	—	—	—	Artistry Music
2024	Epic Cool	—	—	16	6	—	—	—	—	Artistry Music
"—" denotes a recording that did not chart.

=== Charted singles ===
Year	Title	Peak chart positions							Album
Year	Title	Hot R&B/ Hip-Hop Songs	Adult Cont.	R&B/ Hip-Hop Airplay	Smooth Jazz Airplay	Hot Gospel Songs	Adult R&B Airplay	Gospel Airplay	Album
1993	"Love Is a Losing Game" (Kirk Whalum featuring Jevetta Steele)	51	49	52	—N/a	—	—	—	Caché
1999	"All I Do"	—	—	—	—N/a	—	18	—	For You
2001	"Real Love" (Kirk Whalum featuring Wendy Moten)	—	—	—	—N/a	—	33	—	Unconditional
2002	"Can't Stop the Rain"	—	—	—	—N/a	—	35	—	Unconditional
2006	"Whip Appeal"	—	—	—	14	—	—	—	Kirk Whalum Performs the Babyface Songbook
2006	"I'll Make Love to You"	—	—	—	30	—	—	—	Kirk Whalum Performs the Babyface Songbook
2006	"Give Me the Reason"	—	—	—	1	—	—	—	Various Artists – Today's #1 Smooth Jazz Radio Hits!
2007	"The Wave" (2007)	—	—	—	21	—	—	—	Roundtrip
2009	"Juicy" (Brian Simpson featuring Kirk Whalum)	—	—	—	21	—	—	—	Brian Simpson – Above the Clouds
2010	"He's Been Just That Good" (Kirk Whalum featuring Lalah Hathaway)	—	—	—	—	21	—	21	The Gospel According to Jazz: Chapter III
2010	"Love, Love, Love" (Kirk Whalum featuring Rick Braun)	—	—	—	23	—	—	—	Everything Is Everything
2012	"Spend My Life with You"	—	—	—	14	—	—	—	Romance Language
2013	"Man in the Mirror" (bwb)	—	—	—	3	—	—	—	bwb – Human Nature
2014	"Shake Your Body (Down to the Ground)" (bwb)	—	—	—	1	—	—	—	bwb – Human Nature
2014	"Billie Jean" (bwb)	—	—	—	22	—	—	—	bwb – Human Nature
2015	"Sunday's Best"	—	—	—	22	—	—	—	The Gospel According to Jazz: Chapter IV
2015	"Swagster" (Jeff Golub featuring Philippe Saisse and Kirk Whalum)	—	—	—	1	—	—	—	Jeff Golub – The Vault
2016	"Trust God" (J. Moss featuring Kirk Whalum)	—	—	—	—	23	—	—	J. Moss – GFG Reload
2016	"bwb" (bwb)	—	—	—	1	—	—	—	bwb – BWB
2016	"Triple Dare" (bwb)	—	—	—	1	—	—	—	bwb – BWB
2017	"I Want You Girl" (bwb)	—	—	—	4	—	—	—	bwb – BWB
2017	"Go Home" (David Garfield featuring Kirk Whalum and Paul Jackson Jr.)	—	—	—	2	—	—	—	David Garfield – Jammin' - Outside the Box
2019	"Korogocho" (Kirk Whalum featuring Marcus Miller and Barry Likumahuwa)	—	—	—	5	—	—	—	Humanité
2020	"Kwetu" (Kirk Whalum featuring Ghetto Classics and Aaron Rimbui)	—	—	—	20	—	—	—	Humanité
2020	"SJL" (Kirk Whalum featuring Keiko Matsui)	—	—	—	22	—	—	—	Humanité
2022	"Journey to Love" (Nathan Mitchell featuring Kirk Whalum)	—	—	—	29	—	—	—	Nathan Mitchell – It's My Time
2024	"Bah-De-Yah!"	—	—	—	2	—	—	—	Epic Cool
2025	"Pillow Talk"	—	—	—	5	—	—	—	Epic Cool
2025	"Well Alright" (Kirk Whalum featuring Andrew Ford and Nick Mancini)	—	—	—	6	—	—	—	Epic Cool
2026	"Jolanda" (Greg Manning featuring Kirk Whalum)	—	—	—	1	—	—	—	Greg Manning – TBC
"—" denotes a recording that did not chart.
