= John Stoddart (singer) =

American R&B/gospel singer-songwriter

John Stoddart is an American R&B/gospel singer-songwriter. He grew up singing in church and began formal vocal training at age 13. In 1993, earned a Bachelor of Arts in Piano and Voice from Washington Adventist University in Takoma Park, Maryland. Stoddart has worked as songwriter on many other artists' albums and also on production and backing vocal levels. Stoddart sang backing vocals for I Surrender in Celine Dion's 2002 album A New Day Has Come. John now lives in Huntsville with 2 daughters Analiece and Noel.

== Discography ==
=== Studio albums ===
- Love So Real [1997 UJE Music]
- Wings to Walk on This Road (2003)
- Faces (2008)
- Faith Hope Love (2010)
- Only on Christmas Day (2013)
