= ImClone stock trading case =

SEC probe of Martha Stewart

A U.S. Securities and Exchange Commission and U.S. Attorney probe into trading in the shares of ImClone Systems resulted in a widely publicized criminal case, which resulted in prison terms for businesswoman and television personality Martha Stewart, ImClone CEO Samuel D. Waksal, and Stewart's broker at Merrill Lynch, Peter Bacanovic.

== History ==
ImClone's stock price dropped sharply at the end of 2001 when its drug Erbitux, an experimental monoclonal antibody, failed to get the expected Food and Drug Administration (FDA) approval. It was revealed by the U.S. Securities and Exchange Commission that before the announcement (after the close of trading on December 28) of the FDA's decision, numerous executives sold their stock. ImClone's founder, Samuel D. Waksal, was arrested in 2002 on insider trading charges for instructing friends and family to sell their stock, and attempting to sell his own. His daughter, Aliza Waksal, sold $2.5 million in shares on December 27. His father, Jack Waksal, sold $8.1 million in shares over the 27th and 28th; company executives followed suit. John B. Landes, the general counsel, sold $2.5 million in shares on December 6. Ronald A. Martell, the vice president for marketing and sales, sold $2.1 million in shares on December 11. Four other executives sold shares in the following weeks as well. Later, founder Waksal pleaded guilty to various charges, including securities fraud, and on June 10, 2003, was sentenced to seven years and three months in prison.

Martha Stewart, the founder of Martha Stewart Living Omnimedia, also became embroiled in the scandal after it emerged that her broker, Peter Bacanovic, tipped her off that ImClone was about to drop. In response, Stewart sold about $230,000 in ImClone shares on December 27, 2001, a day before the announcement of the FDA decision. Stewart's involvement would have never come to light had Doug Faneuil, Bacanovic's assistant, not disclosed it to investigators. Although Stewart maintained her innocence, she was found guilty and sentenced on July 16, 2004, to five months in prison, five months of home confinement, and two years' probation for lying about a stock sale, conspiracy, and obstruction of justice.

Ultimately a new clinical trial and FDA filing prepared by ImClone's partner Merck KGaA ("German Merck" not to be confused with the U.S. company of similar name) resulted in an FDA approval of Erbitux in 2004 for use in colon cancer.

A Congressional hearing on improprieties at ImClone, held in October 2002, unveiled a culture of corruption dating back to 1986. This was the year that ImClone CEO Waksal first forged the signature of the company's general counsel John Landes (one of the three original employees of the company) for financial gain. Nonetheless, Landes defended Waksal's illegal actions at the hearings before the Subcommittee on Oversight and Investigations, portraying the forgery as "a good-faith misunderstanding". The subcommittee's chairman, Jim Greenwood of Pennsylvania, replied, "My children know better than that, Mr. Landes." Further questioning about this and subsequent forgeries on Waksal's part revealed that neither Landes, the chief legal officer of the company, nor the company's outside directors reported Waksal's actions to proper authorities or made any moves to have Waksal removed as CEO. Instead, testimony revealed that they initiated their own internal investigation, which was never concluded.

The FDA's February 2004 announcement of approval for use of Erbitux for treatment of colorectal cancer reported that conclusions were drawn from a trial involving 329 patients, of which 10.8% responded when Erbitux was used by itself, delaying tumor growth by 1.5 months. When used in conjunction with a standard treatment irinotecan, 22.9% of patients responded and tumor growth was delayed by approximately 4.1 months.

In September 2001, Bristol Myers Squibb committed $2 billion (including a $1 billion up-front cash payment) for less than 20% of ImClone due to what was called at the time the drug's "blockbuster" potential.

In January 2006, the company was put up for sale but failed to find any buyers, likely because Erbitux by that time faced significant competition in the medical marketplace. ImClone directors withdrew the sale of the company in mid-2006.

In April 2009, Eli Lilly and Company purchased ImClone Systems Inc. for an estimated $6.8 billion.

== Indictment and SEC charges ==
Waksal was arrested June 12, 2002, on charges of conspiring to commit insider trading. On October 15, he pleaded guilty to charges of securities fraud, bank fraud, obstruction of justice, and perjury.

On March 3, 2003, he pleaded guilty to charges of conspiracy and wire fraud for avoiding $1.2 million in sales taxes on $15 million in artwork. The art included works by Mark Rothko, Richard Serra, Roy Lichtenstein, and Willem de Kooning, purchased between June 2000 and October 2001. He did not pay the necessary taxes at the time of purchase, but paid in fall 2002.

On June 10, 2003, Waksal was sentenced to seven years and three months in prison and ordered to pay more than $4 million in fines and back taxes, all the maximum punishments allowable under law. Waksal was released in 2009.

On June 4, 2003, a federal grand jury in Manhattan indicted Stewart and her former broker, Peter Bacanovic, on nine criminal counts. The government alleged that, by selling when she did, Stewart avoided losses of $45,673. The charges included securities fraud, obstruction of justice, and conspiracy. Stewart pleaded not guilty, saying she had a standing order with Bacanovic to sell her shares if ImClone stock fell below $60. Stewart resigned as CEO and chairman of Martha Stewart Living Omnimedia on the same day she was indicted, but remained on the company's board.

The day after her indictment, Stewart took out a full-page advertisement in USA Today and launched a website with an open letter of defense "to my friends and loyal supporters." She said, "I want you to know that I am innocent—and that I will fight to clear my name... The government's attempt to criminalize these actions makes no sense to me... I am confident I will be exonerated of these baseless charges."

On the day she was indicted, the U.S. Securities and Exchange Commission filed a civil complaint against Stewart with charges of insider trading (for violating §17(a) of the Securities Act of 1933, §10(b) of the Securities Exchange Act of 1934, and SEC Rule 10b-5). The civil charges were stayed pending the criminal proceeding.

== Trial ==
Stewart's trial was initially set for January 12, 2004, at the request of her lawyers who said they needed more time to analyze the evidence. The trial eventually began on January 20 in New York City presided over by U.S. District Judge Miriam Goldman Cedarbaum. During the trial, Stewart maintained her innocence.

On February 27, 2004, Judge Cederbaum dismissed the charge of securities fraud, which could have led to up to ten years in prison and a $1 million fine. The judge found that "no reasonable juror can find beyond a reasonable doubt that the defendant lied for the purpose of influencing the market for the securities of her own company."

=== Verdict ===
The jury deliberated for three days following the five-week trial. On March 5, 2004, Stewart was found guilty by the jury of eight women and four men on all four remaining counts: conspiracy, obstruction of justice, and two counts of making false statements to a federal investigator. She was found not guilty of one of the most publicized charges: having falsely claimed that there was an agreement to sell her shares when they fell to $60. The jury found that Stewart lied and obstructed justice on other grounds, including her claim that she was reminded of the prior $60 agreement and urged to sell on that basis.

Following the jury verdict, a message was posted on her website, reading, in part:

I am obviously distressed by the jury's verdict but I continue to take comfort in knowing that I have the confidence and enduring support of my family and friends. I will appeal the verdict and continue to fight to clear my name. I believe in the fairness of the judicial system and remain confident that I will ultimately prevail.

=== Sentencing ===
On July 8, a motion for a new trial was denied and sentencing was set for July 16. Stewart and Bacanovic were each sentenced to five months in prison, five months of home confinement, and two years' probation for lying about a stock sale, conspiracy, and obstruction of justice. Stewart was ordered to pay a $30,000 fine, while Bacanovic was fined $4,000. The judge stayed the sentence while they prepared their appeals.

On September 15, 2004, accompanied by her lawyers and members of the board of directors of Martha Stewart Living Omnimedia, Stewart held a press conference to announce her decision to begin serving her sentence as soon as possible while vowing to continue ahead with her appeal. The event was featured live on national television. On September 21, Judge Miriam Cedarbaum ordered her to surrender by October 8. On September 29, the Federal Bureau of Prisons announced that Stewart would serve her sentence at the federal prison camp near Alderson, West Virginia, denying her request to serve it at the federal prison in Danbury, Connecticut. She reported to Alderson Federal Prison Camp early in the morning on October 8. Alderson is a minimum security prison, the lowest level of security in the Bureau of Prisons. There are no fences, and inmates are generally free to walk around the compound unescorted. Stewart, who said her prison nickname was "M. Diddy", reportedly got along quite well with her fellow inmates and kept herself busy with assigned cleaning tasks. She was released on March 4, 2005.

After being released from Alderson, Stewart began her home confinement at her estate in Bedford, New York. During the confinement, she was permitted to leave her property for up to 48 hours a week to conduct business, but was required to wear an electronic ankle monitor to monitor her location at all times. On January 6, 2006, a Federal Appeals court denied Stewart's appeal and upheld the jury's verdict.

== Repercussions and aftermath ==
On March 8, 2004, Viacom pulled Martha Stewart Living from its CBS and UPN affiliates, after having moved the show during Stewart's trial from prime daytime timeslots into less desirable early-morning slots (e.g., 2:05 am in New York); the show was distributed by another Viacom division, King World Productions. On March 15, Stewart resigned from the board of Martha Stewart Living Omnimedia. Stewart had already resigned from the boards of The New York Stock Exchange and Revlon Cosmetics. On May 18, MSO announced that Martha Stewart Living, was going into hiatus, with no announced date of return.

On May 21, 2004, Larry Stewart (no relation), a United States Secret Service lab director who testified for the government against Martha Stewart, was charged with two counts of perjury. Stock in Martha Stewart Living Omnimedia jumped as much as 23 percent on the news. Larry Stewart was an expert witness about the ink on a broker's worksheet, testifying that the note about selling ImClone shares when it dropped below $60 was different from the rest of the ink on the document. The charges arose when Susan Fortunato, a Secret Service co-worker, complained that she had in fact done the analysis and that it had never been examined by Stewart. Although the jury at the perjury trial felt that Larry Stewart had taken unfair credit for the work done, it did not amount to perjury and he was found not guilty on October 5, 2004. The jury had trouble believing Fortunato, feeling that she had an axe to grind with Stewart.

In October 2005, Stewart was informed that due to her status as a convicted felon in the United States, she was inadmissible for entry into Canada under the Immigration and Refugee Protection Act. Stewart had planned to attend the Windsor Pumpkin Regatta in Nova Scotia. Within two days of the story's breaking, then Canadian Minister of Citizenship and Immigration Joe Volpe granted Stewart a temporary resident permit, thereby allowing her to temporarily enter Canada. Bad weather prevented her from attending, however.

In June 2008, the UK Border Agency, operational since April 1, 2008, with new rules to safeguard British borders, refused to grant her a visa to enter the United Kingdom, because of her criminal conviction for obstructing justice. She had been planning to speak at the Royal Academy on fashion and leisure industry matters.

In August 2006, the Securities and Exchange Commission announced that it had agreed to settle the related civil case against Stewart. Under the settlement, Stewart agreed to a five-year bar from serving as a director, or as the CEO, CFO (or other officer roles in which she would be responsible for preparing, auditing, or disclosing financial results), of any public company. She also agreed to pay the maximum penalty of three times the losses she avoided, or $195,000. Bacanovic agreed to pay penalties totaling about $75,000, and was barred associating with a broker, dealer or investment adviser.

=== TV movies ===
Martha: Behind Bars, based on her time in prison, starred Cybill Shepherd as Stewart and was aired by CBS in September 2005. A previous movie, Martha, Inc.: The Story of Martha Stewart, also starring Shepherd, had been aired by NBC in 2003.
