= Kadmon Corporation =

Biopharmeceutical company based in New York City

Kadmon Corporation, LLC.
- Type: Subsidiary
- Traded as: Nasdaq: KDMN; NYSE: KDMN
- Industry: Biotechnology
- Founded: 2009; 17 years ago
- Founder: Samuel D. Waksal
- Headquarters: 450 East 29th Street, New York, NY 10016, United States
- Number of locations: 4
- Key people: Harlan W. Waksal, MD (CEO); Anastasios G. Konidaris (Interim chairman)
- Products: capecitabine, dofetilide, entecavir, ribavirin, temozolomide, tetrabenazine, tobramycin
- Number of employees: 101
- Parent: Sanofi
- Website: kadmon.com

Kadmon Corporation (originally Kadmon Pharmaceuticals) is a biopharmaceutical company based in New York City. It also has operations in Warrendale, PA and Brighton, MA. The company was founded in 2009 by Samuel D. Waksal, founder and former CEO of ImClone Systems, a company now fully merged into Eli Lilly. Waksal had served a federal prison sentence stemming from his fiduciary role as CEO in the 2001 ImClone stock trading case. When released in 2009 he was barred from serving as an officer for any publicly traded company but Kadmon was privately financed.

In September 2014, amid plans to take the company to an IPO Harlan W. Waksal, brother of Samuel Waksal, became President and Chief Executive Officer while Samuel Waksal remained on with the title Chief of Innovation, Science and Strategy. In early 2016 Sam Waksal left Kadmon and in June the company filed paperwork for its IPO. On July 27, 2016 the company's stock began trading on the NYSE under the symbol KDMN but switched to NASDAQ in October 2020. On 8 September 2021, Sanofi announced it would acquire the company for $1.9 billion. The deal completed in November and its stock was deregistered as it became a subsidiary of Sanofi.

As of 2019 Kadmon had ongoing clinical trials for Belumosudil in specific fibrotic and neurodegenerative diseases and tesevatinib to treat autosomal dominant polycystic kidney disease (PKD) and autosomal recessive PKD.

== Product acquisitions ==
During Waksal's leadership of ImClone the company was engaged in early stage research projects for 15 years before filing its first drug application. Kadmon however immediately began acquiring drugs further advanced - either already marketed in the US or in the later stages of clinical development. It acquired the Warrendale, PA-based company Three Rivers Pharmaceuticals and their Ribasphere and topotecan products. It also signed an agreement with Ontario, Canada-based Valeant Pharmaceuticals for their Hepatitis C drugs ribavirin and taribavirin (now KD024). Cancer drugs XL647 and XL844 were acquired from Exelixis. An inhibitor of several protein kinases, tesevatinib (XL647, KD019) entered Phase II clinical trial for certain indications of non-small cell lung cancer. and in polycystic kidney disease. XL844 is an inhibitor of protein kinases Chk1 and Chk2 and may increase the sensitivity of cancer cells to radiation therapy.

In an acquisition atypical for a biotechnology company, an 1800-year-old Chinese herbal formula was added to Kadmon's portfolio. PhytoCeutica's PHY906 (KD018) is a formula of four botanical products that had long been used for the treatment of gastrointestinal distress. Preclinical studies have shown it to enhance the therapeutic activity of several anticancer agents. In 2014 KD018 was in a Phase II trial in combination with irinotecan in metastatic colon cancer.

In 2011 the company acquired rights from Brighton, MA-based Nano Terra Inc. for their Pharmacomer Technology research platform and three drug candidates in clinical development. These compounds include SLx-2119 (KD025), an inhibitor to Rho kinase 2 (ROCK2) with possible potential in fibrotic disease and focal cerebral ischemia. SLx-4090 (KD026) is a triglyceride transfer protein (MTP) inhibitor being explored for metabolic disorders. SLx-2101 (KD027) is a phosphodiesterase 5 (PDE5) inhibitor, a class of drug used in the treatment of erectile dysfunction.

In 2012 the rights to salirasib (KD032), a Ras antagonist in development for cancer therapy, were acquired from Concordia Pharmaceuticals of Fort Lauderdale, FL. It also acquired the rights from Burlington, MA-based Dyax Corp. for DX-2400, a Matrix metalloproteinase-14 (MPP-14) targeted monoclonal antibody intended to inhibit tumor blood vessel formation and metastasis.

== Products ==
As of 2019 Kadmon produces several generic drugs approved by the Food and Drug Administration in the United States.

- Capecitabine tablets, a nucleoside metabolic inhibitor for the treatment of colon and breast cancer
- Dofetilide capsules, a cardiac antiarrhythmic drug.
- Entecavir tablets, a virus nucleoside analog reverse transcriptase inhibitor indicated for the treatment of chronic hepatitis B virus infection.
- Ribavirin for the treatment of chronic hepatitis C
- Temozolomide capsules, an alkylating drug for the treatment of glioblastoma multiforme and astrocytoma.
- Tetrabenazine tablets, a vesicular monoamine transporter 2 inhibitor indicated for the treatment of Huntington's disease.
- Tobramycin, as an inhalation nebulizer solution for the treatment of cyctic fibrosis.
