= Moonlighting (theme song) =

Theme song by Al Jarreau

Single by Al Jarreau

from the album Moonlighting: the Television Soundtrack Album
- Released: 1987
- Genre: Pop, smooth jazz
- Length: 3:00
- Label: MCA Records
- Songwriters: Lee Holdridge, Al Jarreau
- Producer: Nile Rodgers

Audio
- "Moonlighting – Al Jarreau" on YouTube

"Moonlighting" is the theme song to the ABC comedy-crime drama of the same name, which ran from 1985 to 1989 and starred Bruce Willis and Cybill Shepherd. The theme song was performed by Al Jarreau, who wrote the song with Lee Holdridge. Jarreau recorded two complete recordings of the song, both of which were used for the series.

The complete version of the original recording is only heard during the end credits of the pilot episode. A short edit of this recording was used for the opening credits in Seasons 1–3, where only the first verse and final "who just met on the way..." are heard. A different short edit was used for the end credits.

The second recording, used from Season 4 onwards, was recorded and produced by Nile Rodgers in 1986 as part of the sessions for Jarreau's album L Is for Lover; however, it was not included on that album, a decision that Rodgers later regretted. This recording, which is performed in a slightly slower tempo and a subtly different arrangement to the earlier recording, is the more familiar of the two, since it was released as a single in 1987. It reached number 23 on the Billboard Hot 100 and spent one week at number one on the Adult Contemporary chart, and was included on the soundtrack album for the series. The second recording was also included on Jarreau's 1996 compilation album The Best of Al Jarreau, as well as on the 2011 reissue of L Is for Lover. As with the first 3 seasons, shorter edits of the recording were used for the opening and closing credits. There were two versions of this song. One has a saxophone and the other has a harmonica.

== Charts ==
Weekly chart performance for "Moonlighting" by Al Jarreau
| Chart (1987) | Peak position |
|---|---|
| Australia (Kent Music Report) | 64 |
| Canada Adult Contemporary (RPM) | 1 |
| Canada Top Singles (RPM) | 38 |
| Europe (European Hot 100 Singles) | 42 |
| Ireland (IRMA) | 7 |
| New Zealand (Recorded Music NZ) | 36 |
| UK Singles (Official Charts) | 8 |
| US Billboard Hot 100 | 23 |
| US Adult Contemporary (Billboard) | 1 |

== Awards ==
- In 1988 the song earned two Grammy Award nominations for Best Pop Vocal Performance, Male and for Best Song Written Specifically for a Motion Picture or Television.

== Track listing ==
1. Moonlighting "Theme" (Extended Remix) – Al Jarreau, Lee Holdridge – 4:17
2. Moonlighting "Theme" (7" Version) – Al Jarreau, Lee Holdridge – 3:01
3. Golden Girl – Jimmy Felber – 5:50
