= Being Rose =

- Directed by: Rod McCall
- Written by: Rod McCall
- Produced by: Greg Clonts; J. Todd Harris; Eric Williams
- Starring: Cybill Shepherd; James Brolin; Pam Grier
- Cinematography: Colemar Nichols
- Edited by: Stephen Griffin
- Music by: Brian Ralston
- Production company: Tesoro Pictures
- Distributed by: Gravitas Ventures
- Release dates: November 9, 2017 (Lone Star Film Festival); January 4, 2019
- Running time: 89 minutes
- Country: United States
- Language: English

Being Rose is a 2017 American drama film by director Rod McCall about a dying woman who finds love while soul searching throughout the southwest during her final days. The film was released nationwide and on VOD by Gravitas Ventures on January 4, 2019.

== Plot ==
After being diagnosed with serious health issues, ex-cop Rose Jones (Cybill Shepherd), goes on a road trip in a wheelchair to search for her estranged son Will (Erik Fellows). The journey is punctuated with stays at health spas. Along the way, she falls in love with Max (James Brolin), a handsome old cowboy, who has come to a crossroads of his own. However she returns home to spend her final weeks with her female friends. Max comes to see her and tries to take her to his ranch but she refuses to go.

== Cast ==
- Cybill Shepherd as Rose
- James Brolin as Max
- Pam Grier as Lily
- Amy Davidson as Ashley
- Julio Cedillo as Ernesto
- Cindy Pickett as karen
- Erik Fellows as Will

== Film Festivals ==
Being Rose was selected to world premiere as the opening night feature in the Lone Star Film Festival in Fort Worth Texas, November 7, 2017.

== Release ==
Gravitas Ventures gave the film a limited release on January 4, 2019. It was released via video on demand on the same day.
