= Christopher M. Byron =

American financial writer

Christopher M. Byron (December 27, 1944 – 2017) was an American financial writer. From 1995 to 2001, he wrote a financial column for The New York Observer. He later was a columnist at the New York Post until 2006.

Byron's 2002 book Martha Inc. was adapted into the 2003 television film Martha, Inc.: The Story of Martha Stewart.

== Books ==
- The Fanciest Dive: What Happened When the Giant Media Empire of Time/Life Leaped Without Looking Into the Age of High-Tech (1986)
- Skin Tight: The Bizarre Story of Guess v. Jordache (1996)
- Martha Inc.: The Incredible Story of Martha Stewart Living Omnimedia (2002)
