= Lee Holdridge =

American composer, conductor, and orchestrator

- Born: Lee Elwood Holdridge; March 3, 1944 (age 82); Port-au-Prince, Haiti
- Occupations: Composer; Conductor; Orchestrator
- Spouse: Elisa Justice
- Father: Leslie Holdridge
- Website: www.leeholdridge.com

Lee Elwood Holdridge (born March 3, 1944) is an American composer, conductor, and orchestrator. An 18-time Emmy Award nominee, he has won two Primetime Emmy Awards, two Daytime Emmy Awards, two News and Documentary Emmy Awards, and one Sports Emmy Award. He has also been nominated for two Grammy Awards.

== Life and career ==
Holdridge was born in Port-au-Prince, Haiti, of a Puerto Rican mother and an American father, Leslie Holdridge, a botanist and climatologist.

While living in Costa Rica, at age ten, he studied the violin with Hugo Mariani, who was at the time the conductor of the National Symphony Orchestra of Costa Rica. He then moved to Boston, where he finished high school and studied composition with Henry Lasker. Later in New York he had numerous study consultations with composer Nicolas Flagello as well as composer-lyricist Stephen Sondheim.

The move to New York City enabled Holdridge to continue his music studies and begin his career as a professional composer. There, he composed chamber works, rock pieces, songs, theater music and background scores for short films, and eventually came to Neil Diamond's notice. Diamond then brought Holdridge with him to Los Angeles to write arrangements for his forthcoming albums. After several gold and platinum hits, the two collaborated on the Grammy Award winning score for producer/director Hall Bartlett's film adaptation of Jonathan Livingston Seagull. Neil Diamond sued Bartlett for cutting much of his music from the film. Diamond was also against sharing musical credit with Holdridge; however, the Academy of Motion Picture Arts & Sciences ruled in Holdridge's favor. Bartlett was ordered to reinstate the five minutes of Diamond's music score and three of his songs, "Anthem", "Prologue", and "Dear Father", and that the onscreen credits were to state "Music and songs by Neil Diamond", "Background score composed and adapted by Neil Diamond and Lee Holdridge", and "Music supervision by Tom Catalano".

Holdridge has composed and orchestrated for many films, including:

- Jeremy (1973)
- Forever Young, Forever Free (1975)
- Mustang Country (1976)
- The Pack (1977)
- The Other Side of the Mountain Part 2 (1978)
- Like Mom, Like Me (1978)
- Moment by Moment (1978)
- Tilt (1979)
- French Postcards (1979)
- American Pop (1981)
- The Day the Loving Stopped (1981)
- The Beastmaster (1982)
- Mr. Mom (1983)
- Splash (1984)
- Micki & Maude (1984)
- Transylvania 6-5000 (1985)
- The Men's Club (1986)
- A Tiger's Tale (1987)
- Big Business (1988)
- Old Gringo (1989)
- The Adventures of Pinocchio (1996)
- Into Thin Air: Death on Everest (1997)
- The Secret of NIMH 2: Timmy to the Rescue (1998)
- Into the Arms of Strangers: Stories of the Kindertransport (2000)
- Puerto Vallarta Squeeze (2004)
- Brothers at War (2009).
- It Is No Dream (2012)
- Brothers After War (2023)

He composed for several television series, including:

- Sara
- East of Eden
- Eight is Enough
- I'll Take Manhattan
- Atomic Train
- The Mists of Avalon
- American Family
- The Brooke Ellison Story
- Moonlighting
- Beauty and the Beast
- 10.5
- When Calls the Heart

== Concert works ==
Holdridge has composed numerous concert works including:

- Concerto No. 3 for Violin and Orchestra
- Fantasy Chorale for Orchestra and Chorus
- Concertino for Guitar and Orchestra
- Scenes of Summer
- Two Lyric Pieces for Solo Violin, Strings and Harp
- Ode to Orion
- The Golden Land
- Jefferson Tribute, for narrator and orchestra.
- Lazarus and His Beloved, opera and orchestral suite.
- Concerto for Violin and Orchestra No. 2
- Concerto for Viola and Chamber Orchestra
- Concertino for Violoncello and Strings
- Serenade for Oboe and Strings
- Ballet Fantasy for Strings and Harp
- Elegy for Harp and Strings
- Hymns Triumphant 1 and 2, suites for chorus and orchestra.
- Sonnet for soprano and chamber orchestra.
- Dulce Rosa an opera based on an Isabel Allende short story, premiered in 2013.
- Trinity for the Joffrey Ballet co-authored with Alan Raph.
- Journey to Cordoba, Concierto Para Mendez and Tanis in America, one act operas.

== Personal life ==
Holdridge is married to ex-ballet dancer Elisa Justice. She is western region audition co-director of the Metropolitan Opera National Council. She also has hosted her own classical music radio show called "Eclectic Classics" and has co-produced a new album and documentary with Milt Okun called Great Voices Sing John Denver. She won a "Best Producer" award for a documentary at the Madrid International Film Festival.

== Awards and nominations ==
=== ASCAP Film and Television Music Awards ===
Year	Category	Nominated work	Result	Ref.
1988	Top TV Series	Moonlighting	Won	
2015	Top Television Series	When Calls the Heart	Won	

=== CableACE Awards ===
Year	Category	Nominated work	Results	Ref.
1988	Original Score	16 Days of Glory	Nominated	
1989	Original Score	A Friendship in Vienna	Nominated	
1994	Original Score	Heidi	Nominated	

=== Emmy Awards ===
Year	Category	Nominated work	Results	Ref.
Primetime Emmy Awards
1985	Outstanding Achievement in Music and Lyrics	"Moonlighting" (from Moonlighting)	Nominated	
1988	Outstanding Achievement in Main Title Theme Music	Beauty and the Beast	Nominated	
1988	Outstanding Achievement in Music Composition for a Series (Dramatic Underscore)	Beauty and the Beast (Episode: "Once Upon a Time in the City of New York")	Won	
1989	Outstanding Achievement in Music and Lyrics	"The First Time I Loved Forever" (from Beauty and the Beast: A Distant Shore)	Won	
1990	Outstanding Music Composition for a Miniseries or a Special (Dramatic Underscore)	Do You Know the Muffin Man?	Nominated	
1991	Outstanding Achievement in Main Title Theme Music	ABC World of Discovery	Nominated	
1993	Outstanding Individual Achievement in Main Title Theme Music	Bob	Nominated	
1993	Outstanding Individual Achievement in Music Composition for a Miniseries or a Special (Dramatic Underscore)	Call of the Wild	Nominated	
1995	Outstanding Individual Achievement in Music Composition for a Miniseries or a Special (Dramatic Underscore)	Buffalo Girls (for "Part 1")	Nominated	
1996	Outstanding Music Composition for a Miniseries or a Special	The Tuskegee Airmen	Nominated	
1999	Outstanding Music Composition for a Miniseries or a Movie (Dramatic Underscore)	Mutiny	Nominated	
2002	Outstanding Music Composition for a Miniseries, Movie or a Special (Dramatic Underscore)	The Mists of Avalon (for "Part 1")	Nominated	
Daytime Emmy Awards
1984	Special Classification of Outstanding Individual Achievement – Music	Woman to Woman	Nominated	
2000	Outstanding Achievement in Music Direction and Composition for a Drama Series	One Life to Live	Won	
2002	Outstanding Achievement in Music Direction and Composition for a Drama Series	One Life to Live	Nominated	
2004	Outstanding Achievement in Music Direction and Composition for a Drama Series	One Life to Live	Nominated	
2005	Outstanding Music Direction and Composition for a Drama Series	One Life to Live	Won	
2006	Outstanding Achievement in Music Direction and Composition for a Drama Series	One Life to Live	Nominated	
2007	Outstanding Achievement in Music Direction and Composition for a Drama Series	One Life to Live	Nominated	
2008	Outstanding Achievement in Music Direction and Composition for a Drama Series	One Life to Live	Nominated	
2010	Outstanding Achievement in Music Direction and Composition for a Drama Series	One Life to Live	Nominated	
2012	Outstanding Achievement in Music Direction and Composition for a Drama Series	One Life to Live	Nominated	
Sports Emmy Awards
1998	Outstanding Achievement in a Craft: Music Composition/Direction/Lyrics	Atlanta's Olympic Glory	Won	
News and Documentary Emmy Awards
1988	Outstanding Achievement in a Craft in News and Documentary Programming – Music	The Explorers: A Century of Discovery	Won	
1991	Outstanding Individual Achievement in a Craft: Music Composition	ABC World of Discovery (for "Beautiful Killers")	Won	

=== Grammy Awards ===
Year	Category	Nominated work	Results	Ref.
1973	Best Instrumental Arrangement	"Prologue/Crunchy Granola Suite"	Nominated	
1987	Best Song Written Specifically for a Motion Picture or for Television	"Moonlighting" (from Moonlighting: The Television Soundtrack Album)	Nominated	

=== International Film Music Critics Association Awards ===
Year	Category	Nominated work	Result	Ref.
2009	Best Original Score for a Documentary Feature	Brothers at War	Nominated	

=== Online Film & Television Association Awards ===
Year	Category	Nominated work	Result	Ref.
2002	Best Music in a Motion Picture or Miniseries	The Mists of Avalon	Nominated	
