= Moonlighting (TV series) =

American comedy-drama television series (1985–1989)

- Genre: Comedy drama; Mystery; Romance
- Created by: Glenn Gordon Caron
- Starring: Cybill Shepherd; Bruce Willis; Allyce Beasley; Curtis Armstrong
- Theme music composer: Lee Holdridge; Al Jarreau
- Opening theme: "Moonlighting", performed by Al Jarreau
- Composer: Alf Clausen
- Country of origin: United States
- Original language: English
- No. of seasons: 5
- No. of episodes: 67 (list of episodes)

Production
- Executive producer: Glenn Gordon Caron
- Running time: 45–49 minutes
- Production companies: Picturemaker Productions; ABC Circle Films

Original release
- Network: ABC
- Release: March 3, 1985 – May 14, 1989

Moonlighting is an American comedy drama television series that aired on ABC from March 3, 1985, to May 14, 1989. The network aired a total of 67 episodes. Starring Cybill Shepherd and Bruce Willis as private detectives, Allyce Beasley as their quirky receptionist, and Curtis Armstrong as a temporary worker (and later junior detective), the show was a mixture of drama, comedy, mystery, and romance, and was considered to be one of the first successful and influential examples of comedy drama, or "dramedy", emerging as a distinct television genre.

The show's theme song was co-written and performed by singer Al Jarreau and became a hit. The show is also credited with making Willis a star and relaunching Shepherd's career after a string of lackluster projects. In 1997, the episode "The Dream Sequence Always Rings Twice" was ranked number 34 on TV Guide's 100 Greatest Episodes of All Time. In 2007, the series was listed as one of Time magazine's "100 Best TV Shows of All-Time". The relationship between the characters David and Maddie was included in TV Guide's list of the best TV couples of all time.

== Plot ==
The series revolved around cases investigated by the Blue Moon Detective Agency and its two partners, Madolyn "Maddie" Hayes (Shepherd) and David Addison (Willis). The show, with a mix of mystery, sharp dialogue, and sexual tension between its leads, introduced Willis to the world and brought Shepherd back into the spotlight after a nearly decade-long absence. The characters were introduced in a two-hour pilot episode.

The show's storyline begins with the reversal of fortune of Maddie Hayes, a former model who finds herself bankrupt after her accountant steals all her liquid assets. She is left with several failing businesses formerly maintained as tax writeoffs, one of which is the City of Angels Detective Agency, helmed by the carefree David Addison. Between the pilot and the first one-hour episode, David persuades Maddie to keep the business and run it as a partnership. The agency is renamed Blue Moon Investigations because Maddie was most famous for being the spokesmodel for the Blue Moon Shampoo Company. In many episodes, she was recognized as "the Blue Moon shampoo girl", if not by name.

In his audio commentary for the season-three DVD, creator Glenn Gordon Caron says that the inspiration for the series was a production of The Taming of the Shrew he saw in Central Park starring Meryl Streep and Raúl Julia. The show parodied the play in the season-three episode "Atomic Shakespeare".

== Cast ==
=== Main cast ===
- Cybill Shepherd as Madolyn "Maddie" Hayes, is a chic, smart former high-fashion model. Left bankrupt when her accountant embezzles her money, she is forced to make a living by running the detective agency she owns as a tax writeoff. Using her celebrity as a former model, she brings in clients and tries to bring some order to a business previously run without any discipline. By the time he had written 50 pages for the pilot to the show, Caron says he realized he was writing the part for Shepherd. After reading the script, she immediately realized this was a part she wanted to do, and during her first meeting with Caron and producer Jay Daniel, remarked that it was reminiscent of a "Hawksian" comedy. The two had no idea what she was talking about, so she suggested they screen Twentieth Century, Bringing Up Baby, and His Girl Friday, three of her favorites, to see how the overlapping dialogue was handled. A week before shooting of the pilot began, Caron, Shepherd, and Willis watched Bringing Up Baby and His Girl Friday.
- Bruce Willis as David Addison, is a wisecracking detective running the City of Angels Detective Agency. Faced with the prospect of being put out of business, he convinces Maddie that they lost money only because they were supposed to and talks her into rebranding the agency and going into business with him as her partner. Caron had to fight with ABC to put Willis in the lead role, having already signed Shepherd for the pilot and series. Caron claims he tested Willis about a third of the way through over 2,000 actors, knew "this was the guy" immediately, and had to fight through twice as many more acting tests and readings, while arguing with ABC executives before receiving conditional authorization to cast Willis in the pilot. According to Caron, ABC did not feel that viewers would find any sexual tension between Shepherd and Willis believable.
- Allyce Beasley as Agnes DiPesto, is the agency's extremely loyal and quirky receptionist, who always answers the phone in rhyme. As problems arose with getting Willis and Shepherd on screen due to personal issues, the writers started to focus on the relationship between Agnes and fellow Blue Moon employee Herbert Viola. In the series finale, Agnes marries Herbert and berates Maddie and David for not being able to figure out their relationship as the entire set is dismantled, and says, "if there's a God in heaven, he'll spin Herbert and me off in our own series."
- Curtis Armstrong as Herbert Viola, started at Blue Moon as an employee from a temporary help agency. The producers brought Armstrong in based on his work in Revenge of the Nerds and Better Off Dead, hoping to expand the role of DiPesto by giving her a love interest, thereby taking some of the pressure off Willis and Shepherd. As Herbert begins to shine in his duties, he gets promoted to junior detective and marries Agnes in the series finale. Debuting in season three, he appeared in 36 of the series' 67 episodes.

=== Recurring ===
- Brooke Adams appeared in season four as Terri Knowles, a single mother for whom David volunteered as a Lamaze partner in preparation for the birth of Maddie's child.
- Jack Blessing as MacGillicudy, a Blue Moon employee, he became a foil for Viola and a rival for DiPesto's affections. Debuting in season three, he appeared in 17 episodes.
- Dennis Dugan as Walter Bishop, dates then marries Maddie.
- Mark Harmon appeared near the end of season three as Sam Crawford, Maddie's romantic interest and a rival of David's.
- Virginia Madsen appeared in season five as Annie Charnock, Maddie's cousin and a short-term romantic interest for David.
- Charles Rocket as Richard Addison, David's brother
- Eva Marie Saint and Robert Webber as Virginia and Alexander Hayes, Maddie's parents

=== Guest ===
- Barbara Bain as Emily Grayson, was in the season-two episode "My Fair David".
- Billy Barty appeared as himself in the season-two episode "Camille".
- Rona Barrett also was herself in "The Straight Poop".
- Richard Belzer portrayed Leonard in the season-two episode "Twas the Episode Before Christmas".
- Sandahl Bergman also appeared in "Big Man On Mulberry Street" in a "dream" dance sequence.
- Peter Bogdanovich appeared as himself in "The Straight Poop".
- Pierce Brosnan portrayed Remington Steele in the season-three episode "The Straight Poop".
- Dr. Joyce Brothers was herself in the season-four episode "A Trip to the Moon".
- K Callan was Carolyn Kandinsky in the season-two episode "In God We Strongly Suspect".
- Ray Charles also appeared in a "A Trip to the Moon" as himself.
- Imogene Coca was Clara DiPesto in the season-four episode "Los Dos DiPestos".
- Randall 'Tex' Cobb was the "Big Guy in Gas Station" in "Sam & Dave".
- Gary Cole as Alan McClafferty in the season-three episode "Maddie's Turn to Cry".
- Dana Delany as Jillian Armstrong, appeared in the season-two episode "Knowing Her".
- Colleen Dewhurst was Betty Russell in the season-five episode "Take My Wife, For Example".
- Donna Dixon acted as Joan Tenowitz in the season-three episode "Blonde on Blonde".
- Rick Ducommun portrayed one of David's friends in the season-three episode.
- Brad Dourif was Father McDonovan in the season-three episode "All Creatures Great and... Not So Great".
- Robert Ellenstein was Heinz in the pilot episode.
- Bill Erwin as Duncan Kennedy, appeared in the season-five episode "Perfetc".
- Mary Hart appeared as herself in the pilot episode.
- Sterling Holloway was the narrator in the "Atomic Shakespeare".
- C. Thomas Howell was a waiter (uncredited) in the season-two episode "The Lady in the Iron Mask", and as a postal worker (uncredited) in the season-three episode "Yours, Very Deadly".
- Whoopi Goldberg was Camille Brand in the season-two episode "Camille".
- John Goodman was Donald Chase in the season-four episode "Come Back Little Shiksa".
- William Hickey portrayed Mr. Kendall in the season-three episode "To Heiress Human".
- Jeff Jarvis appeared as himself in the season-three episode "Sam & Dave".
- Michelle Johnson portrayed Mrs. Hunziger in the season-five episode "Plastic Fantastic Lovers".
- David Patrick Kelly was McBride in the season-two episode "Somewhere Under the Rainbow".
- Don King also appeared in "Symphony in Knocked Flat" as himself.
- Dan Lauria was the lieutenant in the season-two episode "Portrait of Maddie".
- Timothy Leary appeared as minister Wynn Deaupayne in the season-five episode "Lunar Eclipse".
- Mark Linn-Baker as Phil West, appeared in the season-two episode "Atlas Belched".
- Colm Meaney was one of Katharina's suitors in the season-three episode "Atomic Shakespeare".
- Sam McMurray as Moe Hyman, also appeared in "Blonde on Blonde".
- Demi Moore, Bruce Willis's wife at the time, was the woman in the elevator in the season-five episode "When Girls Collide".
- Judd Nelson also appeared in "Camille" as a police officer.
- Terry O'Quinn appeared as Bryant "Brian" Wilbourne also in "Take a Left at the Altar".
- Amanda Plummer was Jacqueline "Jackie" Wilbourne in the season-four episode "Take a Left at the Altar".
- Tim Robbins was a hitman in the season-one episode "Gunfight at the So-So Corral".
- Liz Sheridan was Selma in the pilot episode.
- Lionel Stander appeared as Max in the season-three episode "It's a Wonderful Job".
- Paul Sorvino was David Addison, Sr., in the season-three episode "The Son Also Rises".
- The Temptations appeared as themselves in the season-three episode "Symphony in Knocked Flat".
- Cheryl Tiegs was herself in "It's a Wonderful Job".
- Jennifer Tilly acted as Nurse Saundra in the season-five episode "Plastic Fantastic Lovers".
- Orson Welles appeared as himself delivering the cold open in the season-two episode "The Dream Sequence Always Rings Twice". It was Welles' last appearance before his death.
- Rita Wilson appeared as Carla in the season-five episode "Those Lips, Those Lies".
- Robert Wuhl was the "Nut in Holding Cell" in "Blonde on Blonde".

== Episodes ==
Season	Episodes	Originally released	
Season	Episodes	First released	Last released
1	7	March 3, 1985	April 2, 1985
2	18	September 24, 1985	May 13, 1986
3	15	September 23, 1986	May 5, 1987
4	14	September 29, 1987	March 22, 1988
5	13	December 6, 1988	May 14, 1989

== Format innovations ==
The series was created by Glenn Gordon Caron, one of the producers of the similar Remington Steele, when he was approached by ABC executive Lewis H. Erlicht. Erlicht liked the work Caron had done on Taxi and Remington Steele and wanted a detective show featuring a major star in a leading role who would appeal to an upscale audience. Caron wanted to do a romance, to which Erlicht replied, "I don't care what it is, as long as it's a detective show."

The tone of the series was left up to the production staff, resulting in Moonlighting becoming one of the first successful TV "dramedies"— dramatic-comedy, a style of television and movies in which an equal or nearly equal balance of humor and serious content is used. The show made use of fast-paced, overlapping dialogue between the two leads, harking back to classic screwball comedy films such as those of director Howard Hawks. These innovative qualities resulted in its being nominated, for the first time in the 50-year history of the Directors Guild of America, for both Best Drama and Best Comedy in the same year (both in 1985 and 1986).

=== Breaking the fourth wall ===
Moonlighting frequently broke the fourth wall, with many episodes including dialogue that made direct references to the scriptwriters, the audience, the network, or the series itself. (For example, when a woman is trying to commit suicide by jumping into a bathtub with a television playing The Three Stooges, Addison says, "The Stooges? Are you nuts? The network'll never let you do that, lady!")

Cold opens sometimes featured Shepherd and Willis (in character as Maddie Hayes and David Addison), other actors, viewers, or TV critics directly addressing the audience about the show's production itself. These cold opens were originally born out of desperation as a way to fill air time, since the dialogue on the show was spoken so quickly and the producers needed something to fill the entire hour. In some episodes, the production crew and sets became involved in the plot; in the final episode of the series, "Lunar Eclipse", Hayes and Addison find out that the show is being canceled, and the office set is dismantled around them as they argue with a producer.

=== Fantasy ===
The series also incorporated elements of fantasy and pastiche. In the second-season episode "The Dream Sequence Always Rings Twice", David and Maddie offer competing interpretations of an unsolved murder from the 1940s, with each version presented in an extended black-and-white dream sequence.

The two sequences were given contrasting visual styles, with Maddie's dream modelled on the polished appearance of an MGM studio production and David's on the grittier style associated with Warner Bros. films. The episode was shot using black-and-white film stock after series creator Glenn Gordon Caron rejected a proposal to film in colour and convert the footage later.

Orson Welles appeared in a specially filmed introduction explaining the episode's use of black and white. The introduction was recorded shortly before his death on October 10, 1985, and the episode, broadcast on October 15, was dedicated to his memory.

Fearing fan reaction to a popular show being shown in black and white, ABC demanded a disclaimer be made at the beginning of the episode to inform viewers of the "black-and-white" gimmick for the episode. The show's producers hired Orson Welles to deliver the introduction, which aired a few days after the actor's death.

"Atomic Shakespeare" features the cast performing a variation of The Taming of the Shrew, with David in the role of Petruchio, Maddie as Katharina, Agnes as Bianca, and Herbert as Lucentio. The episode features Shakespearean costumes and mixed the plot with humorous anachronisms and variations on Moonlighting's own running gags. The characters perform the dialogue in (mostly) iambic pentameter, and the episode is wrapped by segments featuring a boy imagining the episode's proceedings because his mother forced him to do his Shakespeare homework instead of watching Moonlighting.

=== Other ===
In addition, the show mocked its connection to Remington Steele by having Pierce Brosnan hop networks and make a cameo appearance as Steele in one episode. The show also acknowledged Hart to Hart as an influence: in the episode "It's a Wonderful Job", based on the film It's a Wonderful Life, Maddie's guardian angel showed her an alternate reality in which Jonathan and Jennifer Hart from the earlier series had taken over Blue Moon's lease. Although Robert Wagner and Stefanie Powers did not appear in the episode, Lionel Stander reprised his role as the Harts' assistant Max.

Both Shepherd and Willis sang musical numbers over the course of the show. In "The Dream Sequence Always Rings Twice", Shepherd performed both "Blue Moon" in Maddie's dream sequence and "I Told Ya I Love Ya, Now Get Out" in David's, while in "Atomic Shakespeare", Willis sings The Young Rascals' "Good Lovin'". Willis also frequently broke into shorter snippets of Motown songs. "Good Lovin'", "Blue Moon", and "I Told Ya I Love Ya..." appeared on the show's soundtrack album.

The episode "Big Man on Mulberry Street" centers around a production dance number set to the Billy Joel song of the same name. The sequence was directed by musical director Stanley Donen.

== Production ==
Moonlighting was unusual at the time for being one of only three shows, due to FCC regulations limiting the practice, to be owned and produced in-house by a broadcast network (NBC's Punky Brewster and CBS's Twilight Zone revival being the others). This allowed the network greater flexibility in budgeting the show, since the "back-end potential" for profits was so much greater with not having to pay a licensing fee to the film studio or independent production company. As a result, ABC gave Caron significant control over production. Caron, however, was a perfectionist and viewed Moonlighting as the filming of a one-hour movie every week, using techniques usually reserved for big-budget films. To capture the cinematic feel of the films of the 1940s, for example, he would prohibit the use of a zoom lens, opting instead to use more time-consuming master cameras that move back and forth on a track and require constant resetting of the lights. Diffusion disks were used to soften Cybill Shepherd's features, and a special lens needed to be employed so that in a two shot, Maddie would be diffused and David would not.

Much of the credit for this look and feel can be attributed to the hiring of Gerald Finnerman as the director of photography. Finnerman, a second-generation cinematographer, was brought up in the old school of cinematography by working with his father, Perry Finnerman, and later as a camera operator for Harry Stradling on such films as My Fair Lady and The Picture of Dorian Gray. Finnerman then went on to be the director of photography for the TV series Star Trek and was responsible for creating much of the mood in that show by employing black-and-white lighting techniques for color film. This background meshed perfectly with what Caron was trying to portray in the series, and earned him an Emmy nomination for the black-and-white episode "The Dream Sequence Always Rings Twice". Hired for the show after the pilot was shot, Finnerman became involved in virtually every aspect of the show, including the scripts, lighting, set design, and even directing some of the later episodes.

Typical scripts for an average one-hour television show run 60 pages, but those for Moonlighting were nearly twice as long because of the fast-talking, overlapping dialogue of the main characters. While the average television show took seven days to shoot, Moonlighting took from 12 to 14 days to complete, with episodes and dialogue often not being written by Caron until the day they were filmed. This attention to detail contributed to Moonlighting being one of the most expensive television shows being produced at the time. Where most episodes would cost around $900,000 to produce, Moonlighting was running nearly double that. The season-two episode "The Dream Sequence Always Rings Twice" could have been filmed much more cheaply by being shot in color and then decolorized, but Caron insisted on the authentic look of black-and-white film, which took 16 days to shoot, bringing the cost of the episode to the then-unheard-of sum of $2 million. Caron often defended his filming practices in the name of giving the audience what they wanted and producing a quality product. He used the following analogy to illustrate the point, "The thinking in television which makes no damn sense to me, is that a half hour of television costs X, and an hour of television costs Y, no matter what that television is, it strikes me as an insane hypothesis. The parallel is, you're hungry, whether you go to McDonald's or whether you go to '21,' it should cost the same; they both fill your stomach. It's nonsense."

All of this attention to detail resulted in production delays and the show became notorious for airing reruns when new episodes had not been completed in time for broadcast. The first two seasons of Moonlighting focused almost entirely on the two main characters, having them appear in almost every scene. According to Cybill Shepherd, "I left home at 5 am each day. Moonlighting scripts were close to a hundred pages, half again as long as the average one-hour television series. Almost from the moment the cameras started rolling, we were behind schedule, sometimes completing as few as 16 episodes per season, and never achieving the standard 22."

Glenn Gordon Caron partly blamed Cybill Shepherd for production problems:

"I don't mean to paint her as the sole bearer of responsibility for the discord. But if I said to you, 'You're going to have a great new job – it's a life-defining job – but you're going to work 14–15 hours a day, and by the way, you'll never know what hours those are – sometimes you'll start at noon and work until 3 am; other times you won't know when or where it will be [until the last minute].' It can be very difficult, it requires an amazing amount of stamina. It's easier to do if you're still reaching for the stars, it's a lot tougher if you're already a star, if you've already reached the top of the mountain."

Producer Jay Daniel talked about the difficulties between the costars in the later seasons:

"Well, I was the guy that more often than not would be the one that would go into the lion's den when they were having disagreements. I'd sort of be the referee, try to resolve it so that we could get back to work. So there was that side of it. Everybody knows there was friction between the two of them on the stage. In the beginning, Bruce was just a guy's guy. Let's just say he evolved. Over the years, he went from being the crew's best friend and just being grateful for the work and all of that to realizing that he was going to be a movie star and wanting to move on. Part of that was because of his strained relationship with Cybill. That sometimes made the set a very unpleasant place to be. Cybill – I got along with her very well at times, other times I'd have to be the one who said you have to come out of the trailer and go to work. In fairness to her, she was in the makeup chair at 6:30 in the morning with pages of dialogue she hadn't seen before, she'd work very long hours, and then be back in the makeup chair at 6:30 the next morning."

The delays became so great that even ABC mocked the lateness with an ad campaign showing network executives waiting impatiently for the arrival of new episodes at ABC's corporate headquarters. One episode featured television critic Jeff Jarvis in an introduction, sarcastically reminding viewers what was going on with the show's plot since it had been so long since the last new episode.

The season-three clipshow episode "The Straight Poop" also made fun of the episode delays by having Hollywood columnist Rona Barrett drop by the Blue Moon Detective Agency to figure out why David and Maddie could not get along, as the premise to set up the clips from earlier episodes. In the end, Rona convinced them to apologize to one another, and promised the viewers that there would be an all-new episode the following week.

Shepherd's real-life pregnancy and a skiing accident in which Willis broke his clavicle further contributed to production delays. To counter these problems, with the fourth season, the writers began to focus more of the show's attention on supporting cast members Agnes and Herbert, writing several episodes focusing on the two so that the show would be able to have episodes ready for airing.

== Ratings and decline ==
Moonlighting was a hit with TV audiences and with critics and industry insiders, with 16 Emmy nominations for the second season, in which Moonlighting tied for 20th place in the Nielsen ratings. In season three, the show peaked at 9th, then dropped off slightly to tie for 12th in the fourth season. By the end of the final season, the show was 49th in the ratings.

The show's ratings decline is popularly attributed to episode 14 of season three, "I Am Curious... Maddie", which had Maddie and David consummate their relationship after two and a half years of romantic tension. In commentaries on the third-season DVD set, Caron disputed that the event led to the show's decline, but that a number of other factors led to the series' decline and eventual cancellation. In the fourth season, Willis and Shepherd had scant screen time together. Jay Daniel explained that:

We had to do episodes where there was no Cybill. She was off having twins. Her scenes were shot early, early on and then you had to integrate them with scenes shot weeks later. You were locked into what those scenes were because of what had already been shot with Cybill.

Bruce Willis was filming Die Hard during this period. When the film became a blockbuster, a film career beckoned and his desire to continue in a weekly series waned. In a series that depended on the chemistry between the two main stars, not having them together for the bulk of the fourth season hurt the ratings. The series lost Glenn Gordon Caron as executive producer and head writer when he left the show over difficulties with the production:

I don't think Cybill understood how hard the workload was going to be. A situation arose with her, and at a certain point it became clear that… umm… suffice it to say I wasn't there for the last year and a half.

Shepherd recalled Caron left the show stating that it was either him or her, and he did not think the network would choose him.

When Maddie returned to Los Angeles near the end of the fourth season, the writers tried to recreate the tension between Maddie and David by having Maddie spontaneously marry a man named Walter Bishop (Dennis Dugan) within a few hours of meeting him on the train back to Los Angeles. When Shepherd read the script, she strongly voiced her objection that her character would not do such a thing, but was overruled. The move failed to rekindle the sparks between the main characters or capture the interest of the audience, which led to an even further ratings decline.

Others have suggested that the show lost its balance: in the first two seasons breaking the fourth wall was rare and solving cases was front and centre, but over time things became more based on unrealistic elements and relationships.

=== Cancellation ===
Neither of the principal stars was fully committed to the final season of the show. Bruce Willis, fresh from his Die Hard success, wanted to make more films. Cybill Shepherd, having just given birth to twins, had grown tired of the long, grueling production days and was ready for the series to end.

In the 1988–1989 TV season, the show's ratings declined precipitously. The March to August 1988 Writers Guild of America strike canceled plans for the 1987–1988 Moonlighting season finale to be filmed and aired on TV in three dimensions in a deal with Coca-Cola, and delayed the broadcast of the first new episode until December 6, 1988. The series went on hiatus during the February sweeps, and returned on Sunday evenings in the spring of 1989. Six more episodes aired before the series was canceled in May of that year.

In keeping with the show's tradition of "breaking the fourth wall", the last episode (fittingly titled "Lunar Eclipse") featured Maddie and David returning from Agnes and Herbert's wedding to find the Blue Moon sets being taken away, and an ABC network executive waiting to tell them that the show has been canceled. The characters then race through the studio lot in search of a television producer named Cy, as the world of Moonlighting is slowly dismantled.

When they find Cy, he is screening a print of "In 'n Outlaws", the episode of Moonlighting that had aired two weeks earlier. Once informed of the problem, Cy lectures David and Maddie on the perils of losing their audience and the fragility of romance. Cy was played by Dennis Dugan, the same actor who had played Walter Bishop in Maddie's marriage storyline – however, Dugan was also the director of the episode, so his acting credit was listed as "Walter Bishop". David and Maddie then admit defeat and that the show is ending, but not before Maddie tells David, "I can't imagine not seeing you again tomorrow." This is followed by a clip montage of previous Moonlighting episodes, then the episode ends with a message stating, "Blue Moon Investigations ceased operations on May 14, 1989. The Anselmo Case was never solved... and remains a mystery to this day."

The end was a huge relief. It was like having a 97-year-old person who had lived a rich and wonderful life, but now every part of their metabolism was in failure. It's a blessing if they go quietly.

— Charles Eglee, writer and producer

=== Syndication ===
As the show had not produced enough episodes to gain a syndication contract, following its original run, it was not widely seen until its DVD release, although it occasionally appeared on cable channels targeting women (including Lifetime and Bravo in the U.S. and W in Canada) in the 1990s and 2000s. Bravo airings often featured new claymation promotions with Maddie and David using original audio clips from the series. The "Atomic Shakespeare" episode aired on Nick at Nite in 2005 as part of the network's 20th-anniversary celebration. The 1985 ABC Tuesday-night line-up was honored with reruns of Who's the Boss?, Growing Pains, and Moonlighting, although "Atomic Shakespeare" was from the 1986–87 season.

BBC Two initially carried the show in the UK from 1986 to 1989, and it ran on Sky 1 circa 1991. It has been shown on CBS Drama since November 2009. Between 2005 and 2008, the show was frequently shown on the now-defunct channel ABC1. TVNZ aired the show in New Zealand in its entirety in the 1980s, and repeated it in 2004. In Asia, Moonlighting began airing seasons one and two on Rewind Network's HITS channel in December 2013. On October 10, 2023, it had commenced streaming on Hulu, digitally remastered in HD. As of January 2025, it is also streaming on Amazon Prime Video and in the UK on STV Player.

== Awards and nominations ==
Moonlighting was nominated for a wide range of awards, including nominations for 40 Emmy Awards of which it won six. It was also nominated for 10 Golden Globe Awards of which it won three.

== Home media ==
On February 6, 1991, the pilot was released on VHS by Warner Home Video.

Anchor Bay Entertainment released the original pilot episode on DVD in region 1. Lions Gate Entertainment later released the entire series of Moonlighting, including the pilot episode, on DVD in Region 1. Each release contains bonus features, including commentaries and featurettes. As of 2013, these releases have been discontinued and are out of print.

In Regions 2 and 4, Sony Pictures Home Entertainment has released all five seasons on DVD, although the Region 4 sets are now out of print. A complete series box set was also released in Region 2 on September 14, 2009.

Following the release of the series on DVD in the mid-2000s, Moonlighting had not been available on any streaming platform because of the costly music licensing. However, on October 5, 2022, Caron posted on his official Twitter account that work had begun to prepare all five seasons of the series for streaming. In September 2023, it was announced that all 67 episodes of the series, remastered in high definition, would be made available on Disney's streaming service Hulu starting October 10 that same year. The series will feature its theme song by Al Jarreau, and that "great care" was given to preserve as many original songs as possible. For example, songs sung by the actors and those that were deemed "critical" were retained, while songs used for background ambiance were replaced with new songs.

DVD Name	Ep #	Release Dates			Special Features
DVD Name	Ep #	Region 1	Region 2	Region 4	Special Features
Moonlighting - The Pilot Episode (1985)	1	January 25, 2000			Bruce Willis's Original Screen Test, 12-Page Booklet which includes Photos, Bios, & Cast/Crew Lists, Audio Commentary with actor Bruce Willis and creator Glenn Gordon Caron.
Seasons 1 and 2	25	May 31, 2005	October 6, 2008	March 21, 2006	"Not Just a Day Job, the Story of Moonlighting, Part 1", "Inside the Blue Moon Detective Agency, the Story of Moonlighting, Part 2", "The Moonlighting Phenomenon", Select Episode Commentaries. Includes the Pilot Movie.
Season 3	15	February 7, 2006	April 20, 2009	March 7, 2007	"Memories of Moonlighting", Select Episode Commentaries
Season 4	14	September 12, 2006	June 22, 2009	July 17, 2007	Select Episode Commentaries
Season 5	13	March 6, 2007	September 14, 2009	November 15, 2007	"Maddie And David In The Making", Audio Commentaries

== Parodies ==
Riptide, a once-popular detective series whose ratings had declined to the point of cancellation after airing against Moonlighting in the 1985–1986 television season, aired an episode (the show's penultimate) in 1986, in which that show's detectives acted as mentors to "Rosalind Grant" (Annette McCarthy) and "Cary Russell" (H. Richard Greene), the bickering stars of a television detective-show pilot. Although their names were an allusion to Cary Grant and Rosalind Russell, the characters were written as parodies of Shepherd and Willis, even adopting some of their real mannerisms and clothing styles, and their dialogue contained many nods, both obvious and subtle, to Moonlighting's writing style. The episode was explicitly promoted by NBC (Riptide's network) as a Moonlighting parody, and was publicized as such widely enough that Riptide's producers felt obliged to clarify that they liked Moonlighting and intended the episode as an homage. The episode was even titled "If You Can't Beat 'Em, Join 'Em".

== See also ==
- List of Moonlighting episodes
- Moonlighting soundtrack
- Detective couple, Nick and Nora Charles
