= Tesevatinib =

Chemical compound

Clinical data
- Routes of administration: Oral administration (tablets)

Pharmacokinetic data
- Elimination half-life: 50–70 hours

Identifiers
- IUPAC name: N-(3,4-dichloro-2-fluorophenyl)-6-methoxy-7-{[(3aR,5r,6aS)-2-methyloctahydrocyclopenta[c]pyrrol-5-yl]methoxy}quinazolin-4-amine
- CAS Number: 781613-23-8
- PubChem CID: 10458325
- DrugBank: DB11973
- ChemSpider: 32699556
- UNII: F6XM2TN5A1
- KEGG: D11772

Chemical and physical data
- Formula: C_{24}H_{25}Cl_{2}FN_{4}O_{2}
- Molar mass: 491.39 g·mol^{−1}
- 3D model (JSmol): Interactive image
- SMILES: CN1C[C@H]2C[C@H](C[C@H]2C1)COc3cc4c(cc3OC)c(ncn4)Nc5ccc(c(c5F)Cl)Cl
- InChI: InChI=1S/C24H25Cl2FN4O2/c1-31-9-14-5-13(6-15(14)10-31)11-33-21-8-19-16(7-20(21)32-2)24(29-12-28-19)30-18-4-3-17(25)22(26)23(18)27/h3-4,7-8,12-15H,5-6,9-11H2,1-2H3,(H,28,29,30)/t13-,14-,15+; Key:HVXKQKFEHMGHSL-QKDCVEJESA-N

Tesevatinib (KD019, XL647) is an experimental drug proposed for use in kidney cancer and polycystic kidney disease. The drug was first developed by Exelixis, Inc. and was later acquired by Kadmon Corporation. Tesevatinib binds to and inhibits several tyrosine receptor kinases that play major roles in tumor cell proliferation and tumor vascularization, including epidermal growth factor receptor (EGFR; ERBB1), epidermal growth factor receptor 2 (HER2; ERBB2), vascular endothelial growth factor receptor (VEGFR), and ephrin B4 (EphB4).

The drug activity was initially studied in non-small cell lung cancer. In a 2007 pre-clinical study with xenograft tumors of an erlotinib-resistant cell line tesevatinib substantially inhibited the growth of these tumors. In polycystic kidney disease, a histological study of the drug effects and toxicity in rats and mice was published in July 2017.

As of March 2019 the drug was in Phase II clinical trials for the treatment of polycystic kidney disease in adults and children.
