= Martha: Behind Bars =

2005 television film

Martha: Behind Bars (2005) is a TV-movie about Martha Stewart's court case regarding ImClone stocks, and subsequent time in prison. It aired on September 25, 2005. It stars Cybill Shepherd as Martha Stewart.

The film was directed by Eric Bross. Humber College Lakeshore, a primary location for shooting, served as "Camp Cupcake".

An earlier film about Stewart, Martha, Inc.: The Story of Martha Stewart (with Shepherd playing Stewart for the first time), had aired on NBC in 2003, and the network had also scheduled the show The Apprentice: Martha Stewart for September 2005. This meant that Martha: Behind Bars was picked up by competitor CBS. The movie aired on Showtime Australia in Australia and has been shown on Sky Movies in the United Kingdom.
