= Moonlighting (soundtrack) =

Soundtrack album by Various Artists
- Released: 1987
- Genre: Soul
- Length: 32:11
- Label: MCA Records
- Producer: Phil Ramone and Glenn Gordon Caron

Singles from Moonlighting
- 1. "Moonlighting" Released: May 29, 1987

Professional ratings
Review scores
Source	Rating
New Musical Express	3/10

Moonlighting: The Television Soundtrack Album is the soundtrack to the ABC television series Moonlighting and was produced by Phil Ramone and Glenn Gordon Caron.

== Background ==
The album features songs performed on the show by series leads Cybill Shepherd and Bruce Willis, alongside the series theme song performed by Al Jarreau, which was the later Nile Rodgers-produced version used in seasons 4 and 5. That single peaked at number one on the Billboard Adult Contemporary chart on July 25, 1987. Other songs include Chubby Checker's "Limbo Rock", the Isley Brothers's "This Old Heart of Mine (Is Weak for You)", and "When a Man Loves a Woman" by Percy Sledge.

== Track listing ==
No.	Title	Writer(s)	Artist(s)	Length
1.	"Moonlighting" (opening and closing credits, September 1987 – May 1989)	Lee Holdridge, Al Jarreau	Al Jarreau	3:00
2.	"Limbo Rock" (S02E05 "My Fair David")	Billy Strange, Kal Mann	Chubby Checker	2:23
3.	"This Old Heart of Mine (Is Weak for You)" (S02E06 "Knowing Her")	Brian Holland, Lamont Dozier, Eddie Holland	The Isley Brothers	2:51
4.	"Blue Moon" (S02E04 "The Dream Sequence Always Rings Twice")	Lorenz Hart, Richard Rodgers	Cybill Shepherd	2:19
5.	"I Told Ya I Love Ya, Now Get Out" (S02E04 "The Dream Sequence Always Rings Twice")	Herb Ellis, Johnny Frigo, Lou Carter	Cybill Shepherd	2:03
6.	"Good Lovin'" (S03E07 "Atomic Shakespeare")	Artie Resnick, Rudy Clark	Bruce Willis	3:15
7.	"Since I Fell for You" (S03E11 "Blonde on Blonde")	Buddy Johnson	Bob James, David Sanborn, Al Jarreau	5:48
8.	"When a Man Loves a Woman" (S03E14 "I Am Curious… Maddie")	Calvin Lewis, Andrew Wright	Percy Sledge	2:48
9.	"Someone to Watch Over Me" (S03E13 "Maddie's Turn to Cry")	George Gershwin, Ira Gershwin	Linda Ronstadt & The Nelson Riddle Orchestra	4:06
10.	"Stormy Weather" (S03E14 "I Am Curious… Maddie")	Harold Arlen, Ted Koehler	Billie Holiday	3:38

== Charts ==
Weekly chart performance for Moonlighting: the Television Soundtrack Album
Chart (1987–88)	Peak position
Australian Albums (Kent Music Report)	88
UK Albums (OCC)	5
US Billboard 200	50
