= Martha, Inc.: The Story of Martha Stewart =

- Based on: Martha, Inc. by Christopher M. Byron
- Teleplay by: Suzette Couture
- Directed by: Jason Ensler
- Starring: Cybill Shepherd; Tim Matheson
- Music by: Adam Cohen
- Countries of origin: Canada; United States
- Original language: English

Production
- Producer: Michael Mahoney
- Cinematography: Paul Sarossy
- Editor: Sandra Montiel
- Running time: 120 min.
- Production company: Jaffe/Braunstein Films

Original release
- Network: NBC
- Release: May 19, 2003

Martha, Inc.: The Story of Martha Stewart is a 2003 television film starring Cybill Shepherd as Martha Stewart, in which the life of Martha Stewart is outlined starting from her life in New Jersey to the scandal behind her arrest. The film was shot in Nova Scotia. The film aired on NBC on May 19, 2003.

Shepherd also played Martha Stewart in the 2005 CBS television movie Martha: Behind Bars.
