= Belumosudil =

Chemical compound

Clinical data
- Trade names: Rezurock, others
- Other names: KD025, SLx-2119
- AHFS/Drugs.com: Monograph
- MedlinePlus: a621043
- License data: US DailyMed: Belumosudil
- Pregnancy category: AU: D
- Routes of administration: By mouth
- ATC code: L04AA48 (WHO)

Legal status
- Legal status: AU: S4 (Prescription only); CA: ℞-only; US: ℞-only; EU: Rx-only

Identifiers
- IUPAC name: 2-[3-[4-(1H-Indazol-5-ylamino)quinazolin-2-yl]phenoxy]-N-propan-2-ylacetamide
- CAS Number: 911417-87-3; as salt: 2109704-99-4
- PubChem CID: 11950170; as salt: 146025939
- DrugBank: DB16703; as salt: DBSALT003188
- ChemSpider: 10124479
- UNII: 834YJF89WO; as salt: 6MX7XE1M0U
- KEGG: D11815; as salt: D11816
- ChEMBL: ChEMBL2005186; as salt: ChEMBL4802130
- CompTox Dashboard (EPA): DTXSID80238425

Chemical and physical data
- Formula: C_{26}H_{24}N_{6}O_{2}
- Molar mass: 452.518 g·mol^{−1}
- 3D model (JSmol): Interactive image
- SMILES: CC(C)NC(=O)COC1=CC=CC(=C1)C2=NC3=CC=CC=C3C(=N2)NC4=CC5=C(C=C4)NN=C5
- InChI: InChI=1S/C26H24N6O2/c1-16(2)28-24(33)15-34-20-7-5-6-17(13-20)25-30-23-9-4-3-8-21(23)26(31-25)29-19-10-11-22-18(12-19)14-27-32-22/h3-14,16H,15H2,1-2H3,(H,27,32)(H,28,33)(H,29,30,31); Key:GKHIVNAUVKXIIY-UHFFFAOYSA-N

Belumosudil, sold under the brand name Rezurock among others, is a medication used for the treatment of chronic graft versus host disease (cGvHD). It is in the class of drugs known as serine/threonine kinase inhibitors. Specifically, it is an inhibitor of Rho-associated coiled-coil kinase 2 (ROCK2; ROCK-II). ROCK2-mediated signaling pathways are major players in pro- and anti-inflammatory immune cell responses. A study in cultured human cells demonstrated that the drug also has effects on oxidative phosphorylation, WNT signaling, angiogenesis, and KRAS signaling.

The most common side effects include infection, tiredness or weakness, nausea, diarrhea, shortness of breath, cough, swelling, bleeding, stomach (abdominal) pain, muscle or bone pain, headache, and high blood pressure.

Belumosudil was approved for medical use in the United States in July 2021, The US Food and Drug Administration considers it to be a first-in-class medication. in Australia in November 2021, in Canada in March 2022, and in the European Union in March 2026.

== Medical uses ==
Belumosudil is indicated for the treatment of people aged twelve years of age and older with chronic graft-versus-host disease (chronic GVHD) after failure of at least two prior lines of systemic therapy.

Chronic graft-versus-host disease is a complication that can occur after stem cell or bone marrow transplantation in which the transplanted donor cells attack the transplant recipient's body.

== History ==
Originally developed by Surface Logix, Inc, belumosudil was later acquired by Kadmon Corporation. By July 2020, the drug completed Phase II clinical studies for cGvHD, IPF, and psoriasis.

Chronic graft-versus-host disease is a complication that can follow allogeneic stem cell or hematopoietic stem cell transplantation where the transplanted cells (graft) attack healthy cells (host). This causes inflammation and fibrosis in multiple tissues. Two cytokines controlled by the ROCK2 signaling pathway, IL-17 and IL-21, have a major role in the chronic graft-versus-host disease response. In a 2016 report using both mouse models and a limited human clinical trial ROCK2 inhibition with belumosudil targeted both the immunologic and fibrotic components of chronic graft-versus-host disease and reversed the symptoms of the disease.

In October 2017, belumosudil was granted orphan drug status in the United States for treatment of people with chronic graft-versus-host disease.

Efficacy of belumosudil was evaluated in clinical trial NCT03640481, a randomized, open-label, multicenter dose-ranging trial that included 65 participants with chronic graft-versus-host disease who were treated with belumosudil 200 mg taken orally once daily. A total of eighty-three (83) participants were evaluated for safety; therefore, the number of participants representing efficacy findings may differ from the number of participants representing safety findings due to different pools of study participants analyzed for efficacy and safety. The trial was conducted at 28 sites in the United States.

In July 2021, the US Food and Drug Administration approved belumosudil for people aged twelve years of age and older with chronic graft-versus-host disease after failure of at least two prior lines of systemic therapy.

== Society and culture ==
=== Legal status ===
In October 2025, the European Medicines Agency (EMA) recommended the refusal of the marketing authorization for Rezurock, a medicine intended for the treatment of chronic graft-versus-host disease (a condition in which donor cells attack the body's organs) after a stem-cell transplant. In January 2026, the Committee for Medicinal Products for Human Use of the EMA, following a re-examination procedure, adopted a positive opinion, recommending the granting of a conditional marketing authorization for the medicinal product Rezurock, intended for the treatment of chronic graft-versus-host disease (cGVHD) in last line patients, aged twelve years of age and older who weigh at least 40 kg (88 lb). The applicant for this medicinal product is Sanofi Winthrop Industrie. Belumosudil was authorized for medical use in the European Union in March 2026.
