= HPV-associated oropharyngeal cancer awareness and prevention =

Human papillomavirus (HPV)-associated oropharyngeal cancer awareness and prevention is a vital concept from a public and community health perspective.

HPV is the sexually transmitted virus that is known to be the cause of genital warts. There are currently more than 100 different strains of HPV, half of which can cause genital infections. Although it is not usually the HPV strains that cause genital warts associated with the oropharyngeal cancers, they have transmitted the same way through oral-genital sexual contact, and consumers should protect themselves accordingly and adhere to routine health and dental screening schedule to monitor and maintain their health status. Many people with HPV do not develop any symptoms but can still infect others through sexual contact. Symptoms may include warts on the genitals or surrounding skin. There's no cure for the virus and warts may go away on their own. Treatment focuses on removing the warts. A vaccine that prevents infection with the HPV strains most likely to cause genital warts and cervical cancer is recommended for boys and girls.

== Detection ==
Learning and utilizing self-examinations of your body, checking for changes or abnormalities in your mouth while performing your oral hygiene as well as routine checks of your genitals after showering can enhance your awareness of changes in your health status. According to the Centers for Disease Control and Prevention (CDC), most sexually active people are likely to acquire at least one HPV infection in their lifetime. It is important that consumers seek routine dental examinations as a part of their health care to allow screening of this type of cancer, as early detection can mean all the difference in treatments. Oral cavity and oropharyngeal cancers can occur anywhere in the mouth but occur most often in the tongue, tonsils, oropharynx (back of the throat), gums, and the floor of the mouth. According to the U.S. Preventative Services Task Force, "Oropharyngeal cancer is difficult to visualize and is usually located at the base of the tongue (the back third of the tongue), the soft palate (the back part of the roof of the mouth), the tonsils, and the side and back walls of the throat" and requires a thorough examination by a dental provider or preferably a specialist. Men are twice as likely as women to have oral cancer, regardless of race, as African-Americans and Caucasians are equally likely to develop oral cancer.

== Cancer ==
Many people do not realize that some cancers can be linked to viral illnesses like an HPV infection. Oropharyngeal cancer has been linked in some cases to HPV. The most common type (indicated in about 90%) of oral and oropharyngeal cancer is squamous cell carcinoma. Approximately 63% of oropharyngeal squamous cell carcinomas each year are associated with HPV infection. Most cases of HPV go undetected and clear up on their own without the patient ever knowing they had contracted it.

There are 13 HPV strains that are known to potentially cause cancer. According to the CDC, during an analysis of reported data from national cancer and epidemiological registries between 2008 and 2012, of 30,700 cases of cancer estimated to be caused by HPV, 24,600 (9500 oropharyngeal) were found to be caused by strains HPV 16 and HPV 18 (which are preventable through vaccination) and 3,800 (900 oropharyngeal) were found to be caused by 5 other preventable strains.

== Prevention ==
Vaccination is recommended for females and males alike, as early as age 9 and up to 26 years of age. Pre-teens can get their HPV vaccination at the same time as other scheduled vaccinations and boosters for convenience, as they can be safely administered together. Parents should speak to their child's paediatrician regarding their recommendations for vaccinations. Pregnant women are recommended to wait until after they deliver to receive the vaccination. Anyone with allergy concerns especially to yeast should consult their physician.

Initially, Gardasil (bivalent, quadrivalent, and 9-valent versions) and Cervarix brands were available; however, as of now only Gardasil 9 (9-valent) is available for vaccination in the U.S. (9-valent simply refers to the 9 strains that the vaccine helps to protect against that are known to be associated with cancers).

The World Health Organization (WHO) says between 30% and 50% of cancer deaths could be prevented by avoiding alcohol and tobacco products, especially concurrent use. It also indicates there are about 529,000 new cases of cancers of the oral cavity and pharynx each year, and more than 300,000 deaths. "The American Cancer Society's most recent estimates for oral cavity and oropharyngeal cancers in the United States for 2017 are that about 49,670 people will get oral cavity or oropharyngeal cancer and an estimated 9,700 people will die of them."
