= Samuel D. Waksal =

American immunologist, businessman and convicted insider trader

- Born: Samuel David Waksal; September 8, 1947 (age 78); Paris, France
- Citizenship: United States
- Education: PhD
- Alma mater: Ohio State University
- Occupations: Scientist, biotechnology executive, insider trader
- Years active: 1979–present
- Known for: Founder of ImClone Systems and Kadmon Pharmaceuticals
- Board member of: Cadus Corporation, Antigenics Inc., Test University, Rockefeller University
- Criminal charges: fraud, conspiracy, perjury
- Criminal penalty: 87 months imprisonment
- Criminal status: released

Samuel D. Waksal (born September 8, 1947) is the founder and former CEO of the biopharmaceutical company ImClone Systems. He is also the founder of Kadmon Pharmaceuticals, which was financed with private capital and commenced operations in New York City in 2010. At ImClone, Waksal led the company to develop the cancer drug Erbitux (cetuximab). During the course of its review process with the Food and Drug Administration (FDA) Waksal became involved in an insider trading scandal revolving around improper communications with personal friends and family members. He was convicted of several securities violations, served time in federal prison, and was released.

== Education and early career ==
Waksal was born on September 8, 1947, in Paris, France, to a Jewish family, the son of Holocaust survivors. He earned a bachelor's degree in 1969 and a doctorate in immunobiology in 1974, both from The Ohio State University.

Over the next 15 years, he worked as a medical researcher at Stanford University, the National Cancer Institute, Tufts University and Mount Sinai Hospital, New York. However, he often faced scrutiny for misrepresenting the source of material and fabricating lab results.

== ImClone Systems ==
Waksal founded ImClone Systems in 1984. The company was engaged in several research and development projects before filing its first Biologic License Application with the FDA in 2001. When it won the rights to develop Erbitux, a cancer antibody, the drug's clinical success caused ImClone's stock to reach a high of $70 a share. In September 2001, Bristol-Myers Squibb was intrigued enough by Erbitux to sign a $2 billion deal with the company in return for the marketing rights to the drug. In December 2001, however, the FDA issued a Refuse to File decision effectively turning down ImClone's application due to concerns about the structure of the clinical trials. In 2004, Erbitux was approved by the FDA. In 2008, the drug generated over $1.5 billion in sales and was credited with aiding thousands of cancer patients. That same year, ImClone was sold to Eli Lilly and Company for $6.5 billion.

== Criminal activity and conviction ==
Waksal became aware of the FDA's rejection on Christmas Day 2001. Unable to get the FDA to reconsider, ImClone began drafting a press release announcing the Erbitux rejection. This was due to be released at the close of business on December 28. Until then, under federal securities law, Waksal was barred from selling his ImClone stock or telling anyone about the pending rejection. However, public release of the Erbitux rejection would expose Waksal to a number of financial problems beyond the near-certainty of ImClone's stock sliding. For example, Waksal had pledged a warrant to buy ImClone shares as collateral for a loan from Bank of America despite having already executed the warrant in 2000. If Bank of America discovered the warrant was no longer valid, Waksal could be charged with bank fraud. He tipped off several of his friends and family to sell their ImClone stock. When Waksal's broker at Merrill Lynch, Peter Bacanovic, became aware of the pending rejection, he alerted their mutual friend, Martha Stewart, that ImClone was about to lose a good deal of its value.

Waksal was arrested June 12, 2002 on insider trading charges. On October 15, he pleaded guilty to charges of securities fraud, bank fraud, obstruction of justice, and perjury.

On March 3, 2003, he pleaded guilty to charges of conspiracy and wire fraud for avoiding $1.2 million in sales taxes on $15 million in artwork. The art included works by Mark Rothko, Richard Serra, Roy Lichtenstein, and Willem de Kooning, purchased between June 2000 and October 2001.

On June 10, 2003, Waksal was sentenced to seven years and three months in prison and ordered to pay more than $4 million in fines and back taxes, all the maximum punishments allowable under law. Waksal wanted to go to Federal Prison Camp, Eglin, but instead he went to Federal Correctional Institution, Schuylkill. He was later transferred to the Federal Correctional Institution, Milan. On February 9, 2009, Waksal, Federal Bureau of Prisons (BOP) # 53803-054, was released from BOP custody.

== Kadmon Pharmaceuticals ==
In 2009, upon his release from prison Waksal began fundraising and launched the company Kadmon Pharmaceuticals in New York City. Waksal was forced to step down from the CEO position in 2014 as the company planned an IPO, because his sentence also ruled that he was banned from being as an officer or director to any public company for life. With Waksal leaving the role, his brother Harlan began as CEO. Waksal remained with the company and transitioned into the role of Chief of Innovation. In February 2016, Waksal left the Kadmon Pharmaceuticals but remained a shareholder in the company. In June 2016, the company announced it had filed the paperwork to undergo an IPO. In July 2016, the company raised $75 million in its IPO.

== Personal life ==
Waksal is divorced from Cynthia F. Waksal; they had two children: Aliza and Elana. His daughter, Elana, is married to Jarrett Posner, son of Steven Posner and grandson of Victor Posner. Waksal dated Martha Stewart's daughter, Alexis, for several years prior to his criminal conviction. As of 2016, he was reported to hold executive positions with the New York Biotechnology Association and the New York Council for the Humanities, and is a member of the board of advisors of Rockefeller University.

== See also ==
- Chip Skowron, hedge fund portfolio manager convicted of insider trading
