= Cybill Shepherd =

American actress and former model (born 1950)

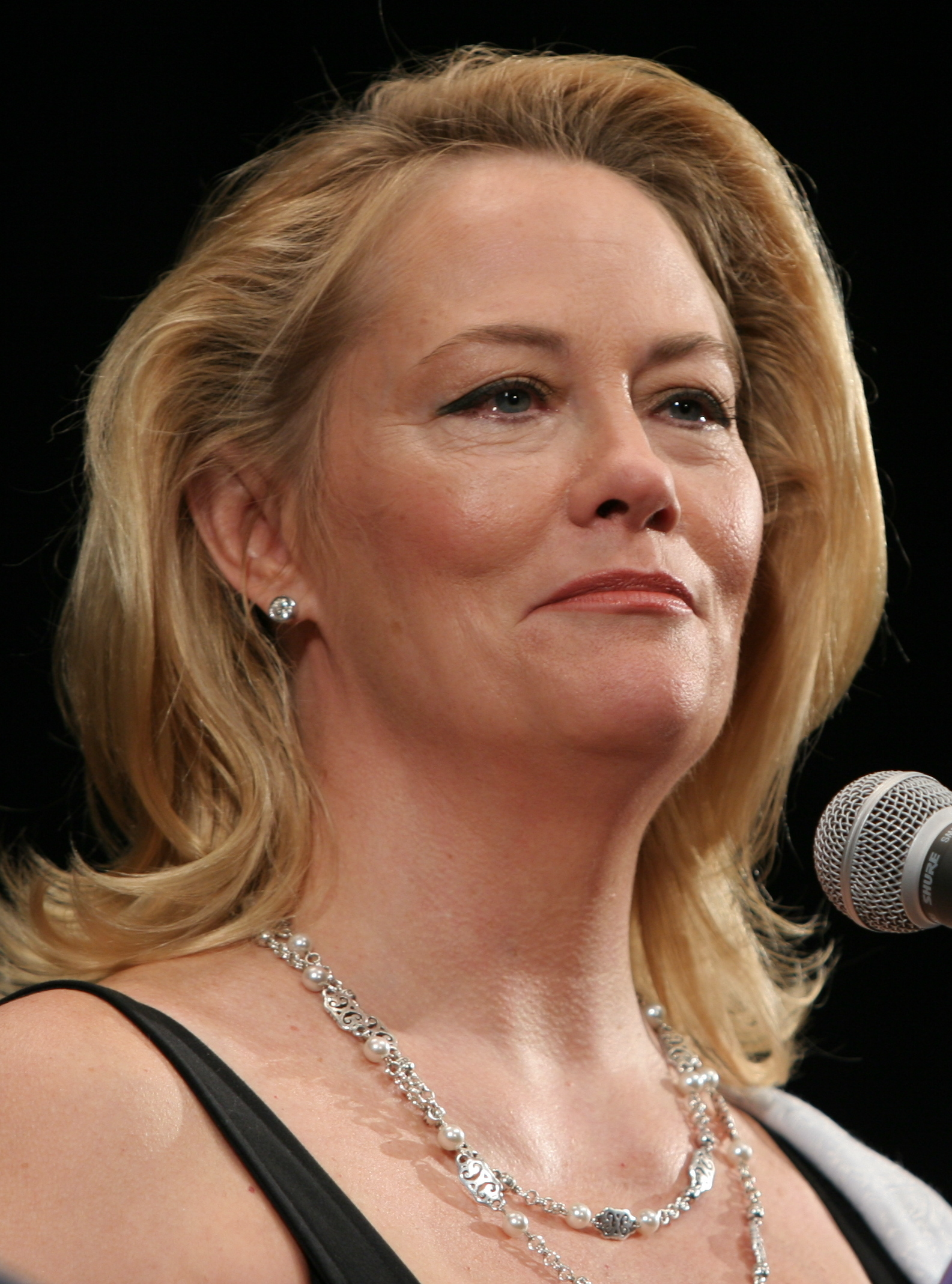
- Shepherd in 2007
- Born: Cybill Lynne Shepherd; February 18, 1950 (age 76); Memphis, Tennessee, U.S.
- Occupations: Actress; singer; model
- Years active: 1968–present
- Spouses: David Ford (m. 1978; div. 1982) Bruce Oppenheim (m. 1987; div. 1990)
- Children: 3, including Clementine Ford

Cybill Lynne Shepherd (born February 18, 1950) is an American actress, singer, and former model. Her film debut and breakthrough role came as Jacy Farrow in Peter Bogdanovich's coming-of-age drama The Last Picture Show (1971). Her collaborations with Bogdanovich continued with lead roles in the period piece Daisy Miller (1974), the musical At Long Last Love (1975), and the The Last Picture Show sequel Texasville (1990). She also had roles as Kelly in Elaine May's The Heartbreak Kid (1972), Betsy in Martin Scorsese's Taxi Driver (1976), Corinne Jeffries in the romantic fantasy comedy Chances Are (1989), and Nancy in Woody Allen's Alice (1990).

On television, her first major role was as Colleen Champion in the one season of the night-time drama The Yellow Rose (1983). Shepherd played Madelyn Hayes on the detective comedy-drama Moonlighting (1985–1989) opposite Bruce Willis, for which she won two Golden Globes for Best Actress in a Television Series - Musical or Comedy out of three such nominations. She later starred as Cybill Sheridan on Cybill (1995–1998), for which she won her third Golden Globe Award as Best Actress in a Television Series - Musical or Comedy. Her later television roles included Phyllis Kroll on The L Word (2007–2009), Madeleine Spencer on Psych (2008–2013), Cassie in the television film The Client List (2010), and Linette Montgomery on The Client List (2012–2013).

== Early life ==
Shepherd was born February 18, 1950, in Memphis, Tennessee. She is the second of three children. She had an older sister, Terry, and has a younger brother, William. Cybill was named with a blend of her grandfather Cy and her father Bill's names. While attending East High School, Shepherd won the "Miss Teenage Memphis" title and represented the city at the 1966 Miss Teenage America pageant at age 16, where she won the congeniality award. She competed at the 1968 "Model of the Year" contest at age 18, resulting in fashion model assignments through high school and afterwards.

== Career ==
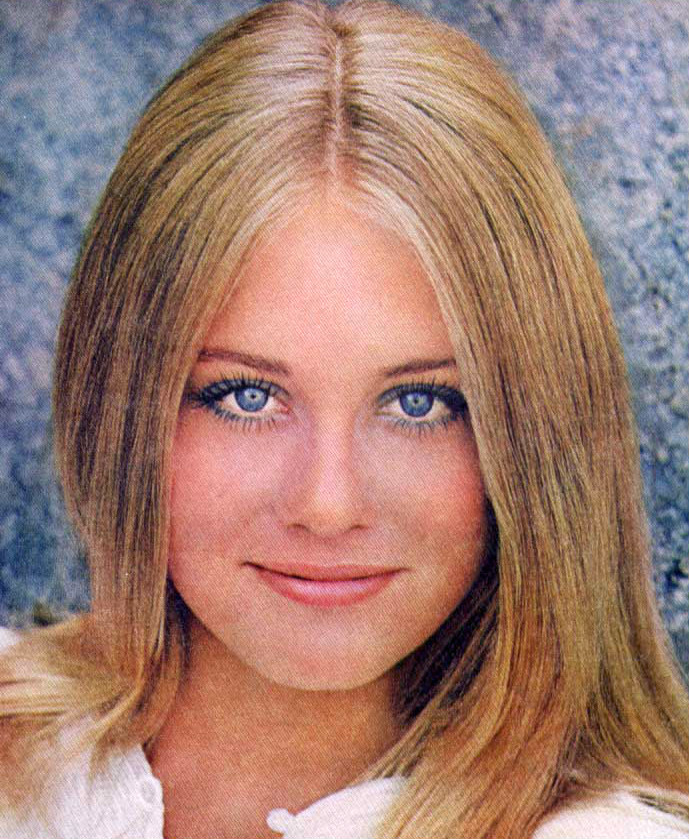
Cybill Shepherd in a photo from Teen from 1970

According to Shepherd's autobiography, a 1970 Glamour magazine cover caught the eye of film director Peter Bogdanovich. His then-wife, Polly Platt, claimed that when she saw the cover in a check-out line in a Ralphs grocery store in southern California, he said "That's Jacy," (Note: Polly Platt talks about the magazine cover discovery in the film documentary based on the Peter Biskind book, Easy Riders, Raging Bulls.) referring to the role Bogdanovich was casting—and ultimately given to Shepherd—in The Last Picture Show (1971).

=== Celebrity ===
Her first film was The Last Picture Show, also starring Jeff Bridges and Timothy Bottoms. The film became a critical and box office hit, earning eight Academy Awards nominations and winning two. Shepherd was nominated for a Golden Globe. In 1972, Shepherd was cast opposite Charles Grodin in The Heartbreak Kid. She played Kelly, a young woman for whom Grodin's character falls while on his honeymoon in Miami. Directed by Elaine May and written by Neil Simon, it was another critical and box office hit. Also in 1972, Shepherd posed as a Kodak Girl for the camera manufacturer's then-ubiquitous cardboard store poster displays.

In 1974, Shepherd again teamed up with Peter Bogdanovich for the title role in Daisy Miller, based on the Henry James novella. The film—a period piece set in Europe—was a box office failure. That same year, she launched a singing career, releasing a studio album Cybill Does It...To Cole Porter for MCA Records. It was panned by Village Voice critic Robert Christgau, who wrote: "Her voice is surprisingly pleasant, but you'd never know how these songs sparkle. Since Cole didn't like to . . . do it with (or 'to') women very much, maybe the 'do' is as hostile as it sounds."

In 1975, she made At Long Last Love, a film musical directed by Bogdanovich. The film received scathing negative reviews, named by many as the worst major film of the year, and Shepherd herself received negative reviews.

Shepherd returned with good reviews for her supporting work in Martin Scorsese's Taxi Driver (1976). According to Shepherd, Scorsese had requested a "Cybill Shepherd type" for the role. She portrayed Betsy, a volunteer for a presidential candidate with whom Robert De Niro's character, Travis Bickle, becomes infatuated.

A series of less-successful roles followed, including The Lady Vanishes (1979), a remake of Alfred Hitchcock's 1938 film. Already sitting in on an acting class taught by Stella Adler, Shepherd was offered work at a dinner theater in Norfolk, Virginia, and turned to friend Orson Welles for advice. He encouraged her to get experience on stage in front of an audience, anywhere but Los Angeles or New York City, away from the harsh big-city critics so she moved back to her home town of Memphis to work in regional theatre.

In 1981, Shepherd appeared in a play directed by Orson Bean, Vanities, staged in St. Louis, Missouri.

=== Return to Hollywood ===
In 1982, Shepherd returned to New York and to the stage when she played alongside James MacArthur in a theatre tour of Lunch Hour by Jean Kerr. The following year, Shepherd went back to Los Angeles and was cast as Colleen Champion in the NBC television drama The Yellow Rose (1983), opposite Sam Elliott. Although critically acclaimed, the series lasted only one season. A year later, Shepherd was cast as Maddie Hayes on Moonlighting (1985–1989), a role that defined her career. The producers knew that her role depended on having "chemistry" with her co-star, and involved her in the selection of Bruce Willis. A lighthearted combination of mystery and comedy, the series won Shepherd two Golden Globe Awards.

Shepherd in 1985

She starred in Chances Are (1989) with Robert Downey Jr. and Ryan O'Neal, receiving excellent reviews. She then reprised her role as Jacy in Texasville (1990), the sequel to The Last Picture Show (1971), as the original cast (and director Peter Bogdanovich) reunited 20 years after filming the original. She appeared in Woody Allen's Alice (1990) and Eugene Levy's Once Upon a Crime (1992), as well as several television films. In 1997, she won her third Golden Globe award for Cybill (1995–1998), a television sitcom in which the title character, Cybill Sheridan, an actress struggling with hammy roles in B movies and bad soap operas, was loosely modeled on herself, including portrayals of her two ex-husbands and her then-teenage daughter.

In 2000, Shepherd's bestselling autobiography, Cybill Disobedience: How I Survived Beauty Pageants, Elvis, Sex, Bruce Willis, Lies, Marriage, Motherhood, Hollywood, and the Irrepressible Urge to Say What I Think, written in collaboration with Aimee Lee Ball, was published. That same year, Shepherd hosted a short-lived syndicated talk show version of the book Men Are from Mars, Women Are from Venus, but left the show in early 2001. (Note: Shepherd was replaced on the talk show by Cristina Ferrare, Bo Griffin, Sam Phillips, Drew Pinsky, and Rondell Sheridan.) In 2003, she guest-starred on 8 Simple Rules as the sister of Cate Hennessy (portrayed by Katey Sagal). She has played Martha Stewart in two television films: Martha, Inc.: The Story of Martha Stewart (2003) and Martha: Behind Bars (2005).

From 2007 until it ended, Shepherd appeared on The L Word as Phyllis Kroll for the show's final three seasons. In 2008, she joined the cast of Psych as main character Shawn Spencer's mother, Madeleine Spencer. On November 7, 2008, Shepherd guest-starred in a February episode of the CBS drama Criminal Minds. In 2010 Shepherd appeared in an episode of No Ordinary Family and in November of the same year she guest-starred in an episode of $♯*! My Dad Says.

Shepherd appeared alongside Jennifer Love Hewitt in the 2010 television film The Client List and then in the 2012-13 series based on the film.

In July 2012, Shepherd made her Broadway debut in the revival of Gore Vidal's The Best Man at the Gerald Schoenfeld Theatre alongside James Earl Jones, John Stamos, John Larroquette, Kristin Davis, and Elizabeth Ashley to positive reviews.

Shepherd appeared as a mother grieving the death of her daughter in Do You Believe? (2015), a Christian-themed movie produced by Pure Flix Entertainment.

In 2017, she took on a role as an ex-cop senior struggling with illness who unexpectedly finds love on a road trip in the direct-to-cable Being Rose.

In 2023, Shepherd starred in the Lifetime film How to Murder Your Husband: The Nancy Brophy Story, where she portrayed Nancy Brophy, opposite Steve Guttenberg as Daniel Brophy, in a dramatization of the Murder of Daniel Brophy.

== Personal life ==
Shepherd began a relationship with Peter Bogdanovich on the set of The Last Picture Show, during his marriage to Polly Platt, whom Bogdanovich subsequently divorced. Their relationship lasted eight years. The dissolution of Bogdanovich and Platt's marriage, and Bogdanovich's relationship with Shepherd, was parodied in the 1984 comedy film Irreconcilable Differences (in which analogues of Bogdanovich, Platt, and Shepherd are played by Ryan O'Neal, Shelley Long, and Sharon Stone respectively; the character based on Shepherd is portrayed as a diva with middling talent).

In her autobiography, Shepherd revealed that she called her mother in 1978, crying and unhappy with the way her life and career were going. Her mother replied, "Cybill, come home." Shepherd went home to Memphis, where she met and began dating David M. Ford, a local auto parts dealer and nightclub entertainer. She became pregnant, and the couple married that year. Their daughter, Clementine Ford, was born in 1979. The marriage ended in divorce in 1982.

In 1987, Shepherd became pregnant by chiropractor Bruce Oppenheim and married him. They had twins, born during the fourth season of Moonlighting. The couple divorced in 1990. She had a relationship with author Larry McMurtry, whom she once called the love of her life.

In June 2012, Shepherd became engaged to psychologist Andrei Nikolajevic. By 2015, the engagement had been called off.

=== Activism ===
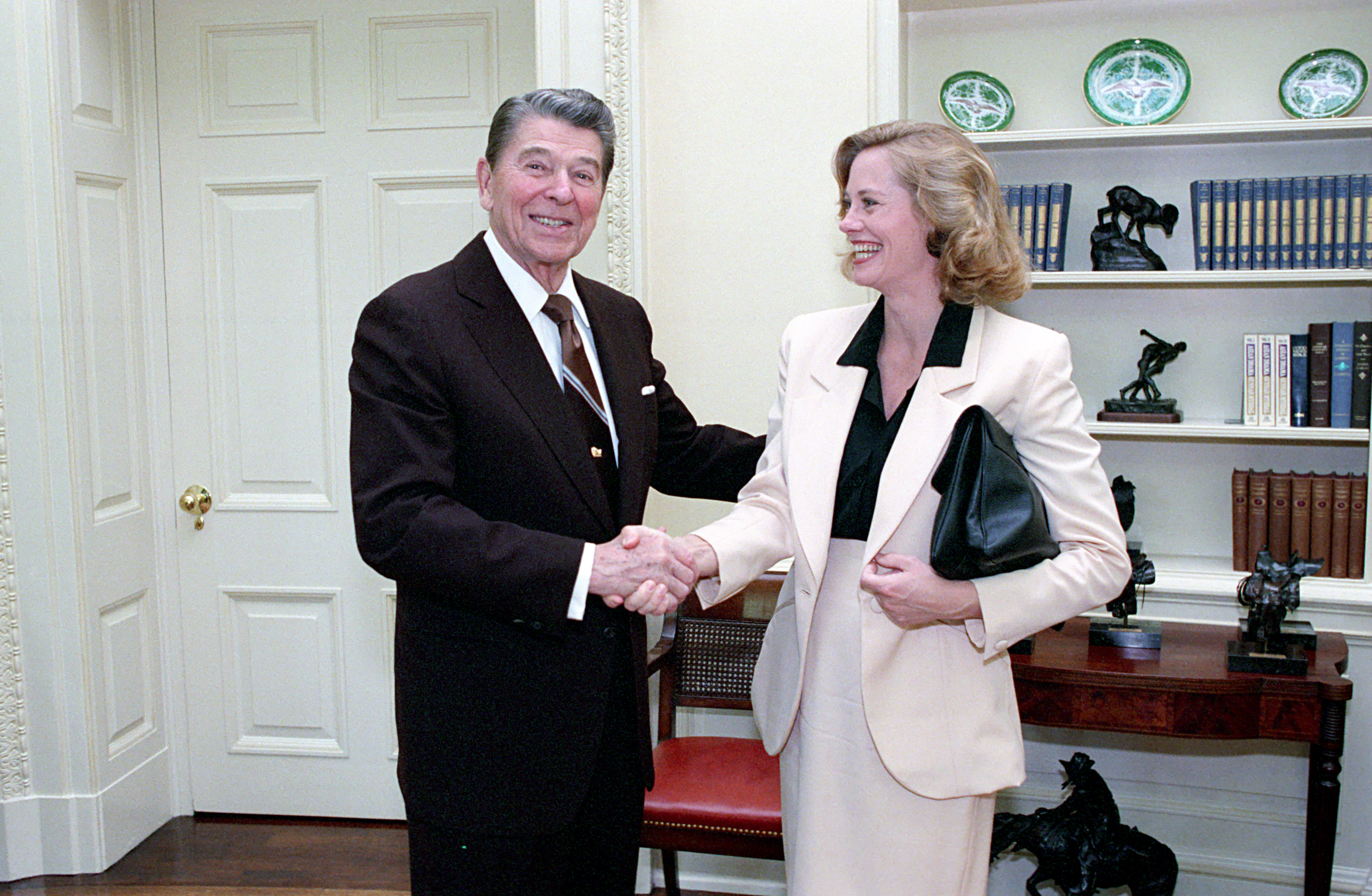
Shepherd with President Ronald Reagan in 1988

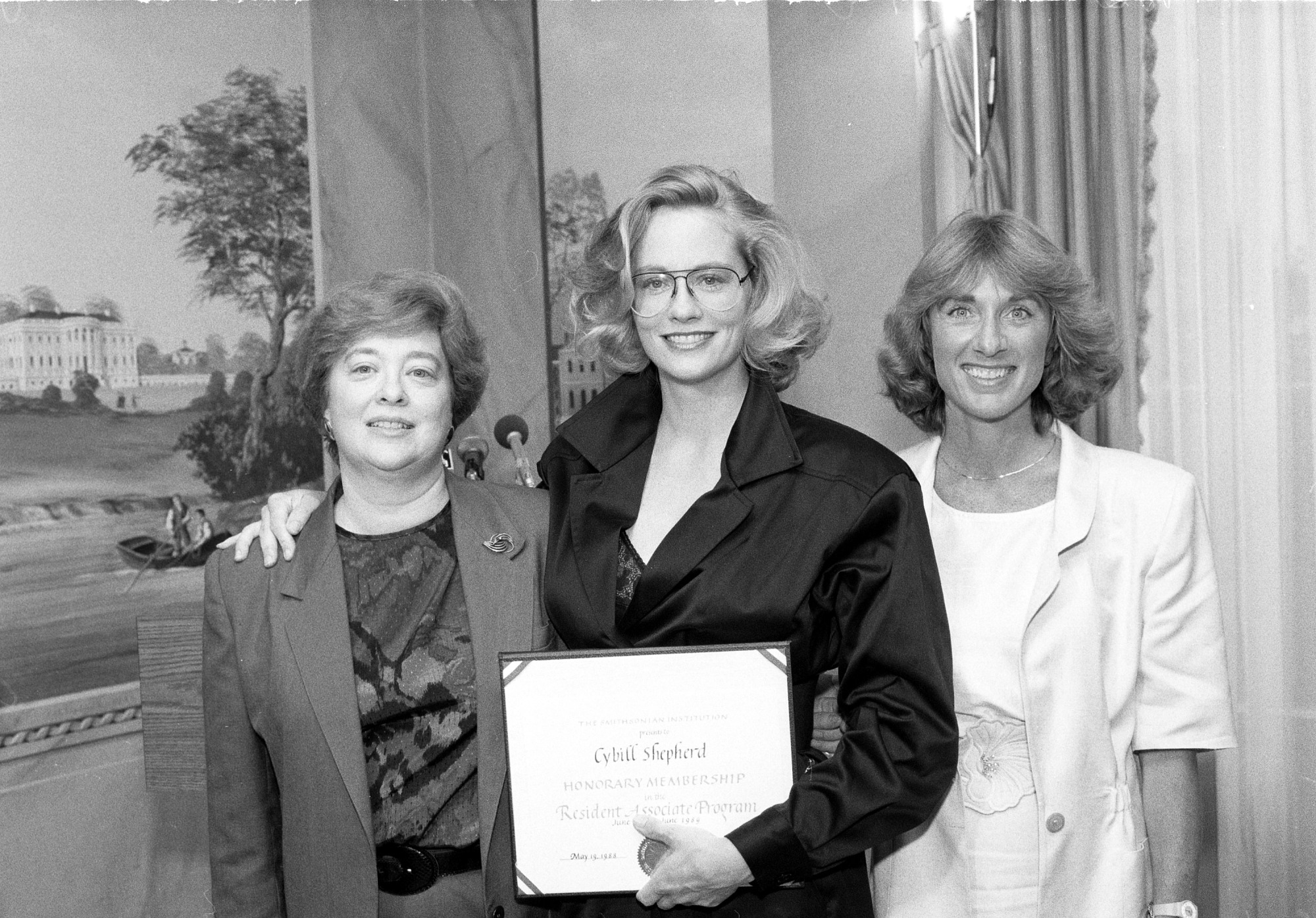
Cybill Shepherd inside the "Smithsonian Castle" during the filming of Chances Are, where she plays a Smithsonian curator. She is presented with an honorary Resident Associate Program membership, by (l.) National Museum of American History (NMAH) Curator Edith Mayo and NMAH Director of External Affairs, Marilyn Lyons (1989)

Throughout her career, Shepherd has been an activist for issues such as gay rights and abortion rights. In 2009, she was honored by the Human Rights Campaign in Atlanta with one of two National Ally for Equality awards. She has been an advocate for same-sex marriage.

She was present at the opening of the National Civil Rights Museum in her hometown of Memphis, to which she lent financial support.

=== Religious beliefs ===
Shepherd was raised Christian, but stated that she eventually "lost touch" with the religion. In a 2007 interview with Metro Weekly, she described herself as being "a goddess-worshipping Pagan Buddhist".

In October 2014, Shepherd said that she had reconnected with her Christian faith.

== Filmography ==
=== Film ===
Year	Title	Role	Notes
1971	The Last Picture Show	Jacy Farrow	Nominated—Golden Globe Award for New Star of the Year – Actress
1972	The Heartbreak Kid	Kelly Corcoran	
1974	Daisy Miller	Annie P. 'Daisy' Miller	
1975	At Long Last Love	Brooke Carter	
1976	Taxi Driver	Betsy	
1976	Special Delivery	Mary Jane	
1977	Aliens from Spaceship Earth	Herself	Documentary
1978	Silver Bears	Debbie Luckman	
1979	The Lady Vanishes	Amanda Kelly	
1979	Americathon	Gold Girl	
1980	The Return	Jennifer	
1989	Chances Are	Corinne Jeffries	
1990	Texasville	Jacy Farrow	
1990	Alice	Nancy Brill	
1991	Picture This: The Times of Peter Bogdanovich	Herself	Documentary
1991	Married to It	Claire Laurent	
1992	Once Upon a Crime...	Marilyn Schwary	
1995	The Last Word	Kiki Taylor	
1999	The Muse	Herself	
2000	Marine Life	June	
2003	Easy Riders, Raging Bulls	Herself	
2004	Signs and Voices	Herself	
2006	Open Window	Arlene Fieldson	
2006	Hard Luck	Cass	
2009	Barry Munday	Herself	
2009	Another Harvest Moon	Vickie	
2009	Listen to Your Heart	Victoria	
2010	Expecting Mary	Meg	
2014	Kelly & Cal	Bev	
2015	Do You Believe?	Teri	
2015	She's Funny That Way	Nettie Patterson	
2017	Being Rose	Rose	
2020	Love Is Love Is Love	Nancy	

=== Television ===
Year	Title	Role	Notes
1978	A Guide for the Married Woman	Julie Walker	Television movie
1983	Fantasy Island	Liz	Episode: "Return to the Cotton Club"
1983–84	The Yellow Rose	Colleen Champion	22 episodes
1983	Masquerade	Carla	Episode: "Pilot"
1984	Secrets of a Married Man	Elaine	Television movie
1985	Seduced	Vicki Orloff	Television movie
1985	The Long Hot Summer	Eula Varner	Television movie
1985–89	Moonlighting	Madelyn 'Maddie' Hayes	64 episodes Golden Globe Award for Best Actress – Television Series Musical or Comedy (1986–1987); People's Choice Award for Favorite Female Performer in a Television Series (1986–1988); Nominated—Golden Globe Award for Best Actress – Television Series Musical or Comedy; Nominated—Primetime Emmy Award for Outstanding Lead Actress in a Drama Series
1991	Which Way Home	Karen Parsons	Television movie
1992	Memphis	Reeny Perdew	Television movie
1992	Stormy Weathers	Samantha Weathers	Television movie
1993	Telling Secrets	Faith Kelsey	Television movie
1993	There Was a Little Boy	Julie Warner	Television movie
1994	Baby Brokers	Debbie Freeman	Television movie
1994	While Justice Sleeps	Jody Stokes	Television movie
1995–98	Cybill	Cybill Sheridan	87 episodes Golden Globe Award for Best Actress – Television Series Musical or Comedy; Nominated—Golden Globe Award for Best Actress – Television Series Musical or Comedy; Nominated—People's Choice Award for Favorite Female Performer in a Television Series; Nominated—Primetime Emmy Award for Outstanding Lead Actress in a Comedy Series (1995–1997); Nominated—Satellite Award for Best Actress – Television Series Musical or Comedy; Nominated—Screen Actors Guild Award for Outstanding Performance by an Ensemble in a Comedy Series
1997	Journey of the Heart	Janice Johnston	Television movie
2002	Due East	Nell Dugan	Television movie
2003	8 Simple Rules	Aunt Maggie	2 episodes
2003	Martha, Inc.: The Story of Martha Stewart	Martha Stewart	Television movie
2004	I'm With Her	Suzanne	2 episodes
2005	Detective	Karen Ainslie	Television movie
2005	Martha: Behind Bars	Martha Stewart	Television movie
2007–09	The L Word	Phyllis Kroll	18 episodes
2008–13	Psych	Madeline Spencer	5 episodes
2008	Samantha Who?	Paula Drake	Episode: "So I Think I Can Dance"
2009	Criminal Minds	Leona Gless	Episode: "Cold Comfort"
2009–10	Eastwick	Eleanor Rougement	5 episodes
2009	High Noon	Essie McNamara	Television movie
2009	Mrs. Washington Goes to Smith	Alice Washington	Television movie
2010	Drop Dead Diva	Ellie Tannen	Episode: "Queen of Mean"
2010	$♯*! My Dad Says	Charlotte Anne Robinson	Episode: "Make a Wish"
2010	No Ordinary Family	Barbara Crane	Episode: "No Ordinary Visitors"
2010	The Client List	Cassie	Television movie
2012–13	The Client List	Linette Montgomery	23 episodes
2012	Hot in Cleveland	April	Episode: "What's Behind the Door"
2012	Franklin and Bash	Evanthia Steele	Episode: "Jango and Rossi"
2013	Law & Order: Special Victims Unit	Jolene Castille	Episode: "American Tragedy"
2018	The Comedy Central Roast	Herself	Episode: "Bruce Willis"
2021	Guilty Party	Susan Burgess	Episode: "Acts of Devotion"
2023	How to Murder Your Husband: The Nancy Brophy Story	Nancy Brophy	Television movie

== Discography ==
- Cybill Does It...To Cole Porter (Paramount, 1974)
- Mad About the Boy (Tombstone, 1976) - Cybill Getz Better (Reissue title)
- Vanilla (Gold Castle, 1979)
- Somewhere Down the Road (Gold Castle, 1990)
- Talk Memphis to Me (Drive Archive, 1997)
- Songs from The Cybill Show (1999)
- Live at the Cinegrill (2001)
- At Home With Cybill (2004)
- Jazz Baby Volumes 1–3 (2005)

=== Appearances ===
- At Long Last Love (soundtrack) (1975)
- Moonlighting (soundtrack) (1987)

== Awards and nominations ==
=== Emmy Awards ===
Nominations:

- 1986 - Outstanding Lead Actress - Drama Series - Moonlighting
- 1995 - Outstanding Lead Actress - Comedy Series - Cybill
- 1996 - Outstanding Lead Actress - Comedy Series - Cybill
- 1997 - Outstanding Lead Actress - Comedy Series - Cybill

In her autobiography, Shepherd addressed rumors that she was jealous of her co-stars Bruce Willis and Christine Baranski for winning Emmy awards while she has not: "The grain of truth in this controversy was that of course I was envious. Who doesn't want to win an Emmy?"

=== Golden Globe Awards ===
Wins:

- 1985 - Best Actress in a Television Series - Musical or Comedy - Moonlighting
- 1986 - Best Actress in a Television Series - Musical or Comedy - Moonlighting
- 1995 - Best Actress in a Television Series - Musical or Comedy - Cybill

Nominations:

- 1971 - Most Promising Newcomer (Female) - The Last Picture Show
- 1987 - Best Actress in a Television Series - Musical or Comedy - Moonlighting
- 1996 - Best Actress in a Television Series - Musical or Comedy - Cybill
