= ImClone Systems =

Biopharmaceutical company

ImClone LLC
- Type: Subsidiary
- Traded as: Nasdaq: IMCL
- Industry: Biotechnology company; Pharmaceutical industry
- Founded: 1984; 42 years ago
- Number of employees: 1,128
- Parent: Eli Lilly and Company
- Website: www.imclone.com

ImClone Systems LLC was a biopharmaceutical company dedicated to developing biologic medicines in the area of oncology. It was founded in 1984 and had its corporate headquarters in Bridgewater, New Jersey, and its research headquarters in New York City. On October 6, 2008, it accepted a $6.5 billion acquisition offer from Eli Lilly and Company, and became a fully owned subsidiary of Eli Lilly and Company on November 24, 2008. Prior to the acquisition, it was traded on the NASDAQ stock exchange under the symbol IMCL. Imclone lost its separate identity in 2014 when its former ImClone research and manufacturing sites were renamed as Eli Lilly and Company.

== Insider trading scandal ==
ImClone's stock price dropped sharply at the end of 2001 when its drug Erbitux, an experimental monoclonal antibody, failed to get the expected Food and Drug Administration (FDA) approval. It was later revealed by the U.S. Securities and Exchange Commission that numerous executives sold their stock before the announcement of the decision after the close of trading on December 28.

Its founder, Samuel D. Waksal, was arrested in 2002 on insider trading charges for informing friends and family to sell their stock, and attempting to sell his own. His daughter, Aliza Waksal, sold $2.5 million in shares on December 27. His father, Jack Waksal, sold $8.1 million in shares over the 27th and 28th. Company executives had done the same. John B. Landes, the general counsel, sold $2.5 million in shares on December 6. Ronald A. Martell, the vice president for marketing and sales, sold $2.1 million in shares on December 11. Four other executives sold shares in the following weeks as well. Later, Samuel Waksal pleaded guilty to various charges, including securities fraud, and on June 10, 2003, was sentenced to seven years and three months in prison.

Martha Stewart, the founder of Martha Stewart Living Omnimedia (Waksal had dated Stewart's daughter) also became embroiled in the scandal after it emerged that she sold about $230,000 in ImClone shares on December 27, just a day before the announcement of FDA decision. Although Stewart maintained her innocence, she was found guilty and sentenced on July 16, 2004, to five months in prison, five months of home confinement, and two years probation for lying about a stock sale, conspiracy, and obstruction of justice.

Ultimately a new clinical trial and FDA filing prepared by Imclone's partner Merck KGaA ("German Merck," not to be confused with the US company of similar name) resulted in an FDA approval of Erbitux in 2004 for use in colon cancer.

A Congressional hearing on improprieties at ImClone, held in October 2002, unveiled a culture of corruption dating back to 1986. This was the year that ImClone CEO Waksal first forged the signature of the company's general counsel John Landes (one of the three original employees of the company) for financial gain. Nonetheless, Landes defended Waksal's illegal actions at the hearings before the Subcommittee on Oversight and Investigations, portraying the forgery as "a good-faith misunderstanding," to which Representative James Greenwood replied "My children know better than that, Mr. Landes." Further questioning about this and subsequent forgeries on Waksal's part revealed that neither Landes, the chief legal officer of the company, nor the company's outside directors reported Waksal's actions to proper authorities or made any moves to have Waksal removed as CEO. Instead, testimony revealed that they initiated their own internal investigation, which was never concluded. The decades-long tolerance for Waksal's fraud, starting from the company's earliest days, provoked Representative Peter Deutsch to refer to the ongoing misconduct as "wacky."

The FDA's February 2004 announcement of approval for use of Erbitux for treatment of colorectal cancer reported that conclusions were drawn from a trial involving 329 patients, of which 10.8% responded when Erbitux was used by itself, delaying tumor growth by 1.5 months. When used in conjunction with a standard chemotherapy treatment, irinotecan, 22.9% of patients responded and tumor growth was delayed by approximately 4.1 months.

In September 2001, Bristol-Myers Squibb committed $2 billion (including a $1 billion up-front cash payment) for less than 20% of ImClone due to what was called at the time the drug's "blockbuster" potential.

In January 2006, the company was put up for sale but failed to find any buyers, likely due to the fact that Erbitux by that time faced significant competition in the medical marketplace. ImClone directors withdrew the sale of the company in mid-2006.

In April 2007, The Wall Street Journal reported that "Bristol-Myers Squibb Co. and ImClone Systems Inc. said their cancer drug, Erbitux, failed to significantly prolong the lives of people with pancreatic cancer in a new study, marking yet another setback in the drug industry's efforts to find a better treatment for this deadly disease."

== Compassionate use controversy ==
The FDA approved the aforementioned colorectal cancer drug, Erbitux, on February 12, 2004. In May 2001, while ImClone was still seeking approval for the drug (then known as IMC-C225), the CBS news program "60 Minutes" aired a story about two cancer patients' struggles to obtain "compassionate use" of the drug. One ultimately succeeded; the other failed despite repeated pleas to ImClone officials. It was alleged in the story that ImClone was arbitrary in who received the drug and had no written criteria for compassionate use.

== Carl Icahn acquisition ==
On October 25, 2006, a group led by billionaire investor Carl Icahn acquired a majority of stock thereby giving him control of the board. Within hours of the announcement, interim CEO Joseph Fischer resigned, and Icahn announced that other members of the Board of Directors would not be re-elected.

== Yeda/Aventis/Imclone patent dispute ==
Yeda Research and Development, a company set up to commercialize and market the products of research at the Weizmann Institute of Science in Israel, challenged the Aventis-owned patent, licensed by Imclone, for the use of anti-Epidermal growth factor receptor antibodies in combination with chemotherapy, to slow the growth of certain tumors. This is the so-called '866' patent, which was filed in 1989 by Rhone-Poulenc-Rorer, issued in 2001, and on which Joseph Schlessinger was listed as first-named inventor.

Joseph Schlessinger's former colleagues at the Weizmann Institute, in particular Michael Sela, claimed to have come up with this concept alongside Schlessinger when they worked together there years earlier, and Yeda challenged the Aventis patent in the United States. Schlessinger testified in court that the idea of combining the anti-EGFR antibody that his lab had developed with chemotherapy in cancer treatment was his own idea. However, the Weizmann Institute scientists provided extensive documentation that they had been developing this idea using an antibody against EGFR that Schlessinger's laboratory had developed and generated, and that he had given them for these studies. Schlessinger claims to have initiated the idea of this use in combination therapy, but had not documented his research and ideas as thoroughly, leaving him forced to rely on his recollections of the events that led to the patent filing some 17 years before Yeda mounted their challenge.

The court ruled that Yeda are the sole owners of the disputed patent in the U.S., while Yeda and Sanofi-Aventis co-own the 866 Patent's foreign counterparts. Following the ruling, ImClone and Sanofi-Aventis agreed to settle the dispute with Yeda, for $120 million, with each company paying Yeda $60 million. In return, ImClone were also granted a worldwide license to technology covered by the 866 Patent, and agreed to pay a small royalty on Erbitux sales to Yeda.

== Takeover offer from Bristol-Myers Squibb, and subsequent bidding showdown ==
On July 31, 2008, Bristol-Myers Squibb offered to take over ImClone for $60 a share cash. The offer was made by letter addressed to ImClone's chairman of the board, Carl Icahn.

On September 10, 2008, an undisclosed company and CEO offered to take over ImClone for $70 a share, financing approach was not disclosed. The offer was conditional on the results of a due diligence review of ImClone's business and technology by the undisclosed party, to be completed September 28, 2008.

On September 23, 2008, Bristol-Myers Squibb upped its offer to take over ImClone to $62 a share. In addition, Bristol threatened to take the offer to the share holders for a proxy battle with the intention of replacing the current Board of Directors headed by Carl Icahn.

On October 6, 2008, ImClone agreed to be acquired by Eli Lilly for $6.5 billion ($70/share). On November 24, 2008, ImClone was formally acquired by Eli Lilly, with all NASDAQ IMCL shares tendered for $6.5 billion ($70/share). ImClone is now a fully owned subsidiary of Eli Lilly and Company. In 2014 a drug developed by ImClone, tumor angiogenesis inhibitor Cyramza, was approved by the FDA for gastric cancer. Lilly acquired the drug through its purchase of ImClone.

== See also ==
- Accounting scandals
- Corporate abuse
