= This Machine Filmworks =

American film production company

- Industry: Motion pictures; Entertainment
- Founded: 2020; 6 years ago
- Founders: R.J. Cutler
- Key people: R.J. Cutler (President); Elise Pearlstein (Executive Vice President); Trevor Smith (Executive Vice President); Mark Blatty (Executive Vice President / Chief Operating Officer)
- Products: Films; Television films; Television shows
- Parent: Sony Pictures Television Nonfiction
- Website: thismachine.net

This Machine Filmworks is an American film and television production company specializing in documentary features and nonfiction series. The company was founded in 2020 by filmmaker R. J. Cutler with backing from Industrial Media. The company's founding team included Emmy-winning producer Trevor Smith and Academy Award–nominated documentary producer Elise Pearlstein, who joined as Executive Vice President of Documentaries.

== History ==
This Machine's early productions included Belushi for Showtime, which was nominated for three Critics Choice Documentary Awards. and Billie Eilish: The World's a Little Blurry for Apple TV+, the latter receiving multiple Emmy nominations and being shortlisted for the Academy Award for Best Documentary Feature.

== Sony Pictures Television Nonfiction ==
In 2022, Industrial Media was acquired by Sony Pictures Television, bringing This Machine into Sony's nonfiction portfolio. That year, the company produced the docuseries Supreme Models through YouTube Originals. In 2025, the series became available for streaming on Netflix.

This Machine's 2023 releases included Anthem, South to Black Power, Murf the Surf, and the Netflix series Big Vape: The Rise and Fall of Juul, which won the News & Documentary Emmy Award for Outstanding Business and Economic Documentary.

Also in 2023, the company released The Disappearance of Shere Hite, which premiered at the Sundance Film Festival and received critical recognition, including placement on the Cinema Eye Honors “Unforgettables” list. The film also holds a 100% approval rating on Rotten Tomatoes, based on 61 critic reviews.

== Recent productions ==
In 2024, the company released Elton John: Never Too Late, featuring the Oscar-nominated song “Never Too Late”, as well as Martha on Netflix, which earned two Emmy nominations (Outstanding Documentary, Writing), a WGA Award nomination, and won the Middleburg Film Festival Audience Award.

In 2025, This Machine produced Karol G: Tomorrow Was Beautiful about the Colombian pop artist Karol G on Netflix and Lee Soo Man: The King of K-Pop, about Lee Soo-man, the SM Entertainment founder, released through Prime Video.

In 2026, This Machine released Marc by Sofia, a feature documentary about Marc Jacobs directed by Sofia Coppola, which premiered at the Venice Film Festival. The company also produced BTS: The Return, which follows K-pop group BTS during the making of their album Airang and premiered on Netflix on March 27, 2026.

== Filmography ==
=== Films ===
Year	Title	Distributor	Awards
2020	Belushi	Showtime	Critics Choice Documentary Awards for Best Historical/Biographical Documentary (N), Best Documentary Feature (N), Best Archival Documentary (N)
2021	Billie Eilish: The World's a Little Blurry	Apple TV+	Academy Award Shortlist, BAFTA Longlist, Grierson Shortlist, Cinema Eye Honors (N), Critics’ Choice (N)
2023	Anthem	Hulu	
2023	South to Black Power	HBO	
2023	The Disappearance of Shere Hite	Showtime	Cinema Eye Honoree (N)
2024	Elton John: Never Too Late	Disney+	Academy Award Best Song (N), BAFTA Longlist, Grammy (N), Hollywood Music In Media Awards (W)
2024	Martha	Netflix	Emmy Best Doc (N), Emmy Writing (N), WGA (N), Grierson Shortlist
2025	Karol G: Tomorrow Was Beautiful	Netflix	Hollywood Music In Media Award (N)
2025	Lee Soo Man: The King of K-Pop	Amazon Prime Video	
2026	Marc by Sofia	A24	
2026	BTS: The Return	Netflix	

=== Television series ===
Years	Title	Network	Awards
2019	Dear...	Apple TV+	Imagen (W), Critics Choice Real TV (N)
2022	Supreme Models	YouTube Originals	Telly Award (Silver) (W)
2023	Murf the Surf	MGM+	MovieGuide Awards (N)
2023	Big Vape: The Rise and Fall of Juul	Netflix	Emmy Award for Outstanding Business & Economic Documentary (W); Critics’ Choice Documentary Awards (N); RealScreen Awards (N)
2024	Fight for Glory: 2024 World Series	Apple TV+	
2025–present	Esports World Cup: Level Up	Amazon Prime Video	
Coming 2026	New Wave	MGM+	
