= Martha Stewart =

American businesswoman, writer, TV personality (born 1941)

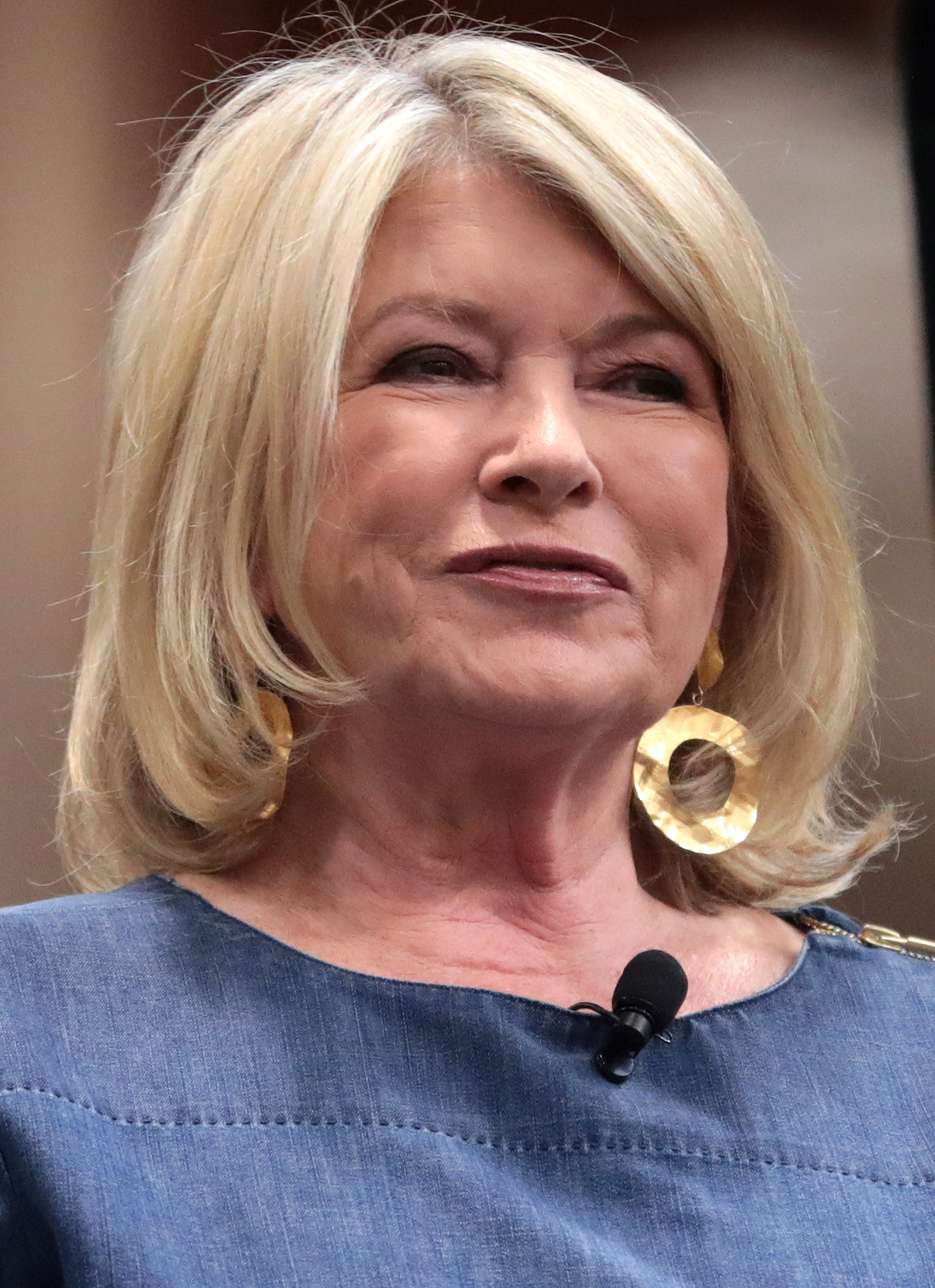
- Stewart in 2019
- Born: Martha Helen Kostyra; August 3, 1941 (age 85); Jersey City, New Jersey, U.S.
- Education: Barnard College (BA)
- Occupations: Businesswoman; writer; television personality
- Spouse: Andrew Stewart (m. 1961; div. 1990)
- Children: Alexis Stewart
- Website: www.marthastewart.com

Martha Helen Stewart (née Kostyra, Polish: [kɔˈstɨra]; born August 3, 1941) is an American retail businesswoman, writer, and television personality. As the founder of Martha Stewart Living Omnimedia, focusing on home and hospitality, she gained success through a variety of business ventures, encompassing publishing, broadcasting, merchandising and e-commerce. She has written numerous bestselling books, was the publisher of Martha Stewart Living magazine and hosted two syndicated television programs: Martha Stewart Living, which ran from 1993 to 2004, and The Martha Stewart Show, which ran from 2005 to 2012.

Stewart was convicted of felony charges related to the ImClone stock trading case; she served five months in federal prison for fraud and was released in March 2005. There was speculation that the incident would effectively end her media empire, but in 2005, Stewart began a comeback campaign, and her company returned to profitability in 2006. Stewart rejoined the board of directors of Martha Stewart Living Omnimedia in 2011 and became chairwoman of her namesake company again in 2012. The company was acquired by Sequential Brands in 2015. Sequential Brands Group agreed in April 2019 to sell Martha Stewart Living Omnimedia, including the Emeril brand, to Marquee Brands for $175 million with benchmarked additional payments.

In 2023, at the age of 81, Stewart became the oldest woman to appear on the cover of Sports Illustrated Swimsuit Issue magazine. In 2024, she was the subject of a Netflix documentary titled Martha, directed by R. J. Cutler.

== Early life ==
Martha Stewart was born in Jersey City, New Jersey, on August 3, 1941. She is the second of six children born to parents Martha (née Ruszkowski; 1914–2007) and Edward Kostyra (1912–1979) and is of Polish heritage. Her parents were teachers, with her father later becoming a pharmaceutical salesman. When Stewart was three years old, the family moved to Nutley, New Jersey. She adopted the name "Grace" at her Catholic confirmation.

When Stewart was 10, she worked as the occasional babysitter for the children of Mickey Mantle, Yogi Berra, and Gil McDougald, all players for the New York Yankees. Mickey and Merlyn Mantle had four sons, whom Stewart watched and for whom she organized birthday parties. She also began modeling. At 15, Stewart was featured in a television commercial for Unilever. She went on to appear in television commercials and in magazines, including one of Tareyton's "Smokers would rather fight than switch!" cigarette advertisements. During her college years, she supplemented her scholarship money through "modeling jobs at $15/hour — which was a lot of money at that time." Among the companies she modeled for was Chanel.

Stewart's mother taught her how to cook and sew. Later, she learned the processes of canning and preserving when she visited her grandparents' home in Buffalo, New York. Her father had a passion for gardening and passed on much of his knowledge and expertise to his daughter. Stewart was also active in many extracurricular activities, such as the school's newspaper and art club.

Stewart graduated from Nutley High School. She attended Barnard College of Columbia University, originally planning to major in chemistry, but switching to art, history, and later architectural history. To help pay her college tuition, she did fashion modeling for Chanel. During this time, she met Andrew Stewart, who finished his law degree at Yale Law School. They married in July 1961. She returned to Barnard a year after their wedding to graduate with a double major in history and architectural history.

== Career ==
In 1967, Martha Stewart began a second career as a stockbroker, her father-in-law's profession. Meanwhile, Andrew Stewart founded a publishing house and was chief executive of several others. Andrew and Martha Stewart moved to Westport, Connecticut, where they purchased and restored the 1805 farmhouse on Turkey Hill Road that would later become the model for the TV studio of Martha Stewart Living. During the project, Stewart's panache for restoring and decorating became apparent.

In 1976, Stewart started a catering business in her basement with a friend from her modeling days, Norma Collier. The venture quickly became successful but soured when Collier alleged that Stewart was difficult to work with, and was also taking catering jobs on the side. Stewart soon bought Collier's portion of the business. Stewart was also hired as the manager of a gourmet food store, the Market Basket, but after a disagreement with the owners at the mini-mall she was forced out and opened her own store.

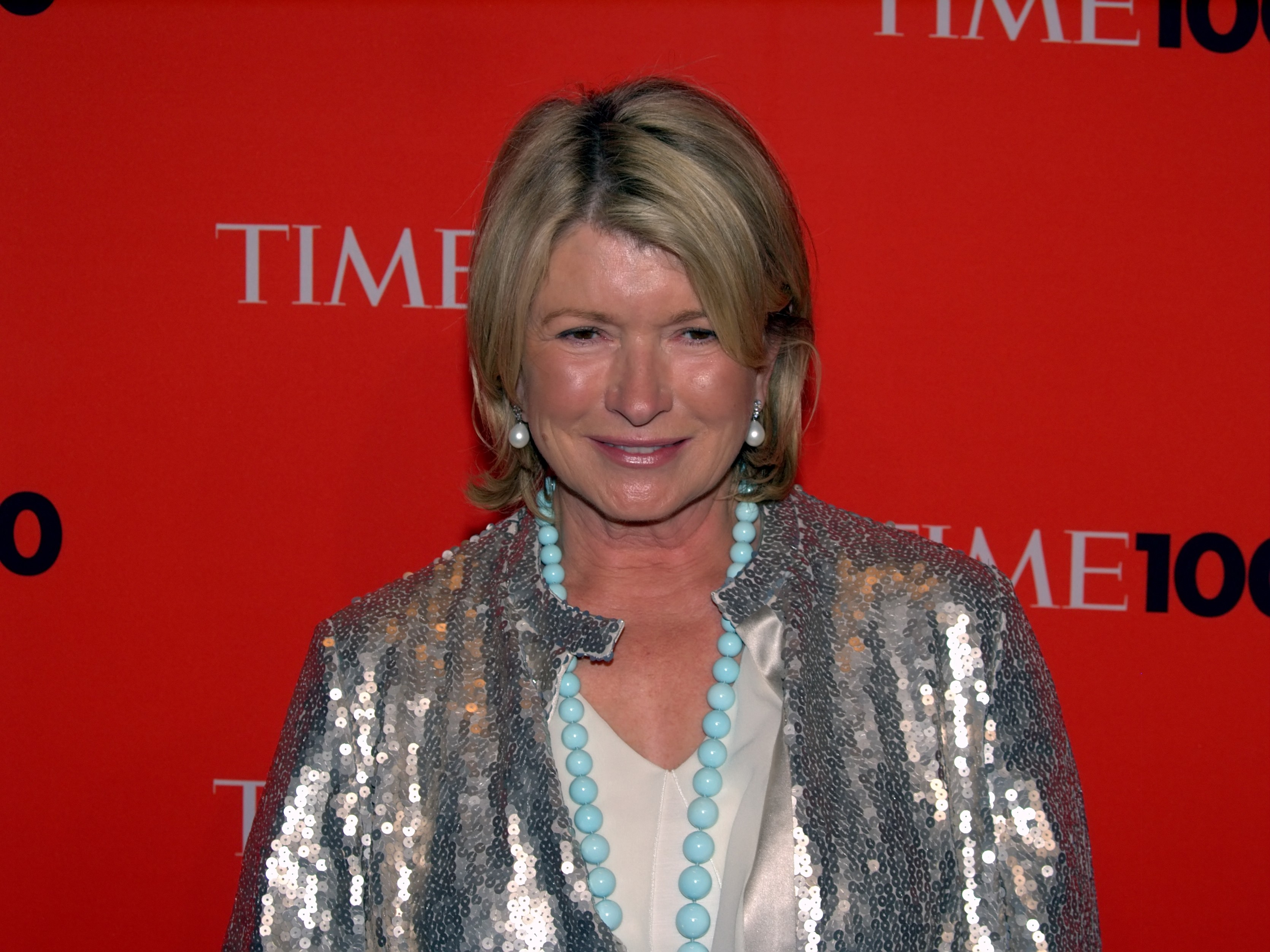
Stewart at the Time 100 Gala in 2010.

Andrew had become the president of prominent New York City publisher Harry N. Abrams, Inc. In 1977, he was responsible for releasing the English-language edition of The Secret Book of Gnomes series, by Dutch authors Wil Huygen and Rien Poortvliet, which quickly became a blockbuster success and was on The New York Times Best Seller list. He contracted Stewart's company to cater the book release party, where Stewart was introduced to Alan Mirken, head of Crown Publishing Group. Mirken was impressed by Stewart's talent as a chef and hostess and later contacted her to develop a cookbook, featuring recipes and photos from the parties that Stewart hosted. The result was her first book, Entertaining (December 13, 1982), ghostwritten by Elizabeth Hawes.

Following the success of Entertaining, Stewart released many more books under the Clarkson Potter publishing imprint, including Martha Stewart's Quick Cook (1983), Martha Stewart's Hors d'Oeuvres (1984), Martha Stewart's Pies & Tarts (1985), Weddings (1987) (which was also ghostwritten by Elizabeth Hawes), The Wedding Planner (1988), Martha Stewart's Secrets for Entertaining (1988), Martha Stewart's Quick Cook Menus (1988), and Martha Stewart's Christmas (1989), among others. During this time, she also authored dozens of newspaper columns, magazine articles, and other pieces on homemaking, and made numerous television appearances on programs such as The Oprah Winfrey Show and Larry King Live.

Andrew and Martha Stewart separated in 1987 and divorced in 1990.

=== Later career ===
In 1990, Stewart signed with Time Publishing Ventures to develop a new magazine, Martha Stewart Living, for which Stewart was editor-in-chief. The first issue was released in late 1990 with an initial rate base of 250,000. Circulation would peak in 2002 at more than 2 million copies per issue.

In 1993, Stewart began a weekly half-hour television program, also called Martha Stewart Living, based on her magazine. The show expanded to weekdays in 1997 and later to a full hour show in 1999 with half-hour episodes on weekends, and ran until 2004. Stewart also became a frequent contributor to NBC's Today Show and later to CBS's The Early Show, and starred in several prime time holiday specials on the CBS network.

On the cover of their May 1995 issue, New York Magazine declared Stewart "the definitive American woman of our time".

In 2019, it was reported that Stewart was entering the cannabis industry with her own brand.

=== Martha Stewart Living Omnimedia ===
In September 1997, with the assistance of business partner Sharon Patrick, Stewart was able to secure funding to purchase the various television, print, and merchandising ventures related to the Martha Stewart brand, and consolidate them into a new company, named Martha Stewart Living Omnimedia (MSLO). Stewart was chairwoman, president, and CEO of the new company and Patrick became Chief Operations Officer. By organizing all of the brand's assets under one roof, Stewart thought she could promote synergy and have greater control of the brand's direction through the business's activities. That same month, Stewart announced in Martha Stewart Living the launch of a companion website and a catalogue business, called Martha by Mail. The company also had a direct-to-consumer floral business.

On October 19, 1999, Martha Stewart Living Omnimedia went public on the New York Stock Exchange under the ticker symbol MSO. The initial public offering was set at US$18 per share (equivalent to $35 in 2025), and rallied to US$38 (equivalent to $73 in 2025) by the end of trading, making Stewart a billionaire on paper and the first female self-made billionaire in the United States. The stock price slowly went down to $16 per share by February 2002. Stewart was then and continues to be the majority shareholder, commanding 96% control of voting power in the company.

== Stock trading case and conviction ==
According to the U.S. Securities and Exchange Commission (SEC), Stewart avoided a loss of $45,673 by selling all 3,928 shares of her ImClone Systems stock on December 27, 2001, after receiving material, nonpublic information from Peter Bacanovic, her broker at Merrill Lynch. The day following her sale, the stock value fell 16%.

In the months that followed, Stewart drew heavy media scrutiny, including a Newsweek cover headlined "Martha's Mess". Notably, on June 25, 2002, CBS anchor Jane Clayson grilled Stewart on the air about ImClone during her regular segment on The Early Show. Stewart continued chopping cabbage and responded: "I want to focus on my salad." On October 3, 2002, Stewart resigned her position, held for four months, on the board of directors of the New York Stock Exchange, following a deal prosecutors had made with Douglas Faneuil, an assistant to Bacanovic.

On June 4, 2003, Stewart was indicted by a grand jury on nine counts, including charges of obstruction of justice. Stewart stepped down as CEO and Chairwoman of MSLO but stayed on as chief creative officer. She went on trial in January 2004. Prosecutors showed that Bacanovic had ordered his assistant to tell Stewart that the CEO of ImClone, Samuel D. Waksal, was selling all his shares in advance of an adverse Food and Drug Administration ruling. The FDA action was expected to cause ImClone shares to decline.

Monica Beam, a shareholder of MSLO, also brought a derivative suit against Stewart and other directors and officers of the company. It went before the Supreme Court of Delaware in 2004 and was ultimately dismissed.

=== Sentence ===
After a highly publicized six-week jury trial, Stewart was found guilty in March 2004 of felony charges of conspiracy to obstruct, of obstruction of an agency proceeding, and of making false statements to federal investigators and was sentenced in July 2004 to serve a five-month term in a federal correctional facility and a two-year period of supervised release (including five months of electronic monitoring).

Bacanovic and Waksal were also convicted of federal charges and sentenced to prison terms. Stewart also paid a fine of $30,000. The lead prosecutor of Stewart was James Comey.

In August 2006, the SEC announced that it had agreed to settle the related civil case against Stewart. Under the settlement, Stewart agreed to disgorge $58,062 (including interest from the losses she avoided), as well as a civil penalty of three times the loss avoided, or $137,019. She also agreed to a five-year ban from being a director, CEO, CFO, or any other officer role responsible for preparing, auditing, or disclosing financial results of any public company. In June 2008, the UK Border Agency refused to grant her a visa to enter the United Kingdom because of her criminal conviction for obstructing justice. She had been planning to speak at the Royal Academy on fashion and leisure industry matters.

=== Incarceration ===
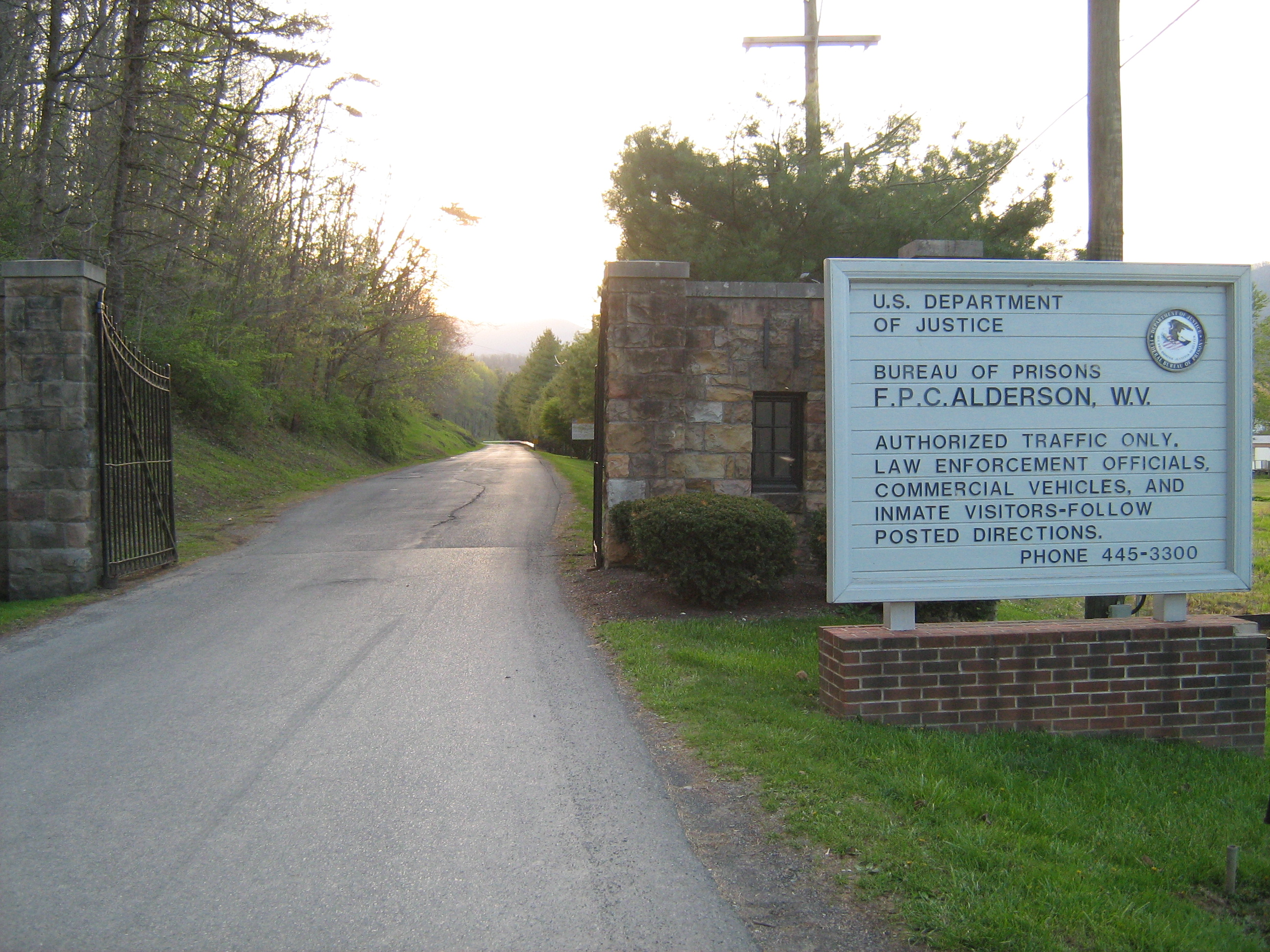
Federal Prison Camp, Alderson, where Stewart was confined

Despite Stewart's wish to be incarcerated in Connecticut or Florida, she was confined in Federal Prison Camp in Alderson, West Virginia. In 2004, her lawyer said that the remoteness would make it difficult for her then-90-year-old mother to visit. Judge Miriam Goldman Cedarbaum recommended to the Federal Bureau of Prisons (BOP) that Stewart be given her first choice, Federal Correctional Institution, Danbury, or her second choice, Federal Correctional Complex, Coleman. However, a spokesperson for the U.S. Department of Justice said the BOP would not send her to FCI Danbury, because the news media could access the facility too easily. The bureau could not send Stewart to FCC Coleman because of complications from Hurricane Ivan: the Coleman complex had been filled with inmates from Federal Correctional Institution, Marianna. Therefore, the Federal Bureau of Prisons assigned Stewart to Alderson. The spokesperson said he was concerned the assignment to Alderson could be perceived as being vindictive. Stewart's daughter, Alexis, said she believed the BOP "may have made a point of sending her far away."

Stewart reported to FPC Alderson for her prison sentence on October 8, 2004. While in confinement, she took a job and became an informal liaison between the administration and her fellow inmates. The People special Scandals! That Rocked America stated, "Some expected America's goddess of domestic perfection to fall into terminal despair." Stewart was released from FPC Alderson at 12:30 AM on March 4, 2005. She was placed in a two-year term of supervised release; during five of those months, she was placed in home confinement with electronic monitoring. Stewart served her home confinement at her residence in Bedford, New York. She was allowed to leave her house for 48 hours per week for work-related visits. After her home confinement ended, but while her supervised release continued, she was required to remain employed and not to associate with people with criminal records. In addition, during the supervised release, she was required to receive permission from federal officials if she was going to leave the jurisdiction of the United States District Court for the Southern District of New York.

== Post-conviction and current projects ==
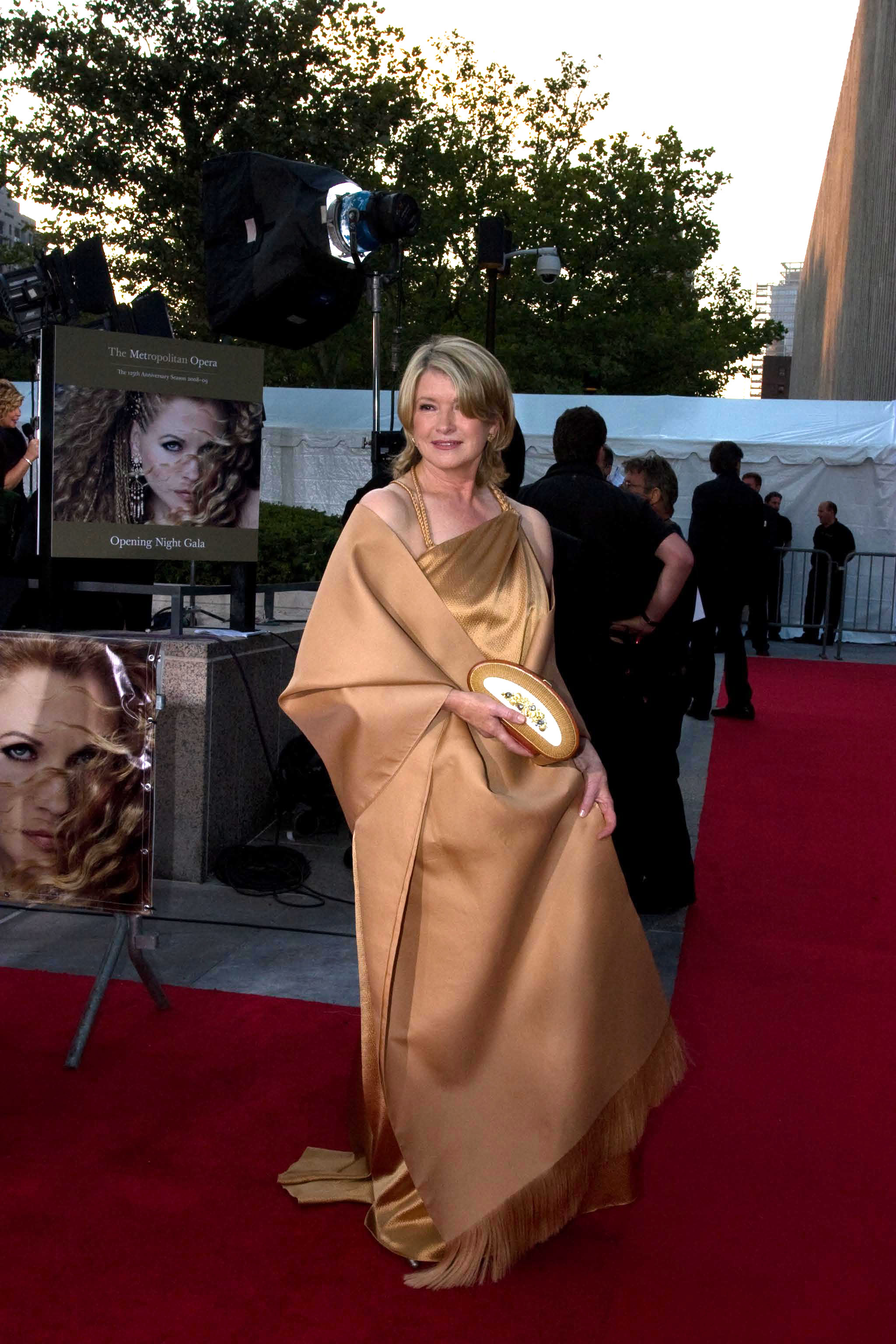
Stewart at the Metropolitan Opera opening (2008)

Following her release from prison in March 2005, Stewart launched a highly publicized comeback and was once again involved in Martha Stewart Living. Offerings of her company's Martha Stewart Everyday line at Kmart were expanded to include a new line of ready-made home furnishings, and its mass market interior paint line became available at the larger Sears stores. However, the most heavily promoted aspect of her comeback was in television. Stewart returned to daytime television with The Martha Stewart Show and appeared in an adapted version of The Apprentice (called The Apprentice: Martha Stewart). Both shows premiered in September 2005, and both were produced by Mark Burnett. Her prime time Apprentice spin-off received poor ratings. The Apprentice: Martha Stewart was not renewed for a second season.

In October 2005, Stewart released a new book, titled The Martha Rules, on starting and managing a new business, and a month later, her company released Martha Stewart Baking Handbook. In October 2006, Martha Stewart's Homekeeping Handbook, a reference book about looking after a house, was published by Clarkson Potter. She also is a regular contributor of cooking, crafts, and gardening segments on NBC's Today show. Stewart's daily talk show was nominated in six categories for the 33rd Daytime Emmy Awards in 2006, including Best Host and Best Show.

MSLO launched a line of houses that carry her name built by KB Home, initially in Cary, North Carolina. The first homes, which were inspired by Stewart's homes in New York and Mount Desert Island in Maine, were completed in early 2006. In September 2007, she launched an upscale line of housewares for Macy's, which was the largest brand launch in Macy's history. Appearing in commercials for the line, Stewart stated she had designed more than 2,000 items exclusively for Macy's. The line includes bedding, bath, cookware, and dinnerware. In addition to television and merchandising, MSLO launched a 24-hour satellite radio channel with Sirius in November 2005, with Stewart hosting a weekly call-in show.

Stewart also made a special appearance on the comedy-drama series Ugly Betty, in the November 16, 2006, episode "Four Thanksgivings and a Funeral", in which she gave her friend Wilhelmina Slater (played by Vanessa Williams) tips on how to prepare a turkey. Justin Suarez (played by Mark Indelicato) is a fan of Stewart. In July 2006, Martha Stewart Living Omnimedia announced a multi-year agreement with FLOR, Inc., the eco-friendly manufacturer of high-style modular floor coverings, to manufacture and market a new line of Martha Stewart-branded carpet tiles. The Martha Stewart Floor Designs by FLOR line debuted in 2007 with the distinctive design and color palette associated with the Martha Stewart brand. The agreement with FLOR was part of the Martha Stewart organization's growing home furnishings program, which includes a wide range of products such as furniture with Bernhardt, wall color with Lowe's, and floor coverings with FLOR.

On September 14, 2007, Martha Stewart Living Omnimedia announced that it had signed a partnership with E & J Gallo Winery to produce a wine brand with label Martha Stewart Vintage (for sale in six cities, in January 2008, at $15). The 15,000 cases to be sold included 2006 Sonoma County Chardonnay, 2005 Sonoma County Cabernet Sauvignon, and 2006 Sonoma County Merlot (for Atlanta, Boston, Charlotte, North Carolina, Denver, Phoenix, and Portland, Oregon). Martha Stewart also signed a contract with Costco to offer frozen and fresh food under the Kirkland Signature label.

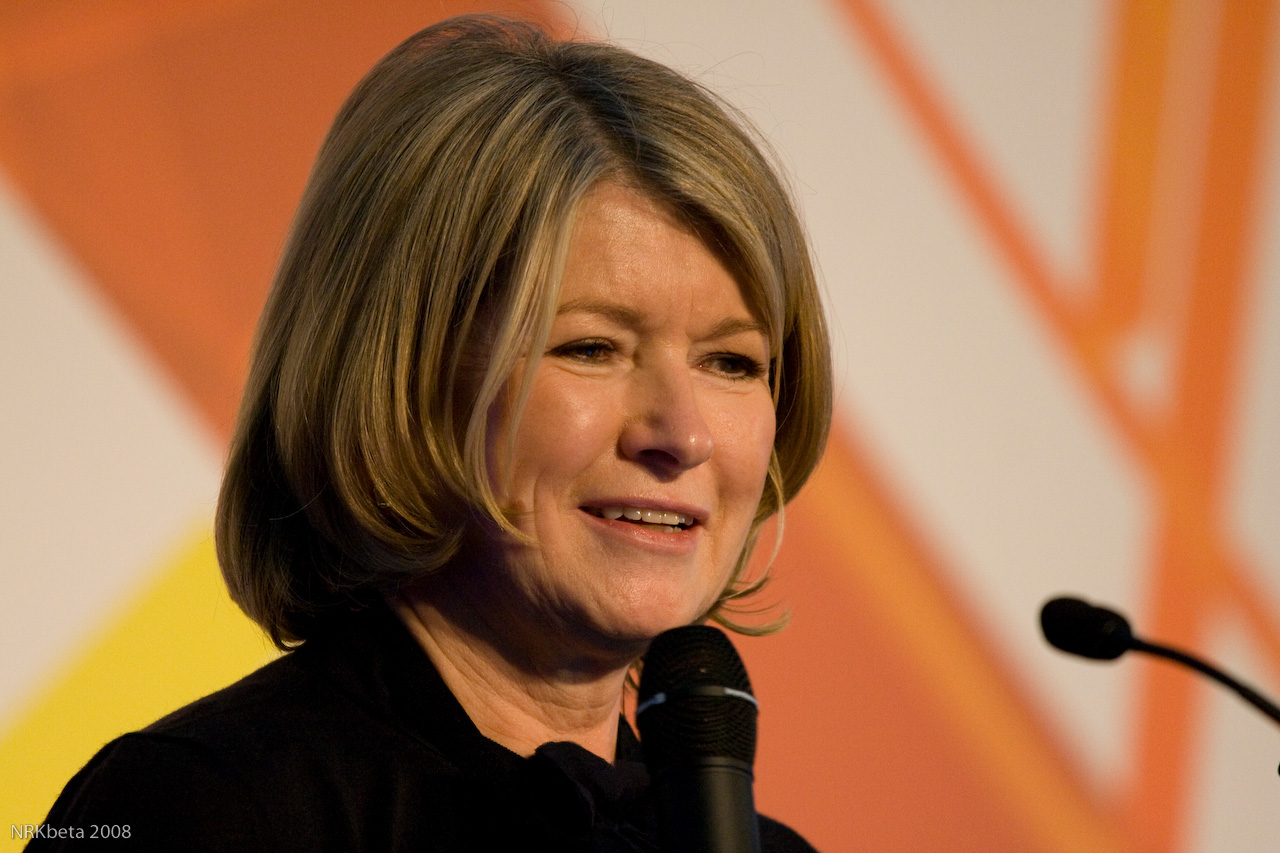
Stewart in 2008

In July 2008, craft items under the names "Martha Stewart Celebrate" and "Martha Stewart Create", two divisions of Martha Stewart Living Omnimedia, premiered in Walmart stores. The deal came about, in part, due to the closing of more than 600 Kmart stores in the U.S. In a move from broadcast television to cable, on January 26, 2010, Hallmark Channel and Martha Stewart Living Omnimedia announced a multi-year strategic partnership. Her hour-long daytime television series Martha, formerly The Martha Stewart Show, moved to the Hallmark Channel on September 13, 2010. It aired on Hallmark for two seasons, before cancellation in early 2012, with the final episode airing on May 11, 2012.

New York Magazine reported in 2011 that Martha Stewart Living magazine had only made a profit in one of the previous eight years. That same year, Stewart debuted a new 30-minute show, Martha Bakes, on the Hallmark Channel. Stewart made another foray into acting with a debut on the NBC legal drama Law & Order: Special Victims Unit. She played a private school headmistress in the episode entitled "Learning Curve" (airdate April 2012). A new television series, Martha Stewart's Cooking School, debuted on PBS in October 2012. Each weekly, 30-minute episode covers cooking techniques and basics. It is based on her eponymous book. In 2014, Stewart reportedly partnered with eBay to create the American Made Martha Stewart online store. This marketplace allows a platform to more than 400 American vendors and offers them a chance to grow their brand and popularize their products.

In 2015, Stewart made an appearance on the Comedy Central Roast of Justin Bieber, at the singer's personal request. Over the course of the seven-hour taping, Stewart sat next to Snoop Dogg, and the two unexpectedly bonded. She later joked that she got high from the constant cloud of his blunt smoke. That unlikely connection sparked a friendship that not only brought Stewart new relevance with younger audiences, but also helped revive her public image after a period of career stagnation following her incarceration. In the fall of 2016, VH1 premiered a new show featuring Stewart and her friend Snoop Dogg called Martha & Snoop's Potluck Dinner Party, featuring games, recipes, and musical guests. Snoop Dogg and Stewart also later starred together in a Super Bowl commercial for T-Mobile during Super Bowl LI in February 2017. Marley Spoon is a project of packaged and home-delivered ingredients and recipes for preparation at home. Stewart was originally a blind-tester and then joined CEO Fabian Siegel on a joint venture.

In May 2018, Stewart was floated as a candidate for a presidential pardon, but ultimately was not selected, and later claimed she would have turned it down. In June 2018, Stewart started appearing as a recurring judge for Chopped, a cooking competition on the Food Network. In October 2018, she appeared on The Ellen DeGeneres Show alongside Julia Roberts. In February 2019, Canopy Growth (CGC), a Canadian marijuana company, announced that Stewart would join their company as an adviser. A gardening show called Martha Knows Best premiered on HGTV on July 31, 2020. In it, Stewart provides gardening help to individual callers and to some of her celebrity friends. She also demonstrates some of the projects and improvements at her large (150 acre) estate. A second season aired from October 28 to December 4, 2020. A continuation entitled Martha Gets Down and Dirty premiered on Discovery+ on July 1, 2021.

In September 2020, Martha Stewart launched a line of CBD gummy supplements in association with Canopy Growth. In September 2022, Oregon-based CBD producer Wyld filed a lawsuit against the company for copyright infringement relating to the packaging of the line of products. In June 2022, Martha Stewart announced that she would be launching her first original podcast, entitled The Martha Stewart Podcast, in partnership with iHeart Radio. On June 15, 2022, Stewart shared that Snoop Dogg would be the guest on the first episode of the podcast, which debuted on June 22, 2022. Stewart introduced three new shows on The Roku Channel in 2022: Martha Gardens, Martha Cooks, and Martha Holidays.

In May 2023, Stewart appeared on the cover of Sports Illustrated Swimsuit Issue as the cover model. At 81 years old, Stewart is the oldest model to feature on the cover. In October 2024, Stewart released her 100th book, Martha: The Cookbook. It was released alongside her Netflix documentary, Martha. In 2025, Stewart co-hosted the reality cooking competition Yes, Chef! on NBC with José Andrés. The show involves twelve experienced chefs, nominated because of their cooking skills and "a problem getting along in the kitchen with others", overcoming their own personal struggles.

== Personal life ==
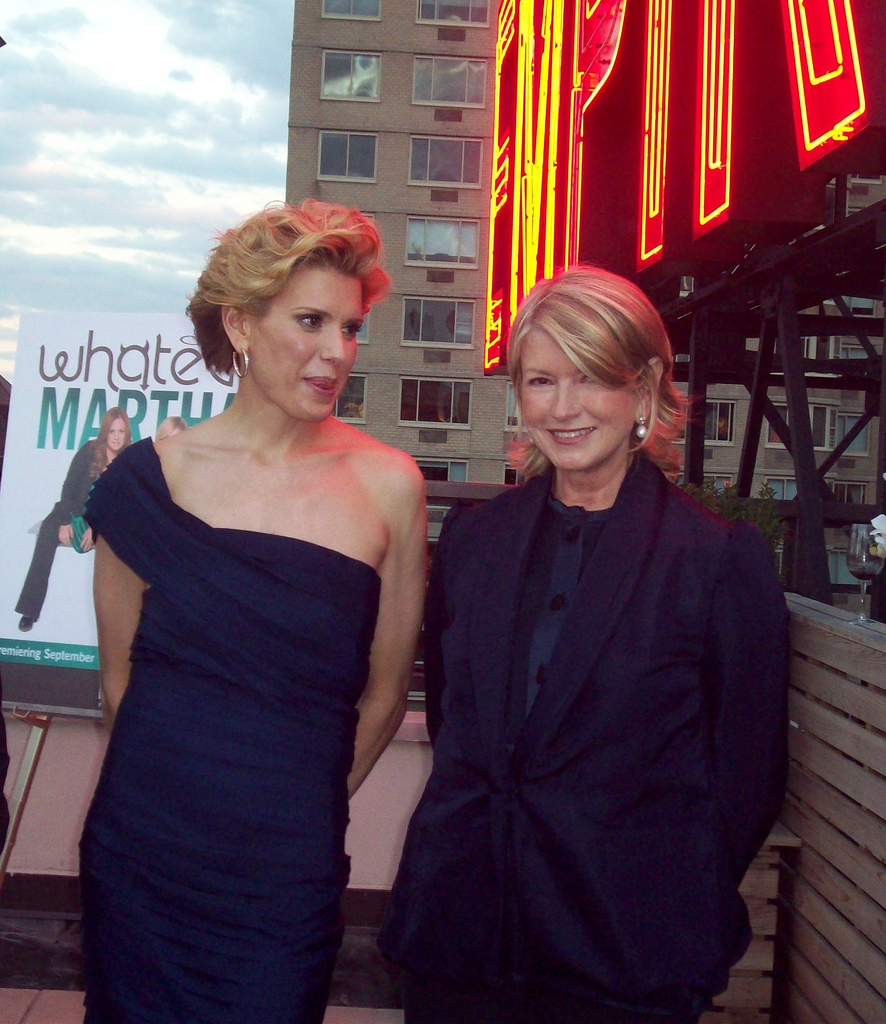
Alexis Stewart (left) and Martha Stewart (right), in September 2008

In 1961, she married Andrew Stewart, then a student at Yale Law School. Their only child, daughter Alexis Stewart, was born in 1965. The couple separated in 1987 and divorced in 1990. Through Alexis, she has two grandchildren. Stewart later revealed that she kissed a stranger during their honeymoon and that she had an affair early in her marriage. Subsequently, Martha Stewart dated Anthony Hopkins but ended the relationship after she saw The Silence of the Lambs. She stated she was unable to avoid associating Hopkins with the character of Hannibal Lecter.

Stewart dated billionaire Charles Simonyi, who was an early employee of Microsoft and head of their software group, on and off for 15 years. She featured footage of him as a space tourist aboard Soyuz on her television show in 2007. They broke up around February 2008.

Stewart is an animal lover. Her pets include champion show Chow Chow dogs, French Bulldogs, Himalayan cats, a Fell Pony named Ben Chunch, and Friesian horses. After her daughter informed her about fur farming, Stewart ceased to wear real furs.

Martha Kostyra, Stewart's mother, died at the age of 93 on November 16, 2007. Kostyra, also called "Big Martha" by her family, had appeared on Martha Stewart Living numerous times.

Stewart resides in Katonah, a hamlet of the town of Bedford, New York. She also maintains a 35,000-square-foot (3,300 m^{2}) residence on Mount Desert Island in Seal Harbor, Maine, known as Skylands, the former summer estate of automobile designer and tycoon Edsel Ford, with gardens designed by landscape architect Jens Jensen in 1922. Skylands includes a guesthouse, play house, carriage house, church, and other features.

In 2020, during Jimmy Kimmel's appearance on the TV show Finding Your Roots, a genealogy report determined that he and Stewart are cousins.

== Controversy ==
In October 2026, Stewart drew criticism after posting a since-deleted Instagram photograph of herself dressed as a homeless person for Halloween, holding a sign reading “I AM HUNGRY HELP ME!!”. She initially said the costume was intended to raise awareness of homelessness. In a later statement, she apologized, calling the costume “insensitive and not funny.”

== Filmography ==
=== Film ===
Year	Title	Role	Notes	Ref.
2002	Men in Black II	Herself	Cameo appearance	
2015	Pixels	Herself	Cameo appearance	
2016	Bad Moms	Herself	Cameo appearance	
2024	Martha	Herself	Protagonist	

=== Television ===
Year	Title	Role	Notes	Ref.
1993–2004	Martha Stewart Living	Host		
2005	The Apprentice: Martha Stewart	Host		
2005–2012	Martha	Host		
2006	Ugly Betty	Herself	Episode: "Four Thanksgivings and a Funeral"	
2009	The Simpsons	Herself (voice)	Episode: "The Good, the Sad and the Drugly"	
2012	Martha Stewart's Cooking School	Host		
2012	Law & Order: Special Victims Unit	Eleanor Hooper	Episode: "Learning Curve"	
2012	2 Broke Girls	Herself	Episode: "And the Spring Break"	
2013	Chopped	Recurring Judge		
2013	Ist Annual Hub Halloween Bash	Judge		
2015	Comedy Central Roast of Justin Bieber	Roaster		
2016–2020	Martha & Snoop's Potluck Dinner Party	Co-host		
2018–present	Chopped	Recurring Judge		
2019	SpongeBob SquarePants	Herself (voice)	Episode: "SpongeBob's Big Birthday Blowout"	
2020	Bakeaway Camp with Martha Stewart	Host / Mentor		
2020	Martha Knows Best	Host		
2021	Martha Gets Down and Dirty	Host		
2022	Martha Gardens	Host		
2022	Martha Cooks	Host		
2022	Martha Holidays	Host		
2025	Yes, Chef!	Co-host		

=== Podcasts ===
Year	Title	Role	Notes	Ref.
2022–present	The Martha Stewart Podcast	Host	iHeartRadio interview podcast	

== Recognition ==
- In 1995, Stewart received the Golden Plate Award of the American Academy of Achievement.
- In 1997, Martha Stewart was honored with an Edison Achievement Award for her commitment to innovation throughout her career.
- In 2018, Stewart was inducted into the New Jersey Hall of Fame.
- In 2020, Stewart was inducted into the Licensing International Hall of Fame.

== Portrayal in popular media ==
Stewart has been portrayed and parodied in several forms of media. Two television films have been made out of her life story: Martha, Inc.: The Story of Martha Stewart (2003) and Martha: Behind Bars (2005). She was portrayed by Cybill Shepherd in both films. A character loosely based on her, Judy King, featured in the television series Orange is the New Black.

She also made a cameo appearance in the fourth season of HBO's High Maintenance, as well as the comedy films Big Trouble (2002) and Bad Moms (2016).

She is the subject of the 2024 documentary film Martha directed by R. J. Cutler.

Good Thing, a biographical film starring Cate Blanchett as Stewart, is currently in development.
