= Sony Pictures Television Nonfiction =

American entertainment company

Industrial Media, LLC
- Logo used from 2022
- Trade name: Sony Pictures Television – Nonfiction
- Formerly: CKX, Inc. (2005–2012); CORE Media Group, Inc. (2012–2018)
- Type: Division
- Industry: Entertainment
- Founded: 7 February 2005; 21 years ago
- Founder: Robert F.X. Sillerman
- Headquarters: 10202 West Washington Boulevard, Culver City, California, United States
- Key people: Katherine Pope (president, Sony Pictures Television); Devon Hammonds (head); Roland Wieshofer (CFO)
- Products: Entertainment content; Intellectual property services
- Brands: American Idol; So You Think You Can Dance
- Number of employees: 115
- Parent: Apollo Global Management (2011–2015); Endemol Shine Group (2015–2016); Sony Pictures Television (2022–present)
- Subsidiaries: See § Assets and holdings
- Website: sonypictures.com/tv/nonfiction

Industrial Media, LLC (trading as Sony Pictures Television – Nonfiction; formerly known as CKX, Inc., and CORE Media Group, Inc.) is an American, Japanese-owned, entertainment company founded on February 7, 2005, by Robert F.X. Sillerman. It is a division of Sony Pictures Television that owns and develops unscripted entertainment content and intellectual property.

== History ==
=== Sports Entertainment Enterprises, Inc. era ===
Before its founding in 2005, and during a period from 1986 to August 2002, the company operated a franchise of golf equipment, formerly known as Sports Entertainment Enterprises. In August 2002 the company sold all of its former assets. From September 2002 to February 2005, the company's main priority was to pursue a transaction with a business enterprise.

On March 25, 2005, Sports Entertainment Enterprises, Inc. d/b/a CKX, Inc.'s shareholders voted overwhelmingly to change the company's name to CKX, Inc., to change the company's state of incorporation from Colorado to Delaware, and to increase the number of the company's authorized shares of capital stock from 105,000,000 to 275,000,000. The company's common stock would continue to trade under the stock symbol CKXE.

=== CKX, Inc. era ===
In 2005, it bought British company 19 Entertainment from Simon Fuller, who subsequently joined the company's board. With the purchase, the company acquired a majority share of the rights to the Idol series, including American Idol and So You Think You Can Dance, as well as Pop Idol in Great Britain and numerous other international versions. Later that year it bought an entertainment agency, with artists on its roster such as Robin Williams, Billy Crystal, and Woody Allen.

On February 7, 2005, the company bought 85% interest in the entities which own and/or control the commercial utilization of the name, image, and likeness of Elvis Presley, the operation of the Graceland museum and related attractions, as well as revenue derived from Elvis Presley's television specials, films, and certain of his recorded musical works, from the trust of Lisa Marie Presley.

On April 11, 2006, CKX, Inc. announced it has acquired an 80% interest in the name and likeness of Muhammad Ali. The transaction included the rights to the name, image, and likeness of Mr. Ali, certain trademarks owned by Mr. Ali and his affiliates, and the rights to all existing Ali license agreements. Mr. Ali, through affiliates, would retain a 20% interest in the business, which will be operated through a newly formed company named G.O.A.T. LLC.

On March 7, 2007, CKX, Inc. announced its subsidiary, Muhammad Ali Enterprises LLC, acquired approximately 11,000 photographs of boxer Muhammad Ali from photographer Ken Regan. The images would be immediately available for licensing and editorial purposes.

On June 1, 2007, CKX, Inc. announced it entered into a series of transactions that would result in the sale of the Company at a price of $13.75 per share in cash and the distribution to CKX stockholders of shares in FX Luxury Realty, LLC, an affiliate of Robert F.X. Sillerman. The total value for the takeover bid between Fuller and Sillerman would value the company at $1.3bn, but their attempt failed due to its timing coinciding with the start of the Global Credit Crunch.

On May 7, 2010, CKX, Inc. announced Robert F.X. Sillerman had resigned as chairman and chief executive officer of the company and from the company's board, effective immediately. Still holding 21% of the shares, he began working with One Equity Partners on a $550–$560 million takeover bid. In May, Fuller teamed up with former Barclays Capital executive Roger Jenkins, creating a $1Bn fund. They propose as their first purchase CKX, at a bid level of $600 million. On the current share price, CKX is valued at $395 million, with $101 million of debt and $55 million of cash at the end of first quarter 2010. However, in 2010-10-27, CKX, Inc. announced it was no longer discussing a potential sale of the company or of a controlling stake in the company.

On May 10, 2011, CKX, Inc. it has entered into a definitive merger agreement to be acquired by an affiliate of Apollo Global Management ("Apollo"). The company was to be sold in $5.50 per Common Share, for a total of $560 million. On June 16, 2011, CKX Entertainment Offeror, LLC (f/k/a Colonel Offeror Sub, LLC) ("Offeror") and CKX, Inc. ("CKX") announced the successful completion of the acquisition offer of approximately 50,819,769 Common Shares, with offering period set to expire at 5:00 p.m., New York City time, on June 20, 2011. On June 21, 2011, Offeror and CKX announced the successful completion of the tender offer by Offeror.

On June 21, 2011, CKX Entertainment, Inc. and CKX, Inc. announced the successful completion of parent's acquisition of CKX, with parent being an acquisition entity controlled by investment funds managed by affiliates of Apollo Global Management, LLC.

=== CORE Media Group, Inc. era ===
On May 31, 2012, CORE Media Group, Inc. announced its own launch in the same day, a newly branded version of the company formerly known as CKX.

In July 2012, CORE Media Group announced it has acquired the reality television production company Sharp Entertainment.

On November 19, 2013, it was announced that CORE Media Group had sold its stake in Elvis Presley Enterprises and Muhammad Ali Enterprises.

On May 15, 2014, Apollo and 21st Century Fox announced a joint venture to combine 21st Century Fox's Shine Group and Apollo's Endemol and CORE Media Group.

As a result of bankruptcy in 2016, CORE transferred assets to a new corporation, NEG Holdings LLC, d/b/a CORE Media Group.

As CORE Media Group, they created the game-show Caraoke Showdown, along with Alevy Productions. The series aired in 2017 on Spike and was hosted by comedian and actor Craig Robinson. CORE also created the wildlife animal rescue series Vet Gone Wild for Animal Planet, which began airing June 10, 2018. The show features veterinarian Dr. Chris Brown, well known for his Australian veterinarian series Bondi Vet.

=== Industrial Media era ===
On August 6, 2018, CORE Media Group announced the acquisition of The Intellectual Property Corporation, with immediate relaunching of the company as Industrial Media. Eli Holzman of The Intellectual Property Corporation would become IM's new CEO, while IPC's president and co-founder Aaron Saidman would become IM's president while also remaining in his current capacity as president of IPC, CORE's executive chairman Dennis Miller would become Industrial Media's chairman.

In March 2019, Industrial Media announced an overall deal with nonfiction production company Momentum Content.

In August 2019, Industrial Media announced an overall deal with Don Cheadle's production company This Radicle Act.

In September 2019, unscriped producer Todd Hurvitz signed an overall deal with Industrial Media.

On June 23, 2020, Industrial Media named Roland Wieshofer as CFO, replacing Scott Frosch.

In October 2020, R. J. Cutler launched his production company This Machine Filmworks in partnership with Industrial Media.

In April 2021, Industrial Media announced an overall deal with Trilogy Films, a production company founded by Dawn Porter.

In November 2021, Industrial Media announced an overall deal with House of NonFiction, a production company founded by Alex Stapleton.

=== Sony era ===
In March 2022, Sony Pictures Television announced that it had agreed to acquire Industrial Media for $350 million. Once the acquisition was finalized in November 2022, the company's trade name became Sony Pictures Television Nonfiction and Eli Holzman became president of Nonfiction Entertainment at SPT with Aaron Saidman becoming co-president of Nonfiction.

In February 2023, it was announced that Gena McCarthy's production company UNConventional Entertainment has signed an overall deal with Sony Pictures Television Nonfiction.

In October 2023, Nile Cappello's production company Yes, Like the River signed an overall deal with The Intellectual Property Corporation.

In January 2024, Sony Pictures Television Nonfiction signed overall deals with production companies Brass Monkeys Media and Royal Entertainment Group.

In May 2024, Jeff Collins launched his production company Resilient Content, signing an overall deal with Sony Pictures Television Nonfiction.

In December 2025, Simon Shalgosky and Daniel Brookes launched Rebel Minds Media, signing an overall deal with Sony Pictures Television Nonfiction beginning in 2026, marking the studio's first international expansion in the United Kingdom.

In March 2026, Eli Holzman and Aaron Saidman left Sony Pictures Television Nonfiction to pursue their next entrepreneurial venture, taking their company The Intellectual Property Corporation with them, with oversight for the division moved under Sony Pictures Television president Katherine Pope alongside her leadership of the scripted and kids businesses.

In May 2026, Sony Pictures Television Nonfiction acquired 32 Flavors, with founder Alex Baskin remaining as CEO.

In June 2026, Devon Hammonds was promoted to head of nonfiction at Sony Pictures Television after previously serving as executive VP, business development and strategy, succeeding Eli Holzman and Aaron Saidman after their departure from the company.

== Assets and holdings ==
Sony Pictures Television – Nonfiction's assets and holdings at present include:

- 19 Entertainment – Founded in 1985 by Simon Fuller. Acquired in 2005 for $200 million. 19 owns, among other things, a share of the rights to the Idol series, including Pop Idol in the United Kingdom, American Idol in the United States, and numerous other international versions, and So You Think You Can Dance in the United States.
  - 19 Recordings – Founded in 1999 by Simon Fuller.
- 32 Flavors – Founded in 2023 by Alex Baskin. Acquired in 2026.
- B17 Entertainment – Founded in 2013 by Rhett Bachner and Brien Meagher.
- This Machine Filmworks – Founded in 2020 by R. J. Cutler.
- Sharp Entertainment – Founded in 2003 by Matt Sharp. Acquired in 2012.
- Maxine Productions – Founded in 2022 by Mary Robertson.
- Rebel Minds Media – Founded in 2025 by Simon Shalgosky and Daniel Brookes.

== Marketing ==
=== CKX ===
The "C" and "K" in "CKX" stood for "Content is King", representing the focus of the company's business strategy to acquire established content, and then to improve, enhance and develop the marketing of such content. The "X" takes an initial of founder Robert F.X. Sillerman, and is a trademark of many Sillerman companies, such as "SFX Entertainment" and "FXM Asset Management"
