= Fight for Glory: The 2024 World Series =

Fight for Glory: The 2024 World Series is a 2025 documentary series which explores the 2024 World Series between the Los Angeles Dodgers and the New York Yankees. It was directed by R.J. Cutler.
