= A Perfect Candidate =

1996 American documentary film

- Theatrical release poster
- Directed by: R. J. Cutler; David Van Taylor
- Produced by: R. J. Cutler; David Van Taylor; Dan Partland; Ted Skillman
- Cinematography: Nicholas Doob
- Edited by: Mona Davis
- Production company: Arpie Films
- Distributed by: Seventh Art Releasing
- Release dates: April 19, 1996 (USA Film Festival, Dallas); June 19, 1996
- Running time: 105 minutes
- Country: United States
- Language: English
- Box office: $134,485

A Perfect Candidate is a 1996 documentary about the 1994 United States Senate election in Virginia between Democrat Chuck Robb and Republican Oliver North. The film aired on television as part of the PBS series P.O.V. in 1997, earning the network an Emmy Award nomination.

== Release ==
External videos
- Conversation with Cutler, Van Taylor, and Mark Goodin about A Perfect Candidate, June 25, 1996, Charlie Rose
- Washington Journal interview with Van Taylor and Don Baker about A Perfect Candidate, July 11, 1996, C-SPAN

=== Box office ===
Screened at only a few locations, the film grossed $134,485 at the box office.

=== Critical reception ===
The film received mostly positive reviews from critics. Rotten Tomatoes gives it a "fresh" rating of 88% , based on 17 reviews and an average score of 7/10. Roger Ebert gave the film three out of four stars. On At the Movies, Ebert and Gene Siskel each gave a thumbs up to the film. Hal Hinson of The Washington Post called it "the best American documentary since Hoop Dreams and one of a small handful of essential films about politics in this country."

=== Accolades ===
At the 19th News & Documentary Emmy Awards, P.O.V. (PBS), R. J. Cutler, and David Van Taylor were nominated for Outstanding Investigative Journalism (Programs).

=== Home media ===
The film was first released on VHS by First Run Features on February 15, 2000. It was reissued on DVD by First Run on April 20, 2004, with special features, including an audio commentary by Cutler and Van Taylor.

== See also ==
- Politics of Virginia
