= Sony Pictures Television =

American television production and distribution studio

Sony Pictures Television Inc.
- Logo used since 2002
- Type: Division
- Industry: Television
- Predecessor: Columbia TriStar Television
- Founded: September 16, 2002; 24 years ago
- Headquarters: 10202 West Washington Boulevard, Culver City, California, United States
- Area served: Worldwide
- Key people: Keith Le Goy (chairman); Katherine Pope (president, Studios); Wayne Garvie (president, International Production)
- Services: Television production; Television syndication
- Parent: Sony Pictures Entertainment
- Divisions: Formats; Game Shows; International Production; Kids; Music Development; Networks; Nonfiction; Studios
- Subsidiaries: See § Units
- Website: sonypictures.com/tv

Sony Pictures Television Inc. (abbreviated as SPT) is an American television production and distribution studio and the television arm of Sony Pictures Entertainment, the film studio subsidiary of Sony Group Corporation. Established on September 16, 2002 and based at the Sony Pictures Studios complex in Culver City, California, it is a renaming of the Columbia TriStar Television studio and the fourth and current iteration of what had originated as Columbia Pictures' television studio, Screen Gems.

== History ==
Sony Pictures Television's history goes back to 1947, when Ralph Cohn, whose father Jack and uncle Harry co-founded Columbia Pictures, founded Pioneer Telefilms. It was bought by Columbia and renamed Screen Gems in November 1948, reincorporated as Columbia Pictures Television on May 6, 1974, and merged with sister studio TriStar Television (formed in 1986 and relaunched in 1991) to form Columbia TriStar Television on February 21, 1994. On September 16, 2002, Sony Pictures Entertainment renamed the American studio as Sony Pictures Television and its international division as Sony Pictures Television International (SPTI).

On June 7, 2004, Sony Pictures Television, under their international television production unit Sony Pictures Television International, announced that they had entered the French television market by acquiring French television production company Starling from Canal+ S.A. owned Studio Expand and it was made part of Sony Pictures Television International until April 1, 2009, when all SPT's companies and joint ventures were combined under one roof.

In November 2004, Sony Pictures Television, under their international television arm Sony Pictures Television International, had announced that they had entered a Chinese film and television production joint venture with China Film Group's division Hua Long Film Digital Production to launch a new company which was named Huaso, marking Sony Pictures Television first entry into the Chinese market and to increase Sony Pictures Television's Asian television production with Dandan Zhang leading the joint venture company.

In summer 2007, SPT introduced The Minisode Network, a digital channel for MySpace airing shows from the 1960s to early 2000s from four to five minutes. In winter 2007, The Minisode Network was also added to a few more sites including AOL TV, YouTube, and its then-sister site Crackle.

In March 2008, Sony Pictures Television's international television division, Sony Pictures Television International, had acquired a minority stake in the then-recently launched London-based British television production company founded by former Lion Television executive producers Mat Steiner and Adam Wood named Gogglebox Entertainment, expanding Sony Pictures Television's British television operations with Sony Pictures Television International obtaining international distribution rights to Gogglebox's formats.

In 2008, SPT bought 2waytraffic, international holders of the Who Wants to Be a Millionaire? franchise.

On January 14, 2009, Sony Pictures Television acquired Embassy Row, a television and digital production company by British television producer Michael Davies following their success of their three-year deal with Embassy Row back in 2006 thrust expanding their American non-scripted television production operations. Two weeks later, SPTI acquired a 50% stake in Colombian independent TV production company Teleset, making it the last company acquired by the studio before all SPT's companies and joint ventures were combined under one roof.

Two months later, on April 1, Sony Pictures consolidated its American and international television divisions under one roof under SPT brand. Sony Pictures Television International now operates in-name-only.

On June 23, 2011, SPT formed Victory Television, a London-based television production company jointly owned by Victoria Ashbourne, SPT's senior vice president of creative development for international production (not to be confused with Jim Victory Television, a defunct syndication company previously owned by MTM Enterprises). On September 25, 2011, Andrea Wong was appointed to lead the international television production division of Sony Pictures Television to oversee all international businesses for the studio.

On January 19, 2012, Sony Pictures Television acquired Dolphin Broadcast Services Ltd. and merged it into its existing British networks business. They also took a majority stake in Dolphin's advertising sales business. On March 1, 2012, Sony Pictures Television acquired a majority stake in UK independent production company Silver River Productions. On May 31, SPT launched Sony Movie Channel and AXN in Canada in partnership with Hollywood Suite. Two of Hollywood Suite's networks: Hollywood Festival re-launched as Sony Movie Channel and Hollywood Storm as AXN Movies on September 4, 2012.

On August 23 2012, Sony Pictures Television had announced they've acquired a majority stake of British independent television production company Left Bank Pictures, a UK production company founded by Andy Harries, Francis Hopkinson, and Marigo Kehoe, the acquisition expanded Sony Pictures Television's British television production operations and marked its entry into the British scripted television production industry with as the former started distributed Left Bank Pictures' future television content worldwide.

On August 22, 2013, Sony Pictures Television acquired a majority stake in Simon Andrae's new production company Scarlet Media. However, two months later, Andrae dropped his plans for Scarlet and was appointed to become executive vice-president of alternative entertainment for Fox. On December 16, 2013, Tuvalu Media joined forces with financing firm Karmign and acquired SPT's 60% stakes to regain independence. SPT acquired 60% in Tuvalu in 2008.

On June 26, 2014, SPT announced the decision to acquire CSC Media Group including 16 of its cable channels. the deal closed on August 15, 2014. On November 6, 2014, Daisy Goodwin resigned from Silver River Productions amid Sony's restructuring. The studio had restructured its operations to SPT's streamline operations. She was less active in her production company and had been focusing on her books.

On December 1, 2014, Sony Pictures Television acquired Sydney-based Australian independent drama production company Playmaker Media, expanding the former's international television production operations and gave the American studio their own Australian production unit with Playmaker Media co-founders and managing directors David Taylor and David Maher continuing to lead the acquired scripted programming production company as Sony Pictures Television started distributing Playmaker Media's future programmes internationally.

On July 26, 2014, Liberty Global announced that it had put Film1 up for sale. Liberty Global agreed to sell Film1 to Sony Pictures Television on March 27, 2015. The sale was completed on July 21, 2015.

On May 28, 2015, TriStar Television was re-launched as a boutique production label for Sony Pictures Television. The first new series was Good Girls Revolt and was piloted for Amazon Prime Video.

As of September 2015, it was the world's largest television production and distribution company measured by library and revenue (along with Warner Bros. Television).

On March 1, 2016, Sony announced to shut down Victory Television after Managing Director Victoria Ashbourne announced her resignation after five years to pursue other opportunities. SPT retained international distribution rights for all of Victory's productions.

In July 2016, Sony Pictures Television had taken a minority stake in Swedish production company Palladium Fiction, expanding Sony Pictures Television's international television operation and marked the first time Sony Pictures Television had entered the Swedish television production industry with Palladium Fiction founders Henrik Bjorn, Filip Hammarstrom and Johan Rudolphie continued to lead the acquired company under Sony.

On July 25, 2017, SPE's new chairman and CEO, Tony Vinciquerra appointed Jeff Frost, Chris Parnell, and Jason Clodfelter as co-presidents of SPT. Frost joined SPT in 2008 from ABC Studios, Parnell in 2003 and Clodfelter in 2006.

The same day, Sony Pictures Television Studios was founded, which later began rolling out for current and future SPT titles starting on January 7, 2020. It would soon be discontinued in 2022, then later phased out on April 12, 2024.

On July 31, 2017, Sony Pictures Television announced that it would acquire a 95% controlling stake in anime importer Funimation for $143 million pending approval from the U.S. Department of Justice. Sony touted that the deal would allow Funimation to have synergies with its Animax and Kids Station divisions and "direct access to the creative pipeline". The Department of Justice approved the acquisition on August 22, 2017. The deal was closed on October 27, 2017. On September 24, 2019, Sony Pictures Television later announced that it would be consolidating Funimation with Aniplex's Madman Anime Group and Wakanim, under a joint-venture between the two Sony businesses.

In September 2018, Sony Pictures Television announced that they had brought a minority stake in British independent scripted production company Eleventh Hour Films following their partnership with the British company back in November 2017. The new deal would give Sony Pictures Television's access to Eleventh Hour Films productions and would distribute them internationally around the world.

On December 10, 2019, Sony Pictures Television announced that it would acquire the British studio Silvergate Media—producers of Octonauts and the Netflix series Hilda, for US$175 million.

In April 2020, Sony Pictures Television announced it had acquired a significant stake in London-based British television production company Eleven Film. The deal to acquire a stake of Eleven Film included Channel 4's 20% stake in the company and expansion of Sony Pictures Television's drama production output and its British television operations. Two months later in June, Sony Pictures Television announced that it had acquired a majority stake in London-based British television production company Eleven Film, expanding Sony Pictures Television's drama television production operations and its British television production output with Channel 4 dropping its 20% stake in Eleven Film.

Two months later in July of that same year, Sony Pictures Television announced that they had sold their French unscripted television production division Sony Pictures Television France along with their production company Starling to Paris-based French reality production company Satisfaction Group and renamed the company as Satisfy with Sony Pictures Television taking a 20% stake in Satisfaction Group in return and had signed an exclusive joint venture deal with them as their international distribution partner outside of France.

Sony had shifted to content licensing as a focus instead of owning the channels, which were previously high-margin earners. Subsequently, the Southeast Asia channels group were identified as potential for sale. Sony Pictures Television agreed in January 2020 to sell its Southeast Asian and Korean television channels, the AXN network, Animax and Sony One, to KC Global Media, which was owned by former SPT executives Andy Kaplan and George Chien. The sale was completed, with the addition of the Gem channel, in May 2020.

On May 14, 2021, SPT sold its UK television channels (including some assets of CSC Media Group) to Narrative Capital.

On October 1, 2021, SPT sold its Central and Eastern Europe television channels and two OTT services to Antenna Group.

On December 1, 2021, SPT bought a majority stake in the Welsh production company, Bad Wolf.

In July 2022, Sony Pictures Television established a deal with French international television production and distribution company Banijay to acquire the former's German television division Sony Pictures Film und Fernseh Produktions GmbH (Sony Pictures Television Germany) to expand Banijay's German operations and would go under a different name with Sony Pictures Television Germany bosses Astrid Quentell and Mirek Nitsch would continue to lead the company. Three months later in October of that same year, Banijay completed its purchase of Sony Pictures Television Germany, which was renamed Noisy Pictures.

In October 2023, it was announced longtime SPT head of production Ed Lammi would retire that December after 36 years. Lammi had been with the company since 1987, during his tenure with Columbia/Embassy Television.

In October 2024, Sony Pictures Television launched a new production company based in Belfast named Hot Sauce Pictures with Declan Lawn and Adam Patterson, marking Sony Pictures Television's second Irish production company and expanded their UK television operations with Hot Sauce Pictures joining Sony Picture Television's international production activities.

== Units ==
Sony Pictures Television comprises eight main divisions: Formats, Game Shows, International Production, Kids, Music Development, Nonfiction, Networks and Studios.

In addition, SPT owns several local television studios in 12 countries around the world through its International Production division.

Production and distribution units from Sony Pictures Television include:

List of production offices
Region/country	Unit(s)
United States	Affirm Television; CPT Holdings; Embassy Row; Sony Pictures Television Formats; Sony Pictures Television Game Shows; Califon Productions; Jeopardy Productions; Sony Pictures Television Kids (also in the United Kingdom); Sony Pictures Television Music Development; Sony Pictures Television Networks; Sony Pictures Television Networks Originals; Sony Pictures Television Nonfiction; 19 Entertainment; 19 Recordings; 32 Flavors; B17 Entertainment; Maxine Productions; Rebel Minds Media; Sharp Entertainment; This Machine Filmworks; Sony Pictures Television Studios
Australia	Curio Pictures
France	Satisfaction Group (20%); Satisfaction – The Television Agency; Satisfy; Starling; AH! Production; Enibas Productions; Elimac Productions; La Grosse Equipe; Alef One; Satisfaction Iberia
United Kingdom	Bad Wolf; Wolf Studios Wales; Bad Wolf America (30%); Blueprint Television (joint venture with Blueprint Pictures); Eleven Film; Eleventh Hour Films; Fable Pictures (minority stake); Hot Sauce Pictures (joint venture with Declan Law and Adam Patterson); Left Bank Pictures; Sony Pictures Television Kids (also in the United States); Stellify Media (joint venture with Kieran Doherty and Matthew Worthy)
Latin America	Floresta Productions (Brazil); Teleset (Colombia); Teleset Mexico
International	AXN (Brazil, Latin America, Portugal, Spain); Sony Channel (Latin America); Sony Pictures Television International Production (scripted division)
Former/Defunct	2waytraffic (Netherlands); Adelaide Productions (United States); Crackle (United States streaming service; sold to Chicken Soup for the Soul Entertainment); CSC Media Group (United Kingdom); Culver Entertainment (United States); Electric Ray (United Kingdom); Gemstone Studios (United States); Gogglebox Entertainment (United Kingdom); Huaso (China; joint venture with Hua Long Film Digital Production); Human Media (United Kingdom); Lean-M (Russia; sold to JVM Holdings); Palladium Fiction (Sweden); Scarlet Media (United Kingdom); Shine Group (United Kingdom; 21% stake sold back to the company); Silver River Productions (United Kingdom); Sony Pictures Family Entertainment Group (United States); Sony Pictures Television France (France; sold to Satisfaction Group); Sony Pictures Television Germany (Germany; sold to Banijay); Starling (France; sold to Satisfaction Group); Stolen Picture (United Kingdom); The Minisode Network (United States; internet television network); The Whisper Group (United Kingdom; 30% stake sold back to the company); Toro Media (Italy); TriStar Television (United States); Tuvalu Media (Netherlands; 60% stake sold back to the company); TV1 (Australian TV network; joint venture with NBCUniversal and CBS Studios International); Victory Television (United Kingdom)

== Sony Pictures Television Networks ==
These are the channels that are either fully or jointly owned and operated by Sony Pictures Television Networks. For former channels owned under CSC Media Group, see CSC Media Group.

=== United States ===
- CPE US Networks, Inc.
  - Great Entertainment Television: A digital multicast network airing classic series by Sony Pictures Entertainment, NBCUniversal, Warner Bros. Television, and CBS Media Ventures that was launched on February 3, 2014.
  - Sony Movies: A cable channel launched on October 1, 2010.
  - Sony Cine: A Spanish-language cable channel launched in August 2012.
- Game Show Network, LLC
  - Game Show Network: A cable channel launched on December 1, 1994.
  - Game Show Central: A free ad-supported streaming television network that airs programming from Game Show Network launched on March 28, 2020.
  - Crunchyroll Channel: A free ad-supported streaming television network that airs anime programming from sister company Crunchyroll, LLC launched on October 11, 2023, on The Roku Channel, LG Channels, and Vizio WatchFree+, on October 17, 2023, on Amazon Freevee and on February 5, 2024, on Pluto TV. (Note: Crunchyroll, LLC and Game Show Network, LLC parent company Sony formed Crunchyroll Channel through a partnership between the two companies, despite both of them being owned by different divisions of Sony. Crunchyroll, LLC is owned by Sony Pictures Entertainment and Sony Music Entertainment Japan's Aniplex, while Game Show Network, LLC is owned by the Sony Pictures Television Networks division of Sony Pictures Television.)

=== International ===
- Sony Channel
- Sony Pictures Network India: Launched as SET India Private Limited on September 30, 1995.
- AXN: Launched on June 22, 1997.

== Filmography ==
Notable programs produced or distributed by SPT include Jeopardy!, Days of Our Lives, The Young and the Restless, Wheel of Fortune, Who Wants to Be a Millionaire?, Jackie Chan Adventures, Shark Tank, Seinfeld, The King of Queens, Breaking Bad, Better Call Saul, The Boys, Community, Cobra Kai, The Goldbergs, The Spectacular Spider-Man, Hilda, 90 Day Fiancé, Pluribus, Spider-Noir, and many others.
