= Elizabeth Hawes (author) =

American author and journalist

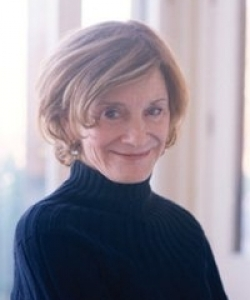
- Elizabeth Hawes
- Occupations: author and journalist
- Website: elizabethhawes.com

Elizabeth (“Betsy”) Hawes is an American author, journalist and ghostwriter. She has several books to her credit.

== Works ==
Hawes is former staff member at The New Yorker, and has contributed "Talk of the Town" and "Reporter" pieces to that magazine, as well as essays and reviews to The New York Times Magazine and Book Review, The Nation and numerous other publications. She was also the ghostwriter for Martha Stewart’s best-selling books Entertaining and Weddings.

Hawes is the author of New York, New York: How the Apartment House Transformed the Life of the City, 1869-1930 (Knopf, 1992), a narrative account of the golden age of the New York luxury apartment house that tells how New York was transformed architecturally, socially, and psychologically from a provincial city into a great metropolis.

Her most recent book, Camus: A Romance, (Grove Press, 2009) is a biography-memoir of the Nobel Prize–winning French-Algerian writer Albert Camus, in which she chronicles his life along with her own experience trying to follow in his footsteps.

== Personal life ==
Hawes, who is also known as Betsy Weinstock, is married with three children and resides in New York City and Martha's Vineyard.
