= The Minisode Network =

- Country: United States

Programming
- Language(s): English

Ownership
- Owner: Sony Pictures Television

History
- Launched: June 2007

Links
- Website: sonypictures.com/tv/minisode

The Minisode Network (later known as Crackle Minisodes) was a Sony Pictures Television internet television network launched in June 2007. The term minisode is a portmanteau of "mini" and "episode". Unlike webisodes, which are initially broadcast on the Internet, minisodes are condensed versions of previously broadcast, full length, television series.

== History ==
The New York Times reported that the idea came out of a conversation between the president of Sony Pictures Television, Steve Mosko, and the head of Sony Pictures Television Distribution John Weiser, after they saw the "Seven-Minute Sopranos", a condensation of the 77-hour HBO series posted on YouTube, and after watching a collection of mini clips found at the end of a DVD for the international television series titled Kung Faux that had recently released its first season as a Box Set under the promotional companion name "Bento Box TV". The DVD Box Set had been passed along by Ross Pollack, then V.P. of Sony Pictures Television in Asia, and now CEO of Celestial Pictures in Hong Kong. Kung Faux was subsequently picked up for distribution in Sub-Saharan Africa (SSA) by Sony Pictures Television (SPE) soon after this viewing, and the idea for "The Minisode Network" was born.

Using the Sony Pictures Television library, the network consists of heavily re-edited television series designed to run from four to six minutes, yet retain the story arc from the original broadcast episode. The network is ad supported, and past sponsors have included Honda and Pepsi.

On 1 April 2009, Sony Pictures Television consolidated its US and international television subsidiaries and joint ventures including The Minisode Network under one roof under the SPT brand. Sony Pictures Television International now operates in-name-only.

Originally set up as part of an exclusive agreement with MySpace, the network now includes several other video hosting services. According to a Sony website, the network is available on the following services:

- YouTube
- MySpace
- Crackle (Formerly Grouper, and owned by Sony)
- Verizon Wireless
- AOL video
- Gaia Online
- Joost

== Shows ==
=== Television series ===
The following shows are available in the minisode format on Minisode Network video hosting services.

- Dilbert
- What's Happening!!
- Diff'rent Strokes
- Voltron: Defender of the Universe
- The Facts of Life
- The Karate Kid (TV series)
- Spider-Man: The New Animated Series
- Malcolm & Eddie
- Sheena (TV series)
- V.I.P.
- Ricki Lake
- NewsRadio
- The Partridge Family
- Silver Spoons
- Who's the Boss?
- Fantasy Island
- Charlie's Angels
- Married... with Children
- I Dream of Jeannie
- Bewitched
- The Jeffersons
- Starsky and Hutch
- T. J. Hooker
- Police Woman
- Jackie Chan Adventures
- My Two Dads
- The Three Stooges
- Good Times
- Roughnecks: Starship Troopers Chronicles
- Jeopardy!
- Godzilla: The Series

=== As DVD bonuses ===
Taking the lead from the example provided by the international Kung Faux television series on DVD aka "Bento Box TV", Minisodes have also begun to show up on Sony DVD releases, e.g., minisodes of Charlie's Angels and The Facts of Life on the second-season DVD set of Barney Miller.

=== Original Minisodes ===
On June 24, 2008, FX Network broadcast 10 original Rescue Me Minisode episodes over ten weeks, and the next day made them available on the various Minisode Network outlets. This is the first time original shows have appeared on the Minisode Network.

In January 2009, Michael Buckley of YouTube's What the Buck!? fame became 'The Minisode Maniac' by discussing and promoting the Minisode Network's content on the Minisode's YouTube page and Crackle.

On February 17, 2009, AMC and Sony teamed up to offer webisodes (referring to them as "Original Minisodes") of Breaking Bad that take place between seasons one and two. These episodes were made available on the Minisode's home Crackle and AMC's site.

In February 2009, the Minisode Network began hosting Minisodes of Sports Illustrated's hour long Swimsuit Specials from the years 2002-2004. Twenty-six Minisodes were originally presented and are available on Crackle.
