= Marc by Sofia =

2025 documentary film

- Theatrical release poster
- Directed by: Sofia Coppola
- Produced by: Jane Cha Cutler; Sofia Coppola; R. J. Cutler; Elise Pearlstein; Trevor Smith
- Starring: Marc Jacobs
- Cinematography: Roman Coppola; Jenna Rosher; Shane Sigler
- Edited by: Chad Sipkin
- Production companies: A24; This Machine
- Distributed by: A24
- Release dates: September 2, 2025 (Venice); March 20, 2026 (United States)
- Running time: 87 minutes
- Country: United States
- Language: English
- Box office: $283,345

Marc by Sofia is a 2025 American documentary film directed by Sofia Coppola, about the fashion designer Marc Jacobs. It marks Coppola's first nonfiction feature film, and had its world premiere out of competition of the 82nd Venice International Film Festival on September 2, 2025.

== Premise ==
In the lead-up to Marc Jacobs' 2024 "paper doll"-themed runway show, his longtime friend Sofia Coppola interviews him about his work and life story. Jacobs discusses his early life (including his father's early death, his difficult relationship with his stepfather, and his decision to live with his grandmother in Manhattan). He studies at Parsons School of Design and spends an early stint at Perry Ellis, where he releases a controversial "grunge" collection that purportedly gets him fired (he denies this). The two friends discuss the occasional difficulties of the creative process.

Jacobs likens his show to a theatrical production, and Coppola follows him as he plans large and minute details of the show, including fabrics, jewelry, makeup, and gigantic campy stage props. A cultural collagist, Jacobs mentions some of the filmmakers that influenced him, including Bob Fosse, Rainer Werner Fassbinder, and Marcel Duchamp.

== Reception ==
On the review aggregator website Rotten Tomatoes, 73% of 44 critics' reviews are positive, with an average rating of 6.6/10. The website's consensus reads: "A fly-on-the-wall tour through Marc Jacobs' day-to-day, Sofia Coppola's documentary can feel more like third-wheeling a friendship than an informative exposé, but it does offer a chic glimpse into the artistic process." Metacritic, which uses a weighted average, assigned the film a score of 59 out of 100, based on 14 critics, indicating "mixed or average" reviews.

Nell Minow of RogerEbert.com gave the film three out of four stars and wrote that it is "affectionate". Matthew Carey of Deadline writes that the film "starts off rather slowly but gets moving when it dials back to the early 1990s" and that, at times, it can seem "a bit clubby" and "a touch too cool for school" but ultimately is forgivable as audiences "marvel at what, over a period of decades, Marc Jacobs has made."
