= Martha (2024 film) =

- Release poster
- Directed by: R. J. Cutler
- Produced by: Jane Cha Cutler; Alina Cho; R. J. Cutler; Trevor Smith; Austin Wilkin
- Starring: Martha Stewart
- Cinematography: Bill Winters
- Edited by: Lindsay Utz; Doyle Esch
- Music by: Colin Stetson
- Distributed by: Netflix
- Release date: October 30, 2024
- Running time: 115 minutes
- Country: United States
- Language: English

Martha is a 2024 American documentary film which explores the life of businesswoman and homemaker Martha Stewart. It is produced and directed by R. J. Cutler. The film debuted on Netflix on October 30, 2024. It received generally positive reviews from critics.

== Reception ==
On the review aggregator website Rotten Tomatoes, 90% of 39 critics' reviews are positive, with an average rating of 6.90/10. The website's consensus reads: "Glossy like a Martha Stewart cookbook and just as pleasurable to parse, R.J. Cutler's documentary offers an intimate glimpse into one of America's most enduring icons." Metacritic, which uses a weighted average, assigned the film a score of 69 out of 100, based on 10 critics, indicating "generally favorable" reviews.

Owen Gleiberman of Variety wrote, "Martha tells a transfixing story, and part of what makes the film so compelling is the way Cutler spins Stewart's biography into a meditation on The Meaning of Martha. The film hails her as 'the first influencer,' and that feels right if you add that the world of 'influencing' is essentially a sponsor-driven grand illusion. It certainly was for Stewart, who created and marketed the idea of a high-powered homemaker for women who no longer wanted to be homemakers."

Stewart herself had some scalding things to say about it, as well as a few positive ones in an interview she gave to the New York Times, including: "Those last scenes with me looking like a lonely old lady walking hunched over in the garden? Boy, I told him to get rid of those. And he refused. I hate those last scenes. Hate them." She also called the movie's second half "a bit lazy". Then on the favorable side, she said, "I love the first half of the documentary. It gets into things that many people don’t know anything about, which is what I like about it."
