= Dear... (TV series) =

Documentary television series by R. J. Cutler

- Promotional poster
- Genre: Documentary
- Created by: R. J. Cutler
- Inspired by: "Dear Apple" ad campaign by Apple Inc.
- Starring: Spike Lee; Lin-Manuel Miranda; Stevie Wonder; Oprah Winfrey; Gloria Steinem; Big Bird; Jane Goodall; Aly Raisman; Yara Shahidi; Misty Copeland; Billy Porter; Malala Yousafzai; Laird Hamilton; Jane Fonda; Viola Davis; Sandra Oh; André Leon Talley; Ava DuVernay; Kareem Abdul-Jabbar; Selena Gomez
- Country of origin: United States
- No. of seasons: 2
- No. of episodes: 20

Production
- Executive producers: R. J. Cutler; Todd Lubin; Jay Peterson; Jane Cha; Lyle Gamm; Donny Jackson
- Running time: 30 minutes
- Production companies: Matador Content; Cutler Productions

Original release
- Network: Apple TV+
- Release: June 5, 2020 – March 10, 2023

Dear... is a documentary television series created by R. J. Cutler. The series premiered on June 5, 2020 on Apple TV+.

== Premise ==
Dear... is inspired by the "Dear Apple" advertising campaign, where customers share stories about how Apple products have changed their lives. In the same vein, this docuseries features celebrities reading letters by people "whose lives have been changed through their work." Each episode focuses on one celebrity.

== Episodes ==
Dear... series overview
Season	Episodes	Originally released	
Season	Episodes	First released	Last released
1	10	June 5, 2020	
2	10	March 4, 2022	March 10, 2023

=== Season 1 (2020) ===
No. overall	No. in season	Featuring	Original release date
1	1	Spike Lee	June 5, 2020
2	2	Lin-Manuel Miranda	June 5, 2020
3	3	Stevie Wonder	June 5, 2020
4	4	Oprah Winfrey	June 5, 2020
5	5	Gloria Steinem	June 5, 2020
6	6	Big Bird	June 5, 2020
7	7	Jane Goodall	June 5, 2020
8	8	Aly Raisman	June 5, 2020
9	9	Yara Shahidi	June 5, 2020
10	10	Misty Copeland	June 5, 2020

=== Season 2 (2022–23) ===
No. overall	No. in season	Featuring	Original release date
11	1	Billy Porter	March 4, 2022
12	2	Malala Yousafzai	March 4, 2022
13	3	Laird Hamilton	March 4, 2022
14	4	Jane Fonda	March 4, 2022
15	5	Viola Davis	March 4, 2022
16	6	Sandra Oh	March 4, 2022
17	7	André Leon Talley	March 4, 2022
18	8	Ava DuVernay	March 4, 2022
19	9	Kareem Abdul-Jabbar	March 4, 2022
20	10	Selena Gomez	March 10, 2023

== Release ==
In January 2020, Apple announced Dear..., to be executive produced by R. J. Cutler. The first season was released on June 5, 2020 on Apple TV+.

In March 2021, the series was renewed for a 9-episode second season, featuring Billy Porter, Malala Yousafzai, Laird Hamilton, Jane Fonda, Viola Davis, Sandra Oh, André Leon Talley, Ava DuVernay, and Kareem Abdul-Jabbar, to premiere March 4, 2022.
