= R. J. Cutler =

American film director

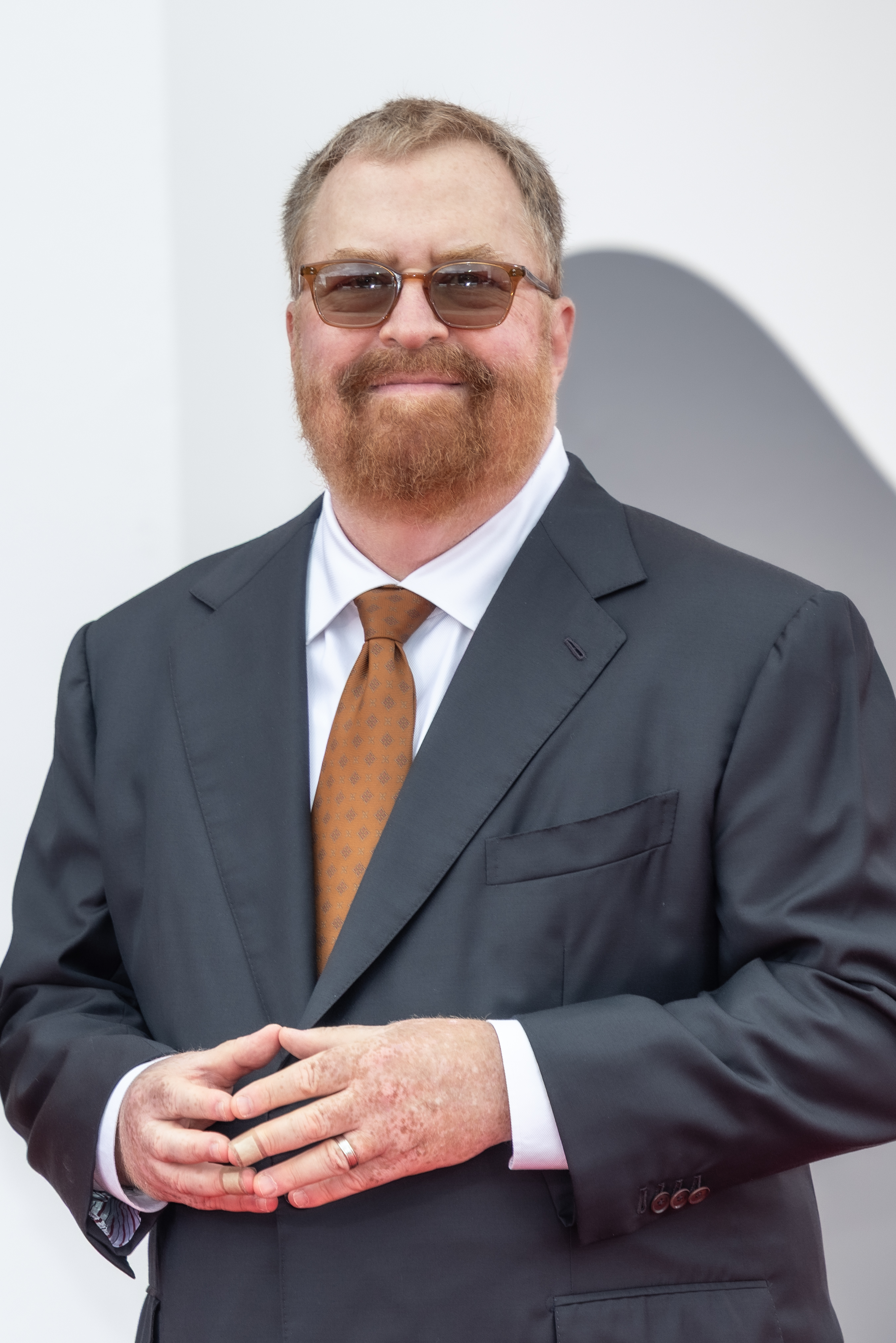
- Cutler in 2025
- Born: 1962 (age 63–64); United States
- Occupations: Filmmaker, television producer, documentarian, theater director

R. J. Cutler (born 1962) is an American director and producer. His films and television projects include The War Room, A Perfect Candidate, American High, The September Issue, Listen to Me Marlon, Belushi, Billie Eilish: The World's a Little Blurry, Martha, Elton John: Never Too Late, Fight for Glory: The 2024 World Series, Marc by Sofia and BTS: The Return.

Cutler's work has received two Academy Award nominations, numerous Emmy Award nominations and wins, a Writers Guild of America Award nomination, and has earned a Peabody Award, and the National Board of Review Award for Best Documentary. In 2009, the Museum of Television and Radio held a five-day retrospective of his work. In 2021, he received the D.A. Pennebaker Award at The Critics’ Choice Documentary Awards for Lifetime Achievement in Documentary Film. In 2026 he was officially inducted into the Silver Circle Honor Society by the National Academy of Television Arts & Sciences.

== Early life ==
Robert Jason Cutler (known as R. J. since birth) grew up in Great Neck, New York. As a 14-year-old, Cutler was commissioned to spend several days with the remaining leaders of the Yippie Party, and to write a story about their underground newspaper and their plans to disrupt the upcoming 1976 Democratic Convention. The resulting article, "Behind the Scenes at Yipster Times," was published in the May/June 1976 issue of Alternative Journalism Review.

Cutler graduated from Great Neck North Senior High School in 1979 and from Harvard University in 1983. He received his AB degree with a Special Concentration in Dramatic Theory and Literature. He was the recipient of the Hoopes Prize.

== Early career ==
Cutler began his career as a theater director, working in the mid-1980s as a director and producer at the American Repertory Theatre under the leadership of Robert Brustein. Cutler then became director James Lapine’s assistant on the original Broadway production of the Sondheim/Lapine musical Into the Woods. In 1988, he directed the workshop production of Jonathan Larson’s first musical Superbia at Playwrights Horizons.

Productions directed by Cutler between 1988 and 1990 include the premiere of Right Behind the Flag by Kevin Heelan at Playwrights Horizons, the American premiere of Emerald City by David Williamson at New York Theatre Workshop, and the premiere of The Secret Garden by Marsha Norman and Lucy Simon at Virginia Stage Company.

In 1990, Cutler produced the National Public Radio program Heat with John Hockenberry. The show received a Peabody Award.

== Filmmaking ==
Cutler first turned to filmmaking as the producer of The War Room, a feature documentary directed by D. A. Pennebaker and Chris Hegedus that chronicles Bill Clinton’s 1992 presidential campaign. The War Room premiered at the Toronto International Film Festival in September 1993 and was subsequently screened at the New York Film Festival and the Berlin International Film Festival. It won the National Board of Review Award for Best Documentary and was nominated for an Academy Award for Best Documentary Feature.

The War Room (1993) holds a 96 percent approval rating on Rotten Tomatoes and earned praise as “a valuable time-capsule and a riveting study in the art of politicking.” In 2013, the Cinema Eye Honors presented The War Room with its Legacy Award, “intended to honor classic films that inspire a new generation of filmmakers.”

In April 1996, Cutler and co-director David Van Taylor made A Perfect Candidate, a documentary following the U.S. Senate campaign of Oliver North. The film was released theatrically by Seventh Art Releasing and aired on the PBS series POV. It was nominated for an Emmy Award. In 2013, The Washington Post included both A Perfect Candidate and The War Room on its list of “Best Political Movies Ever.”

In 2000, Cutler created American High, a “nonfiction drama,” a form of documentary serial storytelling that was new to American network television. In the wake of the 1999 Columbine shootings, Cutler and his team spent a school year filming fourteen high-school students outside Chicago and provided them with cameras to record “video diaries.” The thirteen-episode series premiered on Fox in 2000 and was described by The Nation as “a vivid and affecting slice of life on the verge,” and by the New York Daily News as “absolutely riveting.” Fox canceled the series after four episodes, citing low ratings as it aired opposite the premiere season of CBS’s Big Brother.

The following year, PBS broadcast American High twice. During its run, viewership among 12- to 24-year-olds surged, as did traffic to its website. Cutler later reflected, “Rescuing American High by taking it to PBS was very satisfying. I’m as proud of that as anything I’ve ever done.” American High won the 2001 Primetime Emmy Award for Outstanding Nonfiction Program. It was nominated again in 2002, when PBS aired the series in its entirety.

In 2007, Cutler spent eight months filming Vogue editor Anna Wintour and her staff as they produced what was then the largest single issue of a magazine ever published. The September Issue, directed and produced by Cutler, premiered at the 2009 Sundance Film Festival, where it received the Grand Jury Prize for Cinematography. The film later won the 2010 Cinema Eye Honors Audience Choice Award. Distributed theatrically by Roadside Attractions, The September Issue grossed more than US$6 million worldwide, ranking it among the top 30 highest-grossing documentaries in U.S. box-office history. The film holds an 83% rating on Rotten Tomatoes and was described by Entertainment Weekly as “dishy, glitzy, vibrant, and sensationally fun.”

In the 2010s, Cutler helped to create and executive produce the television drama series Nashville, and directed the pilot and second episode. Nominated for a Writers Guild of America Award for Best New Series, Nashville aired on ABC and CMT from 2012 to 2018. Cutler also directed the feature film If I Stay and created, wrote, directed, and produced the weekly podcast The Oval Office Tapes (2018).

Cutler continued his work in feature documentaries and nonfiction series, producing and directing The World According to Dick Cheney (2013), producing the documentary Listen to Me Marlon (2015), and creating and executive producing the series Dear… (2020) for Apple TV+.

== Production company ==
In 2020, Cutler launched his production company This Machine Filmworks with the backing of Industrial Media (now Sony Pictures Television Nonfiction).

Following the launch of This Machine Filmworks, Cutler directed two of the company's earliest feature documentaries: Belushi (2020), about comedian John Belushi, and Billie Eilish: The World's a Little Blurry (2021). The latter follows Eilish for a year beginning shortly before her 17th birthday, documenting the writing, production, and recording of her debut album with her brother Finneas in their family home in Highland Park, Los Angeles. The film received multiple News & Documentary Emmy Award nominations, was shortlisted for the Academy Award for Best Documentary Feature, and was longlisted for both the BAFTA Award for Best Documentary and the Grierson Award for Best Music Documentary. Billie Eilish: The World's a Little Blurry holds a 96% rating on Rotten Tomatoes. Owen Gleiberman of Variety wrote that the film "reinvents the music-film form by turning teenage vulnerability and creative process into something grandly cinematic," while TheWrap described it as "an intimate epic that changes what we expect from a music documentary—a film about creation, not celebrity." The film has also been featured in media studies courses at Boston University and the University of Arizona.

In 2023, This Machine also produced The Disappearance of Shere Hite, directed by Nicole Newnham. The documentary premiered at the Sundance Film Festival before its theatrical release and examines the life and legacy of feminist author and sex educator Shere Hite.

In 2024, Cutler directed, wrote, and produced the Netflix documentary Martha, which has a 90% rating on Rotten Tomatoes and was nominated for two Emmys and a WGA award. Variety described it as “a transfixing saga,” while The Guardian called it “hilarious, piercing, and unexpectedly moving.” People magazine noted that “fans can’t stop talking about the emotional honesty and humor of the film.” As of June 2025, Martha had been streamed more than 22 million times worldwide for a total of 40.7 million viewing hours.

In 2025, Cutler directed the Apple TV+ documentary series Fight for Glory: 2024 World Series, which chronicles the 2024 World Series with unprecedented behind-the-scenes access in partnership with Major League Baseball, Imagine Documentaries, and Cap 2 Productions.

In May 2025, Netflix released the This Machine documentary Karol G: Tomorrow Was Beautiful. Directed by Cristina Costantini, the film debuted at No. 1 on Netflix’s Daily Top Ten film chart in the United States, and appeared in the Top 10 in 27 countries.

That same year This Machine released Lee Soo Man: The King of K-Pop, documenting the career of SM Entertainment founder Lee Soo-man, and debuted the Prime Video documentary series Esports World Cup: Level Up, following competitors during the inaugural Esports World Cup in Saudi Arabia also directed by Cutler.

In August 2025, New York's Paris Theater hosted a two-night program titled "Martha, Billie and Anna: Portraits by R. J. Cutler", screening three of his documentaries.

In September 2025, the Venice Film Festival premiered This Machine’s feature documentary Marc by Sofia, Sofia Coppola’s first documentary film, which explores her longtime creative collaboration with designer Marc Jacobs.

In 2026, This Machine released BTS: The Return, directed by Bao Nguyen, documenting the group's reunion following completion of their mandatory military service.

== Personal life ==
Cutler lives in Los Angeles, with his wife, producer Jane Cha Cutler and their three children.

== Style and influences ==
Cutler has cited Jim Bouton’s book Ball Four as an early influence on his story-telling and interest in non-fiction. He listed his Best Movies Ever for Newsweek as Oliver Stone’s Wall Street, Elia Kazan’s On the Waterfront, Woody Allen’s Crimes and Misdemeanors, Preston Sturges’ The Lady Eve, Bob Fosse’s All That Jazz, Terrence Malick’s Badlands, Barbara Kopple’s Harlan County, USA and Sidney Lumet’s Dog Day Afternoon.

While making The September Issue Cutler was influenced by Robert Drew’s Crisis, the Maysles Brothers’ Gimme Shelter, George Cukor’s Philadelphia Story and Preston Sturges’ The Lady Eve.

== Filmography ==
=== Films ===
Year	Title	Director	Producer	Awards N=Nominee, W=Winner
1993	The War Room	No	Yes	Academy Award (N), National Board of Review (W), Cinema Eye Legacy Award (W)
1996	A Perfect Candidate	Yes	Yes	Emmy (N)
2006	Thin	No	Yes (EP)	IDA (N), Grierson Award (W)
2009	The September Issue	Yes	Yes (also EP)	Sundance Cinematography (W), Cinema Eye Audience Award (W)
2013	The World According to Dick Cheney	Yes	Yes (also EP)	
2014	If I Stay	Yes	No	People’s Choice (N)
2015	Listen to Me Marlon	No	Yes	Emmy (N), Peabody Award (W), BAFTA (N)
2020	Belushi	Yes	Yes	Critics’ Choice (N)
2021	Billie Eilish: The World's a Little Blurry	Yes	Yes	Academy Award Shortlist, BAFTA Longlist, Grierson Shortlist, Cinema Eye Honors (N), Critics’ Choice (N)
2023	The Disappearance of Shere Hite	No	Yes	Cinema Eye Honoree (N)
2023	South to Black Power	No	Yes	
2023	Anthem	No	Yes	
2024	Elton John: Never Too Late	Yes	Yes	Academy Award Best Song (N), BAFTA Longlist, Grammy (N), Hollywood Music In Media Awards (W)
2024	Martha	Yes	Yes	Emmy Best Doc (N), Emmy Writing (N), WGA (N), Grierson Shortlist
2025	Karol G: Tomorrow was Beautiful	No	Yes	Hollywood Music In Media Award (N)
2025	Lee Soo Man: King of K-Pop	No	Yes	
2025	Marc by Sofia	No	Yes	
2026	BTS: The Return	No	Yes	

=== Television ===
Year	Title	Director	Producer	Awards N=Nominee, W=Winner
2000	American High	Yes	Yes (EP)	Emmy (W), GLAAD (N)
2002	Military Diaries	No	Yes (EP)	IDA (N)
2003	The Residents	Yes	Yes (EP)	
2003	Freshman Diaries	Yes	Yes (EP)	IDA (N)
2004	American Candidate	No	Yes (EP)	
2005	Bound for Glory	No	Yes (EP)	
2005–2008	30 Days	No	Yes (EP)	Television Academy Honors (W), PGA (N), GLAAD (W)
2005	Making Dazed	No	Yes (EP)	
2012	One Nation Under Dog	No	Yes (EP)	Television Academy Honors (W)
2012	Nashville	Yes	Yes (EP)	WGA (N), People’s Choice (N)
2020	Dear...	No	Yes (EP)	Imagen (W), Critics Choice Real TV (N)
2022	Supreme Models	No	Yes (EP)	Telly Award (Silver) (W)
2022	Elton John Live: Farewell from Dodger Stadium	No	Yes (EP)	Emmy (W)
2023	Murf the Surf	Yes	Yes (EP)	MovieGuide Awards (N)
2023	Big Vape	Yes	Yes (EP)	Emmy (W), Critics’ Choice (N), RealScreen Awards (N)
2024	Fight for Glory: 2024 World Series	Yes	Yes (EP)	
2025	Esports World Cup: Level Up	Yes	Yes (EP)	

=== Podcasts ===
Year	Title	Director	Producer	Awards N=Nominee, W=Winner
2018	The Oval Office Tapes	Yes	Yes (EP)	Webby Award (W)

== Bibliography ==
- Gladstone, Brooke and Bob Garfield (July 30, 2004). "American Candidate". On the Media.
