= Spin Doctors discography =

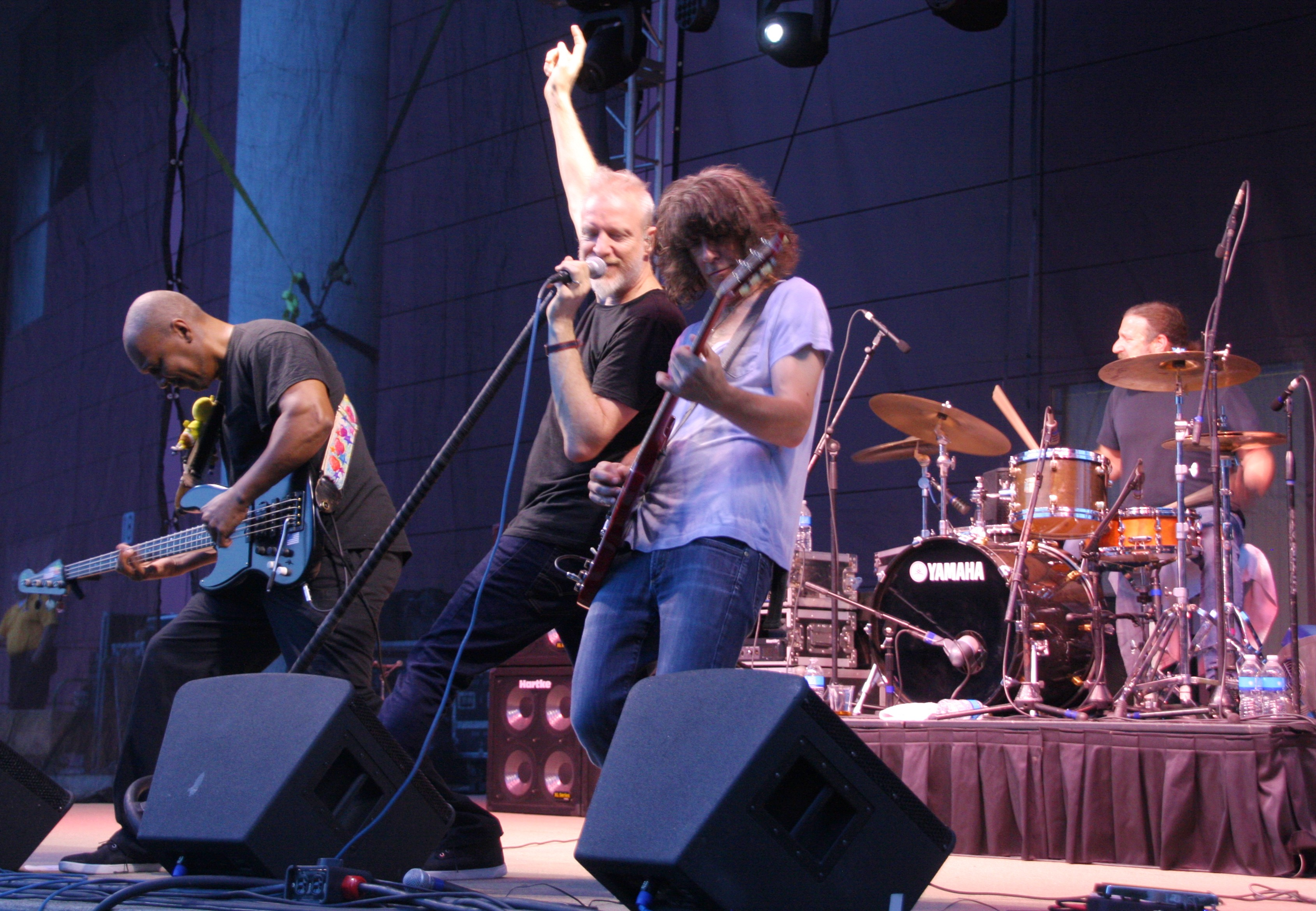
- the Spin Doctors performing in 2017
- Studio albums: 7
- Live albums: 3
- Compilation albums: 4
- Singles: 14

The discography of the Spin Doctors, an American rock band, consists of seven studio albums, three live albums, four compilation albums, and fourteen singles.

== Albums ==
=== Studio albums ===
Title	Year	Peak chart positions								Certifications
Title	Year	US	AUS	GER	NOR	NLD	NZ	SWE	UK	Certifications
Pocket Full of Kryptonite	1991	3	1	5	2	13	1	4	2	RIAA: 5× Platinum; ARIA: Platinum; BVMI: Gold; BPI: Platinum; MC: 4× Platinum
Turn It Upside Down	1994	28	120	31	16	64	45	—	3	RIAA: Platinum; MC: Gold
You've Got to Believe in Something	1996	—	—	93	—	—	—	—	—	
Here Comes the Bride	1999	—	—	—	—	—	—	—	—	
Nice Talking to Me	2005	—	—	—	—	—	—	—	—	
If the River Was Whiskey	2013	—	—	—	—	—	—	—	—	
Face Full Of Cake	2025	—	—	—	—	—	—	—	—	

=== Live albums ===
Title	Year	Peak chart positions	
Title	Year	US	GER
Up for Grabs...Live	1991	—	—
Homebelly Groove...Live	1992	145	30
Songs from the Road	2015	—	—

=== Compilation albums ===
Title	Year
Just Go Ahead Now: A Retrospective	2000
Can't Be Wrong	2001
Two Princes – The Best Of	2003
Collections	2007

== Singles ==
List of singles, with selected chart positions and certifications, showing year released and album name
Title	Year	Peak chart positions												Certifications	Album
Title	Year	US	US$	US Main.	US Pop	AUS	CAN	GER	ICE	NLD	NZ	SWE	UK	Certifications	Album
"Little Miss Can't Be Wrong"	1992	17	—	2	12	16	47	32	10	28	5	—	23		Pocket Full of Kryptonite
"Two Princes"	1993	7	3	2	1	3	2	3	1	3	4	1	3	ARIA: Gold; BVMI: Gold; BPI: Platinum; RMNZ: 2× Platinum	Pocket Full of Kryptonite
"Jimmy Olsen's Blues"	1993	78	73	8	34	86	—	—	—	—	23	—	40		Pocket Full of Kryptonite
"What Time Is It"	1993	—	—	26	—	106	52	—	—	—	—	—	56		Pocket Full of Kryptonite
"How Could You Want Him"	1993	102	—	28	—	—	47	—	21	—	—	—	—		Pocket Full of Kryptonite
"Have You Ever Seen the Rain?"	1994	—	—	—	—	—	—	73	4	—	—	—	—		Philadelphia (soundtrack)
"Cleopatra's Cat"	1994	84	66	22	—	134	59	—	—	—	26	—	29		Turn It Upside Down
"You Let Your Heart Go Too Fast"	1994	42	26	8	22	127	12	—	14	—	—	—	66		Turn It Upside Down
"Mary Jane"	1994	—	—	—	—	—	—	—	29	—	—	—	55		Turn It Upside Down
"She Used to Be Mine"	1996	—	—	—	—	—	—	—	—	—	—	—	55		You've Got to Believe in Something
"The Bigger I Laugh the Harder I Cry"	1999	—	—	—	—	—	—	—	—	—	—	—	—		Here Comes the Bride
"Can't Kick the Habit"	2005	—	—	—	—	—	—	—	—	—	—	—	—		Nice Talking to Me
"Still a Gorilla"	2025	—	—	—	—	—	—	—	—	—	—	—	—		Face Full Of Cake
"Boombox"	2025	—	—	—	—	—	—	—	—	—	—	—	—		Face Full Of Cake

=== Other appearances ===
- An Epic Tour De Force (promo, 1993) – "What Time is It?" and a special live version of "Jimmy Olsen's Blues" recorded at MTV Drops the Ball '93.
- So I Married an Axe Murderer (soundtrack, July 1993) – "Two Princes" from Pocket Full of Kryptonite
- Stone Free: A Tribute to Jimi Hendrix (tribute, Nov 1993) – "Spanish Castle Magic"
- Philadelphia (soundtrack, Dec 1993) – "Have You Ever Seen the Rain?"
- Space Jam (soundtrack, Nov 1996) – "That's the Way (I Like It)" from You've Got to Believe in Something
- Sandra Boynton's Dog Train (children's compilation, 2005) – "Tantrum"
- Grandma's Boy (soundtrack, 2006) – "Can't Kick the Habit" from Nice Talking to Me

The band's best known track, "Two Princes", also appears on a wide variety of 1990s music and alternative rock compilations.
