= Just Go Ahead Now: A Retrospective =

Compilation album by Spin Doctors
- Released: October 24, 2000
- Recorded: 1990–1996
- Genre: Rock
- Length: 73:32
- Label: Epic
- Producer: Bruce Dickinson (compilation), Frank Aversa, Peter Denenberg, Frankie La Rocka, Spin Doctors

Spin Doctors chronology
Here Comes the Bride (1999)	Just Go Ahead Now: A Retrospective (2000)	Nice Talking to Me (2005)

Just Go Ahead Now: A Retrospective is the first official compilation album by American jam band Spin Doctors, released in October 2000.

== Track listing ==
All tracks are written by Chris Barron, Aaron Comess, Eric Schenkman, and Mark White, except where noted.

No.	Title	Writer(s)	Length
1.	"Jimmy Olsen's Blues"		4:37
2.	"Little Miss Can't Be Wrong"		3:54
3.	"What Time Is It?"		4:50
4.	"How Could You Want Him (When You Know You Could Have Me?)"		5:00
5.	"Two Princes"		4:17
6.	"Cleopatra's Cat"		4:04
7.	"You Let Your Heart Go Too Fast"		3:49
8.	"Indifference"	Kelly, Schenkman	4:23
9.	"Big Fat Funky Booty"		4:15
10.	"Hungry Hamed's"		5:11
11.	"House"		3:54
12.	"I Can't Believe You're Still With Her"	Barron, Comess, Krizan, White	3:44
13.	"If Wishes Were Horses"	Barron, Comess, Krizan, White	4:31
14.	"She Used to Be Mine"	Barron, Comess, Kiner, Krizan, White	3:34
15.	"Miss America"	Barron, Comess, Krizan, White	3:32
16.	"You've Got to Believe in Something"	Barron, Comess, Krizan, White	4:01
17.	"Refrigerator Car" (Live, recorded June 12, 1992)		5:35

Notes

- Tracks 1–5 originally released on Pocket Full of Kryptonite, 1991
- Tracks 6–10 originally released on Turn It Upside Down, 1994
- Tracks 11–14 & 16 originally released on You've Got to Believe in Something, 1996
- Track 12 originally released on You've Got to Believe in Something, 1996 – different ending
- Track 17 originally released on Homebelly Groove...Live, 1992
- Track 15 originally released on "She Used to Be Mine" cd single

== Personnel ==
- Chris Barron – vocals
- Aaron Comess – percussion, conga, drums, Hammond organ, background vocals
- Eric Schenkman – guitar, piano, vocals (Tracks 1–10,17)
- Mark White – bass
- Anthony Krizan – guitar, vocals (Tracks 11–16)

Additional musicians

- John Bush – conga
- Robin Clark – background vocals
- Babi Floyd – background vocals
- Frank Floyd – background vocals
- Diva Gray – background vocals
- Jeremy Gross – backmasking
- Biz Markie – vocals, track 11
- John Popper – harmonica, background vocals
- Bernie Worrell – keyboards

Production

- Producers: Bruce Dickinson (compilation), Frank Aversa, Peter Denenberg, Frankie La Rocka, Spin Doctors
- Mastering: Joseph M. Palmaccio
- A&R Coordination: Patty Matheny and Darren Salmeri
- Packing Manager: John Christiana
- Art direction: Howard Fitzson
- Photography: Ken Scheles, Steve Eichner, Paul LaRaia, Starfile, Melis Van Iperen/Retna, AJ Barrett/Retna
- Cover Photo: Steve Eichner
