= If Wishes Were Horses =

If Wishes Were Horses may refer to:

== Film and television ==
- If Wishes Were Horses (Star Trek: Deep Space Nine), a 1993 episode of the American science fiction television series
- If Wishes Were Horses (Doctors), a 2023 episode of the British television soap opera
- Murder 101: If Wishes Were Horses, a 2007 made-for-television mystery film
- "If Wishes Were Horses", a 1976 episode (S7 E24) of Medical Center
- "If Wishes Were Horses", a 1980 episode (S3 E5) of All Creatures Great and Small
- "If Wishes Were Horses", a 2021 episode (S2 E3) of Truth Be Told directed by Dawn Wilkinson
- If Wishes Were Horses, a 1976 television drama special written and directed by Pen Densham
- "If Wishes Were Horses", a 2004 episode (S3 E4) of The Inspector Lynley Mysteries
- "If Wishes Were Horses", a 2023 episode (S1 E2) of Hansika's Love Shaadi Drama
- "If Wishes Were Horses", a 2000 episode (S35 E9) of Land and Sea
- If Wishes Were Horses, a 2002 movie featuring Danielle Hampton, Jefferson Brown (as Del), Pat Mastroianni (as Jerome), and Matt Austin (actor) (as Toby and second assistant director)

== Music ==
- If Wishes Were Horses (album), 1997, by Sweeney Todd
- "If Wishes Were Horses", a song on 1996 studio album You've Got to Believe in Something and 2000 compilation album Just Go Ahead Now: A Retrospective by Spin Doctors
- If Wishes Were Horses, a 2016 solo album by Kris Drever on which Ian Carr (guitarist) collaborated
  - Its title track, which won Best Original Song in the 2017 BBC Radio 2 Folk Awards
- "If Wishes Were Horses", a song by Lucinda Williams on 2008 album Little Honey
- "Little Boy/If Wishes Were Horses", a song by Mike Settle on 1970 album Raindrops Keep Fallin' on My Head by Andy Williams
- If Wishes Were Horses, a 1992 album by Blueboy (band), catalog number 612 of Sarah Records
- "If Wishes Were Horses" / "Conquistador", a c. 1966–1968 single by The Monterays
- "If Wishes Were Horses", a song on 1972 LP Any Mother Doesn't Grumble by Mick Softley
- "If Wishes Were Horses", a song by Magnus Pelander on 2005 album Firewood by Witchcraft
- "If Wishes Were Horses", a song on 2007 album Crowd Favorites by Claire Lynch
- "If Wishes Were Horses", a song on 1998 album The Northeast Kingdom by Cheri Knight
- "If Wishes Were Horses", a song on 1967 album The First Edition by the First Edition
- "If Wishes Were Horses", a song by Bob Corbin on 1992 album Just Another Hill by Corbin/Hanner
- "If Wishes Were Horses", a song on 1971 album Guess Who by Slim Whitman
- "If Wishes Were Horses", a 2004 anti-war-on-terror song by David Baerwald
- If Wishes Were Horses, a 2026 something by Grant Maloy Smith that won the Indie Music Channel Award for Best Country Artist

== Literature ==
- If Wishes Were Horses, a 1994 novel by Francine Pascal
- "If Wishes Were Horses", a short story by Edythe Mae Gordon, republished in Harlem's Glory: Black Women Writing, 1900-1950
- If Wishes Were Horses, a 1996 book by W. P. Kinsella
- If Wishes were Horses, a 1929 volume of journalistic articles by H. W. Fowler
- "If Wishes Were Horses...", a short story by Tony Isabella and Bob Ingersoll, published in The Ultimate Super-Villains: New Stories Featuring Marvel's Deadliest Villains (1996)
- If Wishes Were Horses, a 2002 novel by Judith Duncan
- If Wishes Were Horses, a 2008 children's book in the Breyer Wind Dancers series by Sibley Miller
- If Wishes Were Horses, a 1958 standalone novel by Keith Robertson
- If Wishes Were Horses, a 1998 children's book by Anne McCaffrey
- If wishes were horses, a 1996 poetry collection by Harris Khalique
- If Wishes were Horses, a 1969 novel by Eunice Buckley

== Other arts and media ==
- If Wishes Were Horses, a 1973 radio play by Yulisa Pat Amadu Maddy
- If Wishes Were Horses, a play written by Anju Makhija and directed by Anahita Uberoi
- "If wishes were horses...", a 2013 solo show/exhibit by Willie Cole

== See also ==
- If wishes were horses, beggars would ride, a 1605 nursery rhyme
- If Wishes Were Horses Beggars Could Ride, a 1947 book by Eva Christy
- Riding Beggar Press, founded by John P. Jacob during the 1980s
