= Up for Grabs...Live =

Live album by Spin Doctors
- Released: January 1991
- Recorded: September 27, 1990
- Venue: Wetlands (New York City)
- Length: 40:23
- Label: Epic
- Producer: Peter Denenberg; Frankie La Rocka

Spin Doctors chronology
Up for Grabs...Live (1991)	Pocket Full of Kryptonite (1991)

Professional ratings
Review scores
Source	Rating
AllMusic	3/5 stars

Up for Grabs...Live is the first live album by American rock band Spin Doctors, released in 1991. It is also their first release.

== Track listing ==
All tracks are written by Spin Doctors

No.	Title	Length
1.	"Big Fat Funky Booty"	6:55
2.	"At This Hour"	6:05
3.	"Freeway of the Plains/Lady Kerosene"	10:41
4.	"Yo Mamas a Pajama"	3:53
5.	"Little Miss Can't Be Wrong"	4:51
6.	"Rosetta Stone"	7:58

Notes

- Studio versions of tracks 1 and 2 appear on their 1994 album Turn It Upside Down; a studio version of track 5 appeared later in 1991 on Pocket Full of Kryptonite.
- Tracks 3, 4 and 6 were later incorporated into the band's Homebelly Groove...Live album.

== Personnel ==
- Chris Barron – lead vocals
- Eric Schenkman – guitar, backing vocals
- Mark White – bass
- Aaron Comess – drums

Production

- Peter Denenberg – producer, mixing, engineer
- Frankie La Rocka – producer
- Karen Kuehn – photography
- Paul LaRaia – photography
