= Homebelly Groove...Live =

Live album by Spin Doctors
- Released: November 24, 1992
- Recorded: September 27, 1990; June 12, 1992
- Length: 77:25
- Label: Epic
- Producers: Aaron Comess, Peter Denenberg, Frankie La Rocka, Eric Schenkman, Spin Doctors

Spin Doctors chronology
| Pocket Full of Kryptonite (1991) | Homebelly Groove...Live (1992) | Turn It Upside Down (1994) |

Professional ratings
Review scores
| Source | Rating |
|---|---|
| AllMusic | 3/5 stars |
| Calgary Herald | A |
| Music Week | 3/5 stars |
| Select | 1/5 medals |

Homebelly Groove...Live is the second live album, and third release overall, by American jam band Spin Doctors, released in 1992.

Tracks 4, 5, and 6 are from a free radio concert for WNEW-FM, recorded at Lonestar Roadhouse in New York City on June 12, 1992. The remaining tracks were recorded on September 27, 1990 at Wetlands, New York City; tracks 2, 9, and 10 originally appeared on the band's EP Up for Grabs...Live. An additional track from the Lonestar Roadhouse show, a performance of "What Time Is It?" featuring John Popper of Blues Traveler on harmonica, was released as the B-side of the single "Little Miss Can't Be Wrong."

== Track listing ==
All tracks are written by Spin Doctors.

| No. | Title | Length |
|---|---|---|
| 1. | "What Time Is It?/Off My Line" | 12:19 |
| 2. | "Freeway of the Plains/Lady Kerosene" | 10:53 |
| 3. | "Yo Baby" | 5:50 |
| 4. | "Little Miss Can't Be Wrong" | 4:42 |
| 5. | "Shinbone Alley" | 8:13 |
| 6. | "Refrigerator Car" | 6:20 |
| 7. | "Sweet Widow" | 11:38 |
| 8. | "Stepped on a Crack" | 5:13 |
| 9. | "Yo Mamas a Pajama" | 4:06 |
| 10. | "Rosetta Stone" | 8:07 |
| Total length: | | 77:25 |

== Personnel ==
- Chris Barron – lead vocals
- Eric Schenkman – guitar, backing vocals, lead vocals on "Off My Line"
- Mark White – bass
- Aaron Comess – drums
- Roger Fox – flute on "Stepped on a Crack"

Production

- Producers: Aaron Comess, Peter Denenberg, Frankie La Rocka, Eric Schenkman, Spin Doctors
- Engineer: Peter Denenberg
- Mixing: Frankie La Rocka
- Mastering: Ted Jensen
- Photography: Paul LaRaia
- Art direction: Francesca Restrepo

== Charts ==
Album

| Year | Chart | Position |
|---|---|---|
| 1993 | The Billboard 200 | 145 |
