= You've Got to Believe in Something =

Studio album by Spin Doctors
- Released: May 14, 1996
- Recorded: 1995–1996
- Genres: Pop rock; funk rock
- Length: 55:12
- Label: Epic
- Producers: Peter Denenberg, Danny Kortchmar

Spin Doctors chronology
| Turn It Upside Down (1994) | You've Got to Believe in Something (1996) | Here Comes the Bride (1999) |

You've Got to Believe in Something is the third studio album by American rock band Spin Doctors, released in 1996. It is their first album without founding guitarist Eric Schenkman, who had left the band during the tour to support their previous studio effort. Schenkman was replaced by Anthony Krizan who co-wrote the album with the rest of the group. "She Used to Be Mine" was released as the lone single and was promoted with a video directed by Rich Murray who had also directed the video for the band's mega hit, "Two Princes". An excerpt from the song "If Wishes Were Horses" was used as the theme song for the sitcom Spin City in seasons 2 and 3. A cover of KC and the Sunshine Band's "That's the Way (I Like It)" featuring rapper Biz Markie is included as an unlisted bonus track, where an abriged edit and R&B remix of the cover would be featured a few months later on the soundtrack of the live-action animated sports comedy film Space Jam starring Michael Jordan and the Looney Tunes cast. The band later re-recorded the track "'bout a Train" on their 2013 album If the River Was Whiskey as "About a Train", with Schenkman having since returned to the band by then, in addition to being one of the band's final recordings with original bassist Mark White before he was fired from the band in 2022 for refusing to get the COVID-19 vaccine.

== Critical reception ==
Professional ratings
Review scores
| Source | Rating |
|---|---|
| AllMusic | 2.5/5 stars |
| Billboard | (positive) |
| Entertainment Weekly | C+ |
| Rolling Stone | 2/5 stars |

AllMusic's Stephen Thomas Erlewine critiqued that it lacked the "ingratiating charm" of Pocket Full of Kryptonite but had its "fair share of catchy moments", concluding that: "It just falls somewhere in the middle, which makes it a return to form, of sorts." Tony Scherman of Entertainment Weekly called it "an improvement over their sophomore flop," highlighting the "handful of fair-to-good tunes" ("She Used to Be Mine," "House," "Sister Sisyphus"), but felt the rest of the album avoids the "blue-eyed funk" format of their early hits. Jim DeRogatis, writing for Rolling Stone, said that the "musical experiments are limited to some ham-handed attempts at reggae," and criticized the "clunky cover" of "That's the Way (I Like It)".

== Track listing ==
All tracks are written by Chris Barron, Aaron Comess, Anthony Krizan, Mark White except as noted.

| No. | Title | Writer(s) | Length |
|---|---|---|---|
| 1. | "You've Got to Believe in Something" | | 4:02 |
| 2. | "House" | Barron, Comess, Eric Schenkman, White | 3:53 |
| 3. | "Dogs on a Doe" | | 5:12 |
| 4. | "I Can't Believe You're Still With Her" | | 3:44 |
| 5. | "She Used to Be Mine" | Barron, Comess, Krizan, White, Lewilda Kiner Jr. | 3:35 |
| 6. | "She's Not You" | | 5:06 |
| 7. | "To Make Me Blue" | | 3:33 |
| 8. | "'Bout a Train" | Barron, Comess | 5:25 |
| 9. | "Where Angels Fear to Tread" | | 4:02 |
| 10. | "If Wishes Were Horses" | | 4:29 |
| 11. | "Sister Sisyphus" | Barron, Comess, White, Christopher Gross, Arnie Lawrence, Jason Richardson | 4:06 |
| 12. | "That's the Way (I Like It)" (Unlisted Bonus Track) (featuring Biz Markie) | Harry W. Casey, Richard Finch | 5:27 |

Note

- Immediately following the bonus track, a brief passage from "I Can't Believe You're Still With Her" is played over and over on a kazoo as Tommy Chong objects.

== Personnel ==
Spin Doctors

- Chris Barron – lead vocals (all tracks), harmonica
- Anthony Krizan – guitar, backing vocals
- Mark White – bass
- Aaron Comess – drums

Additional musicians

- Tommy Chong – kazoo
- Babi Floyd – backing vocals (1, 4, 5, 10)
- Diva Gray – backing vocals (1, 5, 10)
- Bernie Worrell – keyboards (1, 5, 10)
- Robin Clark – backing vocals (1)
- Frank Floyd – backing vocals (1)
- John Bush – congas (5)
- Kevin Bents – keyboards (9)
- Frankie La Rocka – shaker (9)
- Arnie Lawrence – saxophone (11)
- Biz Markie – guest vocals (12)

Production

- Producers: Peter Denenberg, Danny "Kootch" Kortchmar
- Engineer: Peter Denenberg
- Assistant engineers: Derrick Garrett, Thom Leinbach, Robert L. Smith, Jr.
- Mastering: Ted Jensen
- Photography: Paul LaRaia
