= Lennie Sogoloff =

American jazz club owner

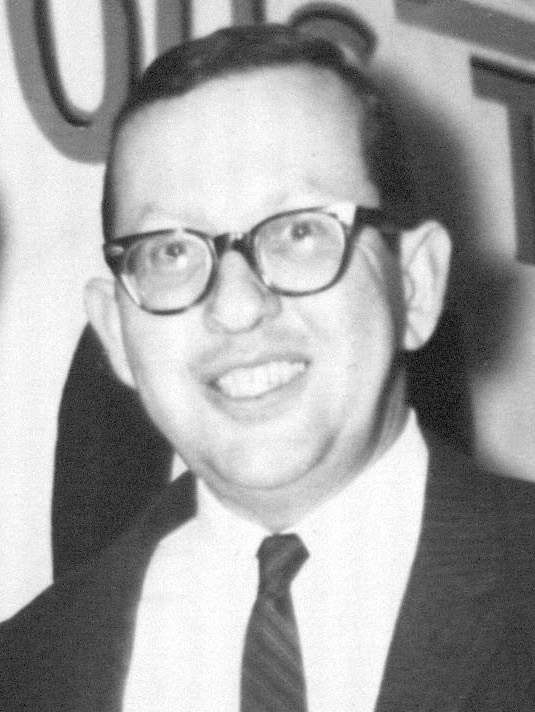
- Sogoloff c. 1963–1967
- Occupation: Music club owner
- Spouse: Barbara Anne Raby
- Children: 3
- Family: Chris Barron (nephew)

Leonard Sogoloff (November 24, 1923 – July 12, 2014) was a music club owner and jazz aficionado who owned and ran Lennie's on the Turnpike, a jazz club located on U.S. Route 1 North in Peabody, Massachusetts, from the mid-1950s to 1972. The Peabody location was lost in a fire in 1971 and the club was briefly located at a nearby Holiday Inn, and finally Village Green in Danvers.

Sogoloff's club originally presented a jukebox featuring jazz music, before live musicians started performing in 1963.

Live musical acts included Duke Ellington, Buddy Rich, Kris Kristofferson, Miles Davis, Dizzie Gillespie, and Stan Kenton.

Comedian Jay Leno performed opening acts for musicians at the club during his early career, from January 1972 to September 1972. In 2009, Leno donated $100,000 to Salem State College for a scholarship fund in honor of Sologff and his wife.

Sogoloff bequeathed his collection of memorabilia to Salem State University, including a number of photos.

== Personal life and death ==
Sogoloff died of pneumonia on July 12, 2014, in Marblehead, Massachusetts at the age of 90.

Sogoloff’s nephew is Chris Barron, the lead singer of the Spin Doctors.
