= Keone Young =

American actor

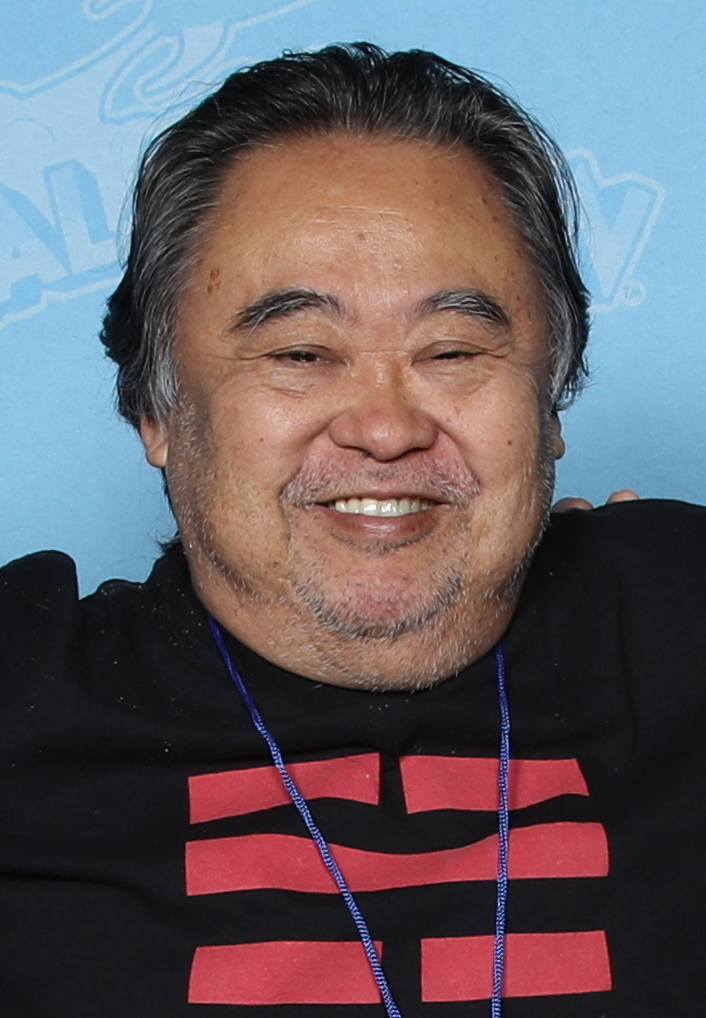
- Young at the 2019 GalaxyCon Raleigh
- Born: Keone Joseph Young; September 6, 1947 (age 79); Honolulu, Territory of Hawaii, U.S.
- Occupation: Actor
- Years active: 1967–present
- Spouse: Raihau Young (m. 2008)

Keone Joseph Young (born September 6, 1947) is an American actor. He is best known for his television roles as Dr. Michael Kwan in Kay O'Brien (1986), Mr. Wu in Deadwood (2004–06) and as the dual roles of Judge Robert Chong and Mr. Wan in The Young and the Restless (2007–10). His voice-over roles include Storm Shadow in G.I. Joe: A Real American Hero, Kaz in Hi Hi Puffy AmiYumi, Super Ninja in Karate Kommandos, and Luong Lao Shi in American Dragon: Jake Long.

== Early life ==
Young was born in Honolulu, Hawaii, to a Chinese father and Japanese mother, who were immigrant parents. His acting mentor was Mako.

== Career ==
He has been prolific in his character work and has made numerous guest appearances on such varied television series as Head of the Class, Diff'rent Strokes, The Golden Girls, Murphy Brown, Mad About You, Family Matters, Samurai Jack, Futurama, The Simpsons, My Life as a Teenage Robot, Cheers, Alias, JAG, Justice League, The Steve Harvey Show, Zeke and Luther, Shake It Up: Made In Japan and on the daytime soaps The Young and the Restless and Generations. He also portrayed the bodyguard of the Ancient One (Keye Luke) during the Asian Quarter storyline on General Hospital.

Young played Dr. Michael Kwan on the short-lived multi-ethnic medical drama Kay O'Brien, which aired in the fall of 1986 on CBS. Despite the fact that the network had high hopes for the series, just 9 of 13 episodes were aired. He was also a semi-regular on the HBO series Deadwood as Mr. Wu and played Henry Lin's Uncle on the FX series Sons of Anarchy. He also played Mr. Wu, unrelated to the Deadwood character, in the film Men in Black 3, and played the role of Ellison Onizuka In the TV film Challenger.

Young has many voice-over credits as well, including Kaz in Hi Hi Puffy AmiYumi and Luong Lao Shi in American Dragon: Jake Long.

Young also has several Star Trek links: he played Buck Bokai, a famous baseball player in the 24th century in the Star Trek: Deep Space Nine episode "If Wishes Were Horses". He also played Hoshi Sato's father in the Star Trek: Enterprise episode "Vanishing Point". Young appeared as Governor Ho in the film North starring Elijah Wood.

In theatre, Young has had a long history with the Asian-American theatre company, East West Players, in Los Angeles, where he not only performed but often served as producer.

In 2013, Young joined the cast of HBO's True Blood as Dr. Hido Takahashi, the man responsible for inventing the titular blood substitute.

== Filmography ==
=== Film ===
Year	Title	Role	Notes	Source
1976	Baby Blue Marine	Katsu		
1980	Private Benjamin	Kim Osaka		
1981	Eyewitness	Mr. Long's Son		
1982	Frances	Chinese Doctor		
1984	The Wild Life	Japanese Bowler		
1988	Alien Nation	Winter		
1989	Lost Angels	Atty. Victor Eng		
1989	Beverly Hills Bodysnatchers	Don Ho		
1989	Black Rain	Karaoke Singer		
1990	Fear	Detective William Wu		
1991	Shanghai 1920	Ming		
1992	Honeymoon in Vegas	Eddie Wong		
1993	Surf Ninjas	Baba Ram		
1994	Golden Gate	Benny Ying		
1994	My Girl 2	Daryl Tanaka		
1994	North	Governor Ho		
1995	The Brady Bunch Movie	Mr. Watanabe		
1996	Striptease	Ling		
1996	Jack	Dr. Lin		
1997	Bad Day on the Block	Ron the Repairman		
1997	Playing God	Mr. Ksi		
1998	At Sachem Farm	Mr. Tang		
2000	Dude, Where's My Car?	Mr. Lee the Chinese Tailor		
2001	Dr. Dolittle 2	Bee	Voice	
2003	Legally Blonde 2: Red, White & Blonde	Committee Clerk		
2004	The Tao of Pong	Lao Tzu	Short film	
2005	Mulan II	Lord Qin, additional voices	Voice, direct-to-video	
2006	Crank	Don Kim		
2006	Return to Halloweentown	Silas Sinister	Television film	
2006	Teen Titans: Trouble in Tokyo	Commander Uehara Daizo, Saico-Tek, Sushi Shop Owner	Voice, direct-to-video	
2009	Why Am I Doing This?	Ming		
2009	Scooby-Doo! and the Samurai Sword	Matsuhiro	Voice, direct-to-video	
2009	Crank: High Voltage	Don Kim		
2012	Men in Black 3	Mr. Wu		
2012	Stand Up Guys	Song		
2020	Night in Paradise	Kuto	Voice, English dub	
2021	Bright: Samurai Soul	Tsukuyomi	Voice, English dub	
2022	Inu-Oh	Teiichi	Voice, English dub	
2023	Wish	Mountain Climber, Tall Man Tourist, Guard #1	Voice	
2024	Ultraman: Rising	Dr. Onda	Voice	
2026	Avatar Aang: The Last Airbender	Avatar Roku	Voice	

=== Television ===
Year	Title	Role	Notes	Source
1969	Room 222	Howie Wong	Episode: "Naked Came We Into The World"	
1970	The Bill Cosby Show	Player #2	Episode: "This Mouth is Rated X"	
1972	Search	Nagada	Episode: "Short Circuit"	
1973	The Streets of San Francisco	Willard Lu – Cobra	Episode: "Trail of the Serpent"	
1974	Jerry	Morree Wu	Television film	
1974	Kojak	Oriental	Episode: "A Souvenir from Atlantic City"	
1976	Grady	Delivery Man	Episode: "The Weekend"	
1977	Police Story	Boy #1	Episode: "The Blue Fog"	
1978	Husbands, Wives & Lovers	Young Waiter	Episode: "The Women Strike"	
1981	I'm a Big Girl Now	Willie Wong	Episode: "With Becky You Get Eggroll"	
1982	Hart to Hart	Kim	Uncredited; Episode: "From the Depths of My Heart"	
1982	Diff'rent Strokes	David Cheung	Episode: "Hello, Daddy"	
1982	Bring 'Em Back Alive	Nakamoto Associate	Episode: "Seven Keys to Singapore"	
1982	The Fall Guy	Japanese Man	Episode: "Bail and Bond"	
1982	Taxi	The Japanese Man	Episode: "Alex Goes off the Wagon"	
1982	The Jeffersons	Maitre D'	Episode: "A Date with Danger"	
1982	Cheers	Tourist #1	Episode: "Coach Returns to Action"	
1983	Matt Houston	Spider	Episode: "The Rock and the Hard Place"	
1983	Hill Street Blues	Storeowner	Episode: "Here's Adventure, Here's Romance"	
1983	Girls of the White Orchid	Akira	Television film, also called Death Ride to Osaka	
1984	Buffalo Bill	Jerry Lewis Impersonator	Episode: "Jerry Lewis Week"	
1984	The Fall Guy	Mr. Soo	Episode: "Always Say Always"	
1984	Remington Steele	Winston Zakata, Mr. Moto	Episode: "Elementary Steele"	
1984	Scarecrow and Mrs. King	Jay Nigeta	Episode: "Remembrance of Things Past"	
1984	The Duck Factory		Episode: "The Duck Stops Here"	
1984–85	Challenge of the GoBots	Additional voices	65 episodes	
1984–86	G.I. Joe: A Real American Hero	Storm Shadow	Voice, 12 episodes	
1984–86	Webster	Master Kuan, Giuseppe	3 episodes	
1985	Challenge of a Lifetime	Dr. Honowa	Television film	
1985	St. Elsewhere	Hong	2 episodes	
1985	Magnum, P.I.	Mickey	Episode: "Old Acquaintance"	
1985	Lady Blue	Trang	Episode: "The Widow Maker"	
1985	Scarecrow and Mrs. King	Stanley Chow	Episode: "Welcome to America, Mr. Brand"	
1985	Jem	Additional voices	Episode: "Battle of the Bands"	
1986	The New Adventures of Jonny Quest	Additional voices	Unknown episodes	
1986	The Centurions	Additional voices	64 episodes	
1986	Kay O'Brien	Dr. Michael Kwan	Main cast 12 episodes	
1986	Chuck Norris: Karate Kommandos	Super Ninja	Voice, 5 episodes	
1987	Head of the Class	The Moderator	Episode: "The Russians Are Coming, the Russians Are Coming!"	
1987	The Oldest Rookie	Bok Song	Episode: "A Game Effort"	
1987	21 Jump Street	Mr. Tran	Episode: "Christmas in Saigon"	
1988	Tour of Duty	Major Tung	Episode: "Paradise Lost"	
1988	Small Wonder	Dr. Chang	Episode: "The Rock Band"	
1988	Adventures of the Gummi Bears	Prince Yen-Moon	Voice, episode: "The Magnificent Seven Gummies"	
1988	DuckTales	Mung Ho	Voice, episode: "Time is Money: Part 2 - The Duck Who Would Be King"	
1988	Nightingales	Rick	Television film	
1989	Dear John	Mr. Yoshimura	Episode: "Dream Babe"	
1989	The Further Adventures of SuperTed	Additional voices	13 episodes	
1989	The Karate Kid	Additional voices	Episode: "My Brother's Keeper"	
1989	MacGyver	Zhao	Episode: "Children of Light"	
1989	The Golden Girls	Dr. Chang	Episode: "Sick and Tired: Part 2"	
1989	Trenchcoat in Paradise	Bob Kanuka	Television film	
1990	Challenger	Lt. Colonel Ellison Onizuka	Television film	
1990	Paradise	Mr. Lee	Episode: "Dust on the Wind"	
1990	Last Flight Out	Tung Sanh	Television film	
1990	Generations	Mr. Chu	7 episodes	
1990	Ann Jillian		Episode: "A Housewarming"	
1991	Dynasty: The Reunion	Mr. Woo	2 episodes Television miniseries	
1991	Family Matters	Fred Yamano	Episode: "A Pair of Ladies"	
1991	Mathnet	MBARI Rep	Episode: "Despair in Monterey Bay"	
1992	The Golden Girls	Mr. Tanaka	Episode; "Rose: Portrait of a Woman"	
1992	Civil Wars	James Endo	Episode: "Denise and De Nuptials"	
1992	MacGyver	Chung	Episode: "The Stringer"	
1993	The Untouchables		Episode: "Chinatown"	
1993	Star Trek: Deep Space Nine	Buck Bokai	Episode: "If Wishes Were Horses"	
1993	Mad About You	Al	Episode: "A Pair of Hearts"	
1993	Dead Before Dawn	James Young	Television film	
1993	Firestorm: 72 Hours in Oakland	Gerald Chong	Television film	
1994	The Byrds of Paradise	Mr. Lee	Episode: "Hair Today, Gone to Maui"	
1994	Captain Planet and the Planeteers	Additional voices	Episode: "Twilight Ozone"	
1994	Family Album	Private Investigator	Miniseries, 2 episodes	
1995	Get Smart	Prime Minister of Vanapopo	Episode: "Passenger 99"	
1995	Marker	Taki Machidomi	6 episodes	
1995	Here Come the Munsters	Ralph the Limo Driver	Television film	
1996	The Faculty	Mr. Takehama	Episode: "Carlos Garcia"	
1997	Murphy Brown	Master Hahn	Episode: "Desperate Times"	
1997	Caroline in the City	Fong	2 episodes	
1998	Jenny	M.C.	Episode: "A Girl's Gotta Make Room for Daddy: Part 1"; credited as Keoni Young	
1998	Conrad Bloom	Mr. Chang	Episode: "Pilot"	
1998	Boy Meets World	Professor	Episode: "Ain't College Great?"	
1999	Smart Guy	Ted Shaw	Episode: "Cross Talk"	
1999	The Simpsons	Fish	Voice, episode: "Thirty Minutes over Tokyo"	
1999	Honey, I Shrunk the Kids: The TV Show	Master P'tui	Episode: "Honey, I'm Kung Fu Fighting"	
1999	Nash Bridges	Duke	Episode: "Kill Switch"	
2000	Baywatch	Kumu Pono	Episode: "Breath of Life"	
2000	Arliss		Episode: "Where There's a Will..."	
2000	Static Shock	Mr. Lee	Voice, episode: "Winds of Change"	
2000	NYPD Blue	Charlie Sung	Episode: "Goodbye Charlie"	
2000	Rip Girls	Bo	Television film	
2001	Batman Beyond	Dr. Ho	Voice, episode: "Countdown"	
2001	Curb Your Enthusiasm	Acupuncturist	Episode: "The Acupuncturist"	
2001	The Steve Harvey Show	Mr. Chin	Episode: "Principal's Pet"	
2001–05	Alias	Professor Choy	4 episodes	
2002	The Invisible Man	Loh Ming	Episode: "The Invisible Woman"	
2002	Justice League	Professor Arthur Chin	Voice, episode: "The Brave and the Bold"	
2002	King of the Hill	Additional voices	Voice, episode: "Returning Japanese"	
2002	Everwood	Gino	Episode: "The Great Doctor Brown"	
2002	Judging Amy	Judge	Episode: "Boys to Men"	
2002	Star Trek: Enterprise	Mr. Sato, Hoshi's father	Episode: "Vanishing Point"	
2003	Jackie Chan Adventures	Wing	Voice, episode: "A Night at the Opera"	
2003	The Even Stevens Movie	Chief Tuka	Television film	
2003	The Grim Adventures of Billy & Mandy	Quan Ti	Voice, episode: "Chicken Ball Z"	
2003	JAG	Police Officer	Episode: "Secret Agent Man"	
2003–17	Samurai Jack	Emperor (Young), Caveman #1, Dog Owner, Old Monk	Voice, 4 episodes	
2004	Will & Grace	Owner	Episode: "A Gay/December Romance"	
2004	The Powerpuff Girls	Server, Monk	Voice, episode: "Makes Zen to Me"	
2004	Super Robot Monkey Team Hyperforce Go!	Super Quasier, Monster Guard #1	Voice, 2 episodes	
2004	Strong Medicine	Mr. Fong	Episode: "Like Cures Like"	
2004	The Batman	Hideo Katsu	Voice, episode: "The Cat and the Bat"	
2004–06	Hi Hi Puffy AmiYumi	Kaz Harada, various voices	Voice, 39 episodes	
2004–06	Codename: Kids Next Door	Kani Sanban	Voice, 3 episodes	
2004–06	Deadwood	Mr. Wu	18 episodes	
2005	Lilo & Stitch: The Series	Lao Shi	Voice, episode: "Morpholomew"	
2005	Teen Titans	Katarou	Voice, episode: "The Quest"	
2005	House	Clyde Park	Episode: “Love Hurts”	
2005	NYPD Blue	Akira Nakada	Episode: "Moving Day"	
2005–07	American Dragon: Jake Long	Luong Lao Shi	Voice, 45 episodes	
2005–08	Avatar: The Last Airbender	Jeong Jeong, Captain Li, High Sage	Voice, 6 episodes	
2006	NCIS	Lee Song	Episode: "Light Sleeper"	
2006	The X's	Viper, Reporter	Voice, episode: "Wealth vs. Stealth/Wee House"	
2007	Ben 10	Ishiyama	Voice, episode: "Game Over"	
2007	In Case of Emergency	Mr. Tuckman	Episode: "Forbidden Love"	
2007	John from Cincinnati	The Chinaman	Episode: "His Visit: Day Nine"	
2007	Cold Case	Shinji Nakamura - 2007	Episode: "Family 8108"	
2007	Random! Cartoons	Flashback Lance, Flashback Zoopie	Voice, episode: "Squirly Town"	
2007–09	Phineas and Ferb	Additional voices	3 episodes	
2007–10	The Young and the Restless	Judge Robert Chong, Mr. Wan	15 episodes	
2008	The Mighty B!	Mr. Wu, additional voices	5 episodes	
2008	American Dad!	Chick Salesman	Voice, episode: "Pulling Double Booty"	
2008	Crash	Law Officer Paul Kim	2 episodes	
2009	The Unit	General Lao	Episode: "Bad Beat"	
2009	Numbers	Walter Yoon	Episode: "Trouble in Chinatown"	
2009	My Life as a Teenage Robot	Vacu-San, Howard, Guy #1	Voice, episode: "Samurai Vac/Turncoats"	
2009	Wolverine and the X-Men	Silver Samurai, Yakuza Ninja	Voice, episode: "Code of Conduct"	
2009	Batman: The Brave and the Bold	Operative	Voice, episode: "When OMAC Attacks!"	
2010	Zeke & Luther	Mr. Ng	Episode: "Crouching Zeke, Dancing Luther"	
2010	Glenn Martin, DDS	Master Linn	Voice, episode: "Tooth Fairy"	
2010	G.I. Joe: Renegades	Hard Master, Arata	Voice, episode: "Return of the Arishikage"	
2011	Mike & Molly	Abe	Episode: "Samuel Gets Fired"	
2011	Ben 10: Ultimate Alien	Julie's Dad	Voice, episode: "The Perfect Girlfriend"	
2011; 2019	Young Justice	Sensei	Voice, 2 episodes	
2012	Tron: Uprising	Additional voices	Episode: "Beck's Beginning"	
2012	Hemingway & Gellhorn	Mr. Ma	Television film	
2012	Shake It Up	Mr. Watanabe	Episode: "Made in Japan"	
2012–13	Naruto: Shippuden	Disonasu	Voice, 6 episodes; English dub	
2013	Kung Fu Panda: Legends of Awesomeness	Wu Yong	Voice, episode: "A Tigress Tale"	
2013	Sons of Anarchy	Bohai Lin	2 episodes	
2013	The Legend of Korra	Northern Tribe Soldier	Voice, episode: "Civil Wars"	
2013	True Blood	Hido Takahashi	5 episodes	
2013	Mad	Yashida, Superhero Announcer, Candy Clerk	Voice, episode: "Dullverine / Under the Dumb"	
2013	Kaijudo: Rise of the Duel Masters	Master Isao Okamoto	Voice, 8 episodes	
2014	NCIS: Los Angeles	Mr. Kim	Episode: "Fish Out of Water"	
2014	Turbo Fast	Maitre D'	Voice, episode: "Turbo Drift"	
2014	Franklin & Bash	Sato	Episode: "Good Cop/Bad Cop"	
2015	The Man in the High Castle	Field Marshal Shunroku Hata	Episode: "Kindness"	
2015	Rebels Recon	Commander Jun Sato	Voice, episode: "Inside 'The Lost Commanders'"	
2015	Star vs. the Forces of Evil	Elderly Japanese Driver	Voice, episode: "Diaz Family Vacation/Brittney's Party"	
2015–17	Star Wars Rebels	Commander Jun Sato	Voice, 17 episodes	
2016	Ultimate Spider-Man	Martin Li / Mr. Negative, Dragon Goon #2	Voice, episode: "Return to the Spider-Verse: Part 3"	
2016	Kevin Can Wait	Mr. Chu	Episode: "The Fantastic Pho"	
2016–17	Sofia the First	Wu-Chang	Voice, 2 episodes	
2017	Madam Secretary	Minister Byambyn Sendoo	Episode: "Gift Horse"	
2017	Queen of the South	Ki Moon	Episode: "El Precio de la Fe"	
2017	Death Battle!	Silver Samurai	Voice, episode: "Shredder vs. Silver Samurai"	
2017	Teenage Mutant Ninja Turtles	Jei, Samurai #1	Voice, 3 episodes	
2017	Be Cool, Scooby-Doo!	Mr. Vehara, Sumo	Voice, episode: "The Curse of Kaniaku"	
2017	DuckTales	Game Voice	Voice, episode: "Daytrip of Doom!"	
2018	Designated Survivor	Ambassador Dewan	Episode: "Bad Reception"	
2018	Archer	Additional voices	3 episodes	
2019	Teen Titans Go!	Katarou	Voice, episode: "Them Soviet Boys"	
2019	Deadwood: The Movie	Mr. Wu	Television film	
2019	Mom	George	Episode: "Chicken Hands and Toxic Narcissism"	
2020	Stumptown	Dwaddle Chen	Episode: "Reality Checks Don't Bounce"	
2021	Big City Greens	Mr. Sato	Voice, episode: "Rent Control"	
2021	Tom and Jerry Special Shorts	Chef	Voice, episode: "On a Roll"	
2021	Yasuke	Wardock Chef	Voice, episode: "A Long Road"	
2021	Godzilla Singular Point	Tsunetomo Yamamoto	Voice, English dub	
2021	Squid Game	Additional voices	English dub	
2021	Star Wars: Visions	Kamahachi, Troopers	Voice, English dub; short film: Akakiri	
2021–25	Record of Ragnarok	Sasaki Kojirō, Guan Yu, Fukurokuju, additional voices	Voice, English dub; 21 episodes	
2022	Samurai Rabbit: The Usagi Chronicles	Tetsujin, Hakai, Keisatsu, Person #2	Voice, 10 episodes	
2022	Grace and Frankie	Mr. Fujibayashi	Episode: "The Fake Funeral"	
2023	Monkie Kid	Jade Emperor	Voice, episode: "The Jade Emperor"	
2023	Blue Eye Samurai	Shindo Dojo Master	Voice, episode: "Hammerscale"	
2023	All Rise	Harry Park	3 episodes	
2023	Gremlins: Secrets of the Mogwai	Boss Chang, Fortune Telling Pigeon, Henchman 3, Henchman 4	Voice, recurring cast	
2024	Bob Hearts Abishola	Mr. Toronaga	Voice, episode: "Diamonds Are Made to Sparkle"	
2024	Code Geass: Rozé of the Recapture	Jugo Sumeragi	Voice, English version, episode: "Oborodzuki -Heji Mun-"	
2026	Star Wars: Visions Presents – The Ninth Jedi	Kwana	Voice; English version	

=== Video games ===
Year	Title	Role	Source
2002	Law & Order: Dead on the Money	Paul Kim	
2002	The Mark of Kri	Kuzo	
2003	Indiana Jones and the Emperor's Tomb	Ch'in Shi-Huang-Ti	
2003	Gladius	Additional voices	
2003	Law & Order II: Double or Nothing	Paul Kim	
2003	True Crime: Streets of LA	Big Chong, Jimmy Fu	
2004	Doom 3	Additional voices	
2004	Men of Valor	Captain Van Bao	
2005	Vampire: The Masquerade – Bloodlines	Lu Fang	
2005	Project Snowblind	Sgt. Major Chung	
2005	Red Ninja: End of Honor		
2005	SWAT 4	Hyun Jun Park	
2005	Rainbow Six: Lockdown		
2005	True Crime: New York City		
2006	X-Men: The Official Game	Silver Samurai	
2006	Red Steel		
2007	Spider-Man 3	Mr. Chen	
2008	Ninja Gaiden II	Joe Hayabusa	
2008	Fracture		
2009	Ninja Gaiden Sigma 2	Joe Hayabusa	
2010	Alpha Protocol	Ronald Sung	
2011	Rage	Coffer, Norbu	
2012	Ninja Gaiden 3	Joe Hayabusa	
2012	World of Warcraft: Mists of Pandaria	Chen Stormstout	
2013	Dead Island: Riptide	Marvin	
2015	Heroes of the Storm	Chen Stormstout	
2016	Fallout 4: Far Harbor	Kenji Nakano	
2017	Batman: The Enemy Within	Rumi Mori	
2020	Ghost of Tsushima	Additional voices	
2023	Like a Dragon Gaiden: The Man Who Erased His Name	Yao	
2024	Like a Dragon: Infinite Wealth	Additional voices	
2025	Like a Dragon: Pirate Yakuza in Hawaii	Additional voices	
