= The Forsaken (Star Trek: Deep Space Nine) =

- Star Trek: Deep Space Nine episode
- Episode no.: Season 1 Episode 17
- Directed by: Les Landau
- Story by: Jim Trombetta
- Teleplay by: Don Carlos Dunaway; Michael Piller
- Production code: 417
- Original air date: May 24, 1993

Guest appearances
- Majel Barrett as Ambassador Troi; Constance Towers as Ambassador Taxco; Michael Ensign as Ambassador Lojal; Jack Shearer as Ambassador Vadosia; Benita Andre as Anara

Episode chronology
← Previous "If Wishes Were Horses"	Next → "Dramatis Personae"
- Star Trek: Deep Space Nine season 1

"The Forsaken" is the 17th episode of the American science fiction television series Star Trek: Deep Space Nine.

Set in the 24th century, the series follows the adventures on Deep Space Nine, a space station located near a stable wormhole between the Alpha and Gamma quadrants of the Milky Way Galaxy, in orbit of the planet Bajor. In this episode, Dr. Julian Bashir is assigned "babysitting" duty for four visiting ambassadors, Chief Miles O'Brien deals with an alien computer program downloaded from a probe, and Odo copes with a deeply infatuated Lwaxana Troi.

This episode aired in broadcast syndication on May 24, 1993.

== Casting ==
This episode cast Majel Barrett as the flirtatious Ambassador Troi (Lwaxana Troi), a character previously established on Star Trek: The Next Generation, and the mother of Deanna Troi (aka Counselor Troi). Majel Barrett was cast in many Star Trek shows, including the 1960s pilot, the original series (as nurse Christine Chapel), and as the voice of the ships computer in multiple shows.

Other guest stars include Constance Towers, Michael Ensign, Jack Shearer, and Benita Andre.

== Plot ==
Deep Space Nine is host to a delegation of Federation ambassadors, and Commander Benjamin Sisko gives Bashir the "honor" of welcoming them to the station. While Bashir struggles to please the other three dignitaries, Ambassador Lwaxana Troi exclaims that someone has stolen her brooch. Odo apprehends the thief, and Lwaxana is instantly infatuated with the Constable.

Later, Lwaxana comes to Odo's office to flirt with him. Odo is uncomfortable with her attention, and escapes on a pretext. In Sisko's office, Odo asks for advice on how to deal with Lwaxana's aggressive behavior, but Sisko is amused and offers no help.

Meanwhile, a mysterious probe-like vessel comes through the Wormhole. Dax and O'Brien attempt to analyze it, downloading its software to Deep Space Nine.

As Lwaxana follows Odo into a turbolift, he tries to rebuff her by telling her that he must revert to a liquid every sixteen hours, but she is undeterred. A system failure strands them together in the turbolift. As Lwaxana talks to keep her mind off the danger, Odo grows less hostile toward her, and soon opens up to her about his past. He is in severe discomfort, as he will soon need to revert to his liquid state.

While trying to repair the station's systems, O'Brien discovers that the computer is less hostile to him than usual, but it seems to break down whenever he is away from it. Dax and Kira infer that the information downloaded from the alien probe is a non-sentient life form, which has attached itself to O'Brien like a puppy.

The crew attempt to transfer the alien life form's files off the station, but something goes awry and a plasma surge creates a fire that endangers Bashir and the ambassadors. O'Brien finally decides to build a "doghouse" within the computer for their little lost "puppy." Containing it solves their problems.

Meanwhile, in the turbolift, Odo begins to lose control of his form. Lwaxana tries to be supportive, but he turns away and says no one has ever seen him this way. She takes off her wig and tells him no one has ever seen her that way either. As they bond over their shared moment of vulnerability, she lets Odo "melt" into her lap.

Bashir saves the ambassadors from the fire by hiding in a crawlspace. Upon emerging, they call him a hero. Odo and Lwaxana are rescued from the turbolift with a newfound appreciation for each other's company. Sisko agrees to allow O’Brien to “keep the puppy.”

== Reception ==
Reviewing the episode for The A.V. Club, Zack Handlen wrote: "In her way, Lwaxana is as much a misfit as Odo, whether by her choosing, or else by some fundamental aspect of her personality that drives her to make her choices. At the end of the episode, Lwaxana flirts one last time before walking off, and for once, the sight didn't make me flinch. She may not be the easiest person in the world to deal with, but some people are worth the effort." In 2013, Keith DeCandido gave the episode a rating of 6 out of 10 for Tor.com, writing: "The corridor explodes, everyone panics, we don't know what's happened, and then we find out that Bashir got them into a crawlway, and apparently they bonded while trapped in there, because they're all friends now. I would rather have been shown that than told it. (Although the look on Kira's face when she realizes that Bashir saved the day is priceless, and a particularly good example of how great Nana Visitor is with facial expressions.)"

In 2019, Io9 noted "The Forsaken" for pairing the characters Odo and Lwaxana.
