= Turn It Upside Down =

Studio album by Spin Doctors
- Released: June 14, 1994
- Recorded: March 1994
- Studio: Clinton, New York City
- Genre: Funk rock
- Length: 52:31
- Label: Epic
- Producer: Peter Denenberg; Frankie La Rocka; Spin Doctors

Spin Doctors chronology
| Homebelly Groove...Live (1992) | Turn It Upside Down (1994) | You've Got to Believe in Something (1996) |

Singles from Album
- 1. "Cleopatra's Cat" Released: 1994; 2. "You Let Your Heart Go Too Fast" Released: 1994; 3. "Mary Jane" Released: 1994

Professional ratings
Review scores
| Source | Rating |
|---|---|
| AllMusic | 2/5 stars |
| Robert Christgau | (1-star Honorable Mention) |
| Entertainment Weekly | B− |
| Music Week | 3/5 stars |
| Rolling Stone | 4/5 stars |
| Select | 1/5 medals |
| Smash Hits | 2/5 stars |

Turn It Upside Down is the second studio album and fourth release overall by American rock band Spin Doctors, released in 1994. It is the follow-up album to their successful RIAA 5× Platinum album Pocket Full of Kryptonite. Though not as commercially or critically successful as their debut album, Turn It Upside Down was certified Platinum in the US. It also yielded three minor hit singles—"Cleopatra's Cat", "Mary Jane" and "You Let Your Heart Go Too Fast"—in the UK, with lead single "Cleopatra's Cat" making the top 30 (No. 29). "You Let Your Heart Go Too Fast" was also a minor US hit, peaking at No. 42 and featured a video directed by Rich Murray.

== Track listing ==
All tracks are written by Spin Doctors except where noted.

| No. | Title | Writer(s) | Length |
|---|---|---|---|
| 1. | "Big Fat Funky Booty" | | 4:15 |
| 2. | "You Let Your Heart Go Too Fast" | | 3:49 |
| 3. | "Cleopatra's Cat" | | 4:04 |
| 4. | "Hungry Hamed's" | | 5:11 |
| 5. | "Biscuit Head" | | 4:19 |
| 6. | "Indifference" | Schenkman, Linda Kelly | 4:23 |
| 7. | "Bags of Dirt" | | 4:47 |
| 8. | "Mary Jane" | Barron, Bob Lewis | 3:41 |
| 9. | "More Than Meets the Ear" | | 3:55 |
| 10. | "Laraby's Gang" | Barron | 3:39 |
| 11. | "At This Hour" | | 3:53 |
| 12. | "Someday All This Will Be Road" | | 4:41 |
| 13. | "Beasts in the Woods" | | 4:34 |
| Total length: | | | 52:31 |

== Personnel ==
Spin Doctors

- Chris Barron – lead vocals, acoustic guitar on "Mary Jane"
- Eric Schenkman – guitar, lead vocals on "Indifference", backing vocals on "Bags of Dirt", piano on "More Than Meets the Ear"
- Mark White – bass
- Aaron Comess – drums, clavinet on "Big Fat Funky Booty", piano on "Mary Jane", organ on "Laraby's Gang"

Additional musicians

- Andrew Comess – organ on "You Let Your Heart Go Too Fast" and "Mary Jane"

Production

- Producers: Peter Denenberg, Frankie La Rocka, Spin Doctors
- Engineer: Peter Denenberg
- Mixing: Peter Denenberg
- Mastering: Ted Jensen

== Charts ==
| Chart (1994) | Peak position |
|---|---|
| Australian Albums (ARIA) | 120 |
| Austrian Albums (Ö3 Austria) | 23 |
| Dutch Albums (Album Top 100) | 64 |
| German Albums (Offizielle Top 100) | 31 |
| New Zealand Albums (RMNZ) | 45 |
| Norwegian Albums (VG-lista) | 16 |
| Swiss Albums (Schweizer Hitparade) | 19 |
| UK Albums (OCC) | 3 |
| US Billboard 200 | 28 |

== Certifications ==
| Region | Certification | Certified units/sales |
|---|---|---|
| Canada (Music Canada) | Gold | 50,000^{^} |
| United States (RIAA) | Platinum | 1,000,000^{^} |
^{^} Shipments figures based on certification alone.
