= Dramatis Personae (Star Trek: Deep Space Nine) =

- Star Trek: Deep Space Nine episode
- Episode no.: Season 1 Episode 18
- Directed by: Cliff Bole
- Written by: Joe Menosky
- Cinematography by: Marvin Rush
- Production code: 418
- Original air date: May 31, 1993

Guest appearances
- Jeff Pruitt as Ensign; Tom Towles as Hon'Tihl; Stephen Parr as Valerian; Randy Pflug as Guard

Episode chronology
← Previous "The Forsaken"	Next → "Duet"
- Star Trek: Deep Space Nine season 1

"Dramatis Personae" is the 18th episode of the first season of the American syndicated science fiction television series Star Trek: Deep Space Nine.

Set in the 24th century, the series follows the adventures on Deep Space Nine, a space station near the planet Bajor, adjacent to a stable wormhole leading to the distant Gamma Quadrant, as the Bajorans recover from a brutal occupation by the imperialistic Cardassians. In this episode, a "telepathic infection" sets the crew into two factions fighting against each other, with first officer Major Kira leading the mutiny.

== Plot ==
Major Kira believes a Valerian ship docked at the station is smuggling weapons to the Cardassians, but Commander Sisko refuses to detain the vessel without evidence. Before they can resolve their conflict, a damaged Klingon vessel arrives through the wormhole. One of its crew transports aboard Deep Space Nine as the ship explodes. The bloodied man whispers, "Victory!" and dies within seconds.

While investigating the explosion, Constable Odo suffers a seizure and collapses. When he awakens in the infirmary, Dr. Bashir hints deviously at potential trouble between Kira and Sisko. By now, Kira has found evidence of foul play among the Valerians, and informs Sisko of her intention to confiscate their cargo; he forbids her from doing so.

Meanwhile, Lt. Dax and Chief O'Brien take a runabout to find the Klingons' mission recorder and bring it back to the station. During their trip, O'Brien mentions the mounting tension and makes his loyalty to Sisko clear to a complacent Dax. Later, Kira attempts to win Dax's loyalty; however, Dax appears lethargic and only interested in reminiscing. Kira sees the bartender Quark attempting to eavesdrop, and violently attacks him.

Odo attempts to warn Sisko of parallels between the apparent bloody mutiny on the Klingon ship and what is now happening on the station. Sisko, however, has begun meticulously constructing a clock and cannot be bothered. Soon Kira solicits Odo's help in a plan to eliminate Sisko and O'Brien. He pretends to go along with her. Meanwhile, O'Brien plots with Sisko to escape the station and return with reinforcements to overthrow Kira.

Odo studies the Klingon log further, learning that the Klingons had discovered a collection of energy spheres with telepathic imprints of an ancient power struggle that destroyed a race known as the Saltah'na. Odo realizes that the imprint is affecting Deep Space Nine's senior staff, causing them to re-enact the power struggle that doomed the Saltah'na and the Klingon crew; Odo alone is unaffected. He visits Bashir again and pretends collaboration to co-opt him into finding a way to reverse the imprint.

Bashir finds a way to remove the telepathic influence from the crew and Odo plays on the trust of both Kira and Sisko to lure both sides into one of the cargo bays. There, Odo activates Bashir's cure, and a purple gas-like cloud emerges from the officers, who regain their senses. Odo opens the cargo bay doors, venting the cloud into space destroying the spheres and removing the telepathic imprint permanently. Sisko is left with his Saltah'na clock.

== Releases ==
This episode was released in 2017 on DVD with the complete series box set, which had 176 episodes on 48 discs.

== See also ==
- Dramatis personae ("persons of the drama", a literary/stage term)
