= Nice Talking to Me =

Nice Talking To Me

Studio album by Spin Doctors
- Released: September 13, 2005
- Recorded: 2003–2005
- Genre: Pop rock
- Length: 45:35
- Label: Ruff Nation
- Producer: Matt Wallace

Spin Doctors chronology
Just Go Ahead Now: A Retrospective (2000)	Nice Talking To Me (2005)	If the River Was Whiskey (2013)

Professional ratings
Review scores
Source	Rating
AllMusic	3/5 stars

Nice Talking to Me is the fifth studio album by American rock band Spin Doctors. It was released on September 13, 2005, and features the original four members of the band. The CD release was accompanied by a DVD, featuring a documentary short and several live performances filmed and directed by Rich Murray during their 2005 European tour.

== Production ==
The album was recorded in Los Angeles with producer Matt Wallace.

== Critical reception ==
The New York Times wrote that the album "has ripping funk guitar and upbeat melodies that will sound familiar to the Spin Doctors' fans." In a review of a live show to promote the album, the Hartford Courant wrote that Nice Talking to Me "tunes such as 'Margarita' actually offered some indication the band might still have some boing left in its coils."

== Track listing ==
No.	Title	Writer(s)	Length
1.	"Nice Talking to Me"	Barron, Comess, Schenkman, Matt Wallace, White	3:59
2.	"Sugar"	Barron, Comess, Schenkman, White	4:18
3.	"Margarita"	Barron	3:01
4.	"Happily Ever After"	Barron, Comess	3:21
5.	"I'd Like to Love You (But I Think You Might Be Crazy)"	Barron, Comess, Schenkman	5:03
6.	"Can't Kick the Habit"	Barron, Jeff Cohen, Joost Sweggers	8:16
7.	"My Problem Now"	Barron, Comess, Schenkman	3:19
8.	"Genuine"	Corky Laing, Schenkman	5:40
9.	"Tonight You Could Steal Me Away"	Barron, Schenkman	4:26
10.	"Safety Pin"	Barron, Schenkman	4:13

== Personnel ==
Spin Doctors

- Chris Barron – Lead vocals (except track 8), backing vocals, acoustic guitar on track 6
- Eric Schenkman – guitar, backing vocals on tracks 1, 2, 5, 8, 9 and 10, lead vocals on track 8
- Mark White – bass, backing vocals on track 2
- Aaron Comess – percussion, drums, background vocals on tracks 1 and 9

Additional musician

- Vince Jones – keyboard on tracks 1, 4, 6 and 7

Production

- Producers: Matt Wallace
- Engineers: Mike Landolt
- Additional engineering: Posie Mliadi, Pete Martinez (at Sound City)
- Mixing: Matt Wallace
- Recording: Sound City (Van Nuys, CA)
- Mastering: Brian Gardner
- Art direction: Julian Peploe
- Photography: Mike Waring, Chris Barron & Aaron Comess
