= If Wishes Were Horses (Star Trek: Deep Space Nine) =

- Star Trek: Deep Space Nine episode
- Episode no.: Season 1 Episode 16
- Directed by: Robert Legato
- Story by: Nell McCue Crawford; William L. Crawford
- Teleplay by: Nell McCue Crawford; William L. Crawford; Michael Piller
- Cinematography by: Marvin Rush
- Production code: 416
- Original air date: May 17, 1993

Guest appearances
- Keone Young as Buck Bokai; Rosalind Chao as Keiko O'Brien; Hana Hatae as Molly O'Brien; Michael J. Anderson as Rumpelstiltskin

Episode chronology
← Previous "Progress"	Next → "The Forsaken"
- Star Trek: Deep Space Nine season 1

"If Wishes Were Horses" is the 16th episode of the first season of the American syndicated science fiction television series Star Trek: Deep Space Nine.

Set in the 24th century, the series follows the adventures on Deep Space Nine, a space station located adjacent to a wormhole between the Alpha and Gamma quadrants of the galaxy, near the planet Bajor. In this episode, people's personal fantasies begin to manifest on the station. The episode's title is derived from the proverb "If wishes were horses, beggars would ride".

== Plot ==
The bartender Quark advises Constable Odo to lighten up, perhaps in a holosuite. Odo dismisses imagination as inattention to real life. Quark offers to create for him a shapeshifter "playmate", to which Odo retorts, "You're disgusting!" Seeing the station commander's young son, Jake Sisko, approaching a holosuite, Odo warns Quark he had better not have created any playmates for him. Quark explains that Jake's program includes famous baseball players from Earth.

Dr. Julian Bashir and Lt. Jadzia Dax eat lunch. Julian wants a romantic relationship, but Jadzia politely refuses, pointing out he has also eyed other women. Dax returns to Ops, where she observes elevated emissions in the nearby Denorios Belt. She and Commander Sisko hypothesize this to be due to the high amount of traffic at Deep Space Nine.

Chief O'Brien reads to his daughter Molly the story Rumpelstiltskin and tucks her into bed. Shortly, she comes out of her room and claims Rumpelstiltskin is inside. O'Brien and his wife Keiko patiently return with her and find that Rumpelstiltskin is indeed in her room. Elsewhere, a duplicate of Jadzia attempts to seduce Bashir in his quarters, and Buck Bokai, a 21st century baseball player who in 2026 broke Joe DiMaggio's hitting streak, has followed Jake from the holosuite.

The characters disappear when rejected or ignored. Unprecedented events, such as snow on the Promenade, occur across the station, apparently instigated by people's imaginations. Quark finds himself escorted by beautiful, adoring women, and hopes the situation will last forever, until he notices his customers are winning at Dabo. He desperately wishes them to lose, but to no effect: as Odo points out, Quark is outnumbered. Odo returns to his office, and discovers he has wished Quark into a holding cell.

The wishing outbreak continues until the emissions detected earlier form into a void near the station. It grows exponentially until Sisko realizes it is part of the wish effect, and will continue growing so long as people believe it exists. He instructs his crew that it does not exist, and to stand down from alert status. The crisis is averted. Later, "Buck Bokai" appears in Sisko's office, where he explains that he and the other fantasy apparitions are members of a mission of exploration that followed a ship through the wormhole. His people wanted to see what imagination is really about, in order to learn more about humanoids. The aliens did nothing themselves: they only observed the effects of humanoid imagination. Before leaving, he suggests they may one day return and tosses a baseball to Sisko as a parting gift.

== Production ==
The plot of the script evolved from its original draft when Michael Piller – co-creator of Star Trek: Deep Space Nine – wanted to differentiate the episode from a Star Trek: The Next Generation installment where a holosuite character comes to life, as such 'imagination' became the central theme of the episode. Another modification to the original script came from Colm Meaney's objection to the use of a Leprechaun due to, in his view, the negative connotations and stereotyping of Irish people. This influenced Piller to use the folk character Rumpelstiltskin instead, which during the re-write became the starting point of the new 'imagination' based story line for the episode.

== Reception ==
In 2020, ScreenRant ranked Buck Bokai the second best hologram in the Star Trek franchise.
