= If the River Was Whiskey =

Studio album by Spin Doctors
- Released: April 30, 2013
- Recorded: 2011–2013
- Studio: His House
- Genre: Blues rock
- Length: 43:23
- Label: Ruf
- Producer: Spin Doctors

Spin Doctors chronology
Nice Talking to Me (2005)	If the River Was Whiskey (2013)	Face Full of Cake (2025)

Professional ratings
Review scores
Source	Rating
AllMusic	4/5 stars

If the River Was Whiskey is the sixth studio album by American rock band Spin Doctors. The album was released on April 30, 2013, by Ruf Records.

The track "About a Train" first appeared on the band's 1996 album You've Got to Believe in Something. It was also the last album to feature original bassist Mark White, who was fired for refusing to receive the COVID-19 vaccine.

== Track listing ==
All tracks are written by Chris Barron, Aaron Comess, Eric Schenkman, and Mark White, except where noted.

No.	Title	Writer(s)	Length
1.	"Some Other Man Instead"	Barron, Comess, Schenkman, White, Arne Hovda, Erik Norvald Røe	4:35
2.	"If the River Was Whiskey"		3:17
3.	"Sweetest Portion"		4:02
4.	"Traction Blues"		3:42
5.	"Scotch and Water Blues"		5:16
6.	"About a Train"	Barron, Comess	6:14
7.	"The Drop"		4:40
8.	"Ben's Looking Out the Window Blues"		3:09
9.	"So Bad"		5:56
10.	"What My Love?"		2:32
Total length:			43:23

== Personnel ==
Credits adapted from the album's liner notes.

=== Spin Doctors ===
- Chris Barron – vocals, production, creative direction, iPhone photography
- Eric Schenkman – guitar, production, iPhone photography
- Mark White – bass, production, iPhone photography
- Aaron Comess – drums, production, iPhone photography

=== Additional contributors ===
- Roman Klun – recording, mixing
- Ted Jensen – mastering
- Jeff Norberg – art

== Charts ==
Chart (2013)	Peak position
US Top Blues Albums (Billboard)	5
