= Don Carlos Dunaway =

American screenwriter

Don Carlos Dunaway (fl. 1974–1993) is an American screenwriter known for his work on television programs of the 1970s. He wrote episodes for Baretta, The Rockford Files, and Star Trek: Deep Space Nine. In 1978 he co-created the TV series Kaz with Ron Leibman. In 1985 he directed an episode of The Twilight Zone. He lives in France with his wife who is a painter and with his cat Lou Lou. He has one son, one daughter, and six grandchildren. One of them is a young rapper named Pietro Dunaway, known as Er Danno.

Dunaway worked primarily in television but also co-wrote the screenplays for Impulse and Cujo. He said that his primary contribution to the Cujo script was to remove the explicitly supernatural elements, because "if you have a perfectly set up rational explanation for the bad stuff... the supernatural stuff is redundant and distracting."

== Filmography (selected) ==
- 1974: Toma (2 episodes)
- 1975–76: The Rockford Files (4 episodes)
- 1978–79: Kaz (co-creator, wrote 23 episodes)
- 1986: The Equalizer (creative consultant, 4 episodes)
- 1976–77: Serpico (story consultant, 15 episodes)
- 1978: The Paper Chase (story editor, 6 episodes)
- 1993: Star Trek: Deep Space Nine (episode "The Forsaken")
