= Here Comes the Bride (album) =

Studio album by Spin Doctors
- Released: June 1, 1999
- Genre: Pop rock
- Length: 57:54
- Label: Uptown/Universal
- Producer: Aaron Comess; Peter Denenberg; Spin Doctors

Spin Doctors chronology
You've Got to Believe in Something (1996)	Here Comes the Bride (1999)	Just Go Ahead Now: A Retrospective (2000)

Professional ratings
Review scores
Source	Rating
AllMusic	2.5/5 stars
Entertainment Weekly	B−
Rolling Stone	2.5/5 stars

Here Comes the Bride is the fourth studio album by the American rock band Spin Doctors, released in 1999.

== Track listing ==
All tracks are written by Chris Barron and Aaron Comess except where noted.

No.	Title	Writer(s)	Length
1.	"Here Comes the Bride"		3:13
2.	"Vampires in the Sun"		2:57
3.	"Waiting for the Blow"	Barron, Comess, Bennie Benjamin, Eddie Durham, Sol Marcus, Eddie Seiler	3:15
4.	"The Man"		3:50
5.	"Gone Mad"		4:19
6.	"Wow"	Barron, Comess, Ivan Neville	4:14
7.	"Siren Dress"		3:15
8.	"Gorilla Boy"	Barron	3:11
9.	"Key to the Kingdom"		4:04
10.	"Fisherman's Delight"		4:11
11.	"The Bigger I Laugh, the Harder I Cry"		3:26
12.	"Dodging Assassins"		3:11
13.	"Diamond"		3:47
14.	"Tomorrow Can Pay the Rent"	Barron	11:01
15.	"Let's Try Again" (hidden track, backmasked)

== Personnel ==
Spin Doctors

- Chris Barron – lead vocals
- Eran Tabib – guitar
- Mark White – bass on tracks 3–5, 8, 12 and 13
- Aaron Comess – drums, keyboards, bass on tracks 1, 2, 6, 7, 9–11, 14 and 15
- Ivan Neville – keyboards, backing vocals

Additional musicians

- Joe Bonadio – tambourine, hand drums
- Lani Groves – backing vocals
- Todd Horton – trumpet
- Arnie Lawrence – saxophone
- Andrew Lippman – trombone
- Catherine Russell – backing vocals
- Judith Talvi – cello

Production

- Producer: Aaron Comess
- Engineers: Peter Denenberg, Tom Fritze
- Mixing: Aaron Comess, Peter Denenberg
- Mastering: Ted Jensen
