= Mark White (bassist) =

American musician and activist (born 1962)

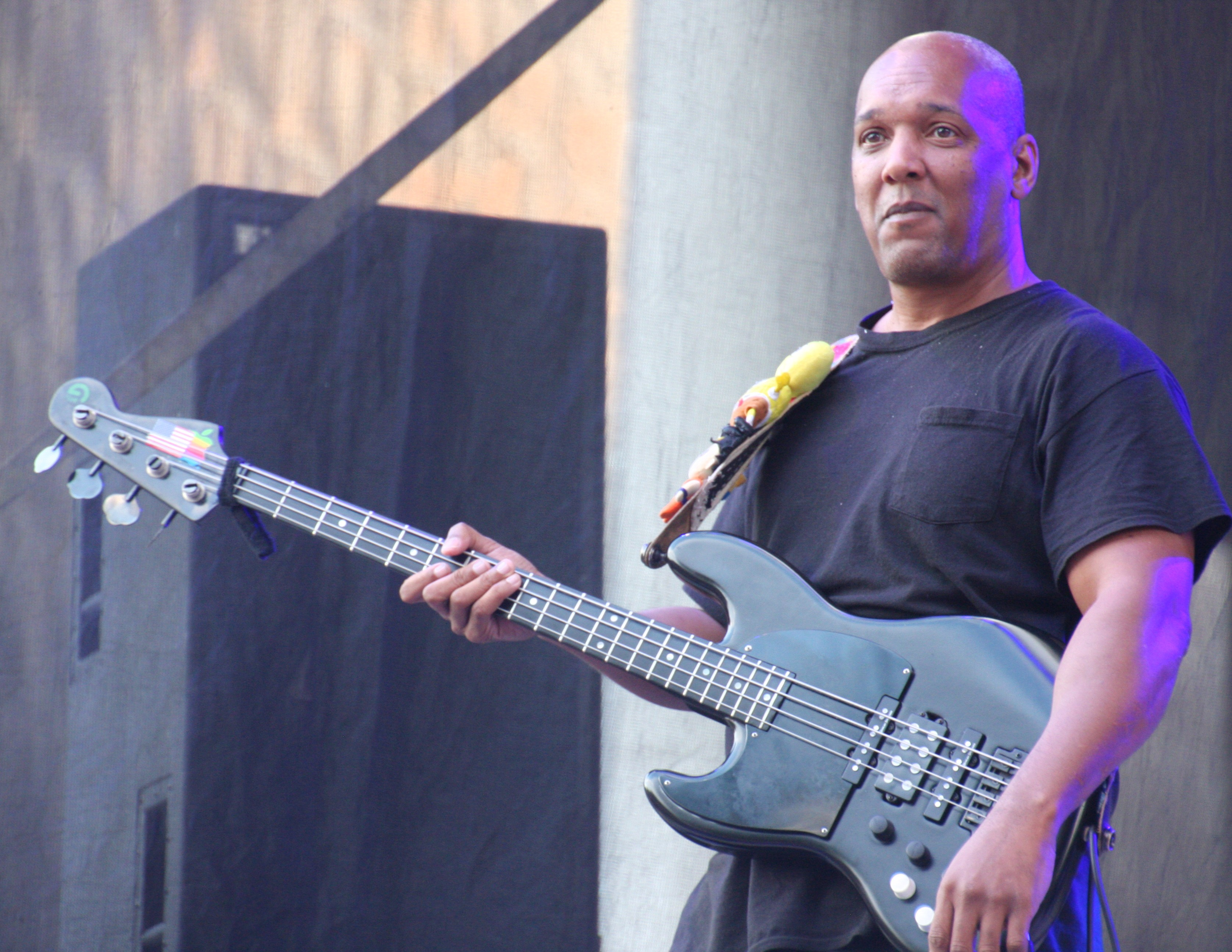
- White performing with the Spin Doctors in 2017

Background information
- Born: July 7, 1962 (age 64); The Bronx, New York, U.S.
- Genres: Alternative rock; funk rock; blues rock
- Occupation: Musician
- Instrument: Bass guitar
- Years active: 1988–present
- Formerly of: Spade; Spin Doctors; The Heavy Pets; Eight53

Mark White (born July 7, 1962) is an American bass player, best known as the former bassist for the rock band Spin Doctors. He has collaborated with many musical groups, including America's Got Talent finalists The Robotix, The Heavy Pets, Eight53, and the Free World Jazz Ensemble. As a songwriter and bass player, he also has been an active teacher in several high-profile rock and jazz schools, such as the Rockin' Robin Music Center in Houston, Texas.

White has also been an outspoken advocate for atheist rights, and was a keynote speaker at the American Atheists National Convention in Salt Lake City, Utah in 2014.

== Early life ==
Mark White was born on July 7, 1962, in the New York City borough of the Bronx to Joan and Earnest White. He spent his early years in the New York City area, eventually settling with his family in Queens where he eventually made a name for himself in New York underground music circles. His first bass guitar was a right-handed Epiphone.

== Early career ==
After being in a series of bands, White met up with Aaron Comess and participated in a group called Spade in 1988. This band was a mixture of funk and punk, highlighting White's fast, finger-plucking bass style and Comess's traditional jazz education from the New School for Jazz and Contemporary Music in New York City.

White quit Spade after a few months, but was asked to audition for a new opening in Trucking Company, a band originally started by John Popper. When Popper left to pursue his other band, Blues Traveler, Chris Barron (lead vocals) and Eric Schenkman (guitar, backing vocals) decided to continue Trucking Company with the addition of Aaron Comess, with whom they had studied at the New School.

== Spin Doctors ==
After White's audition and hiring, Trucking Company solidified into a much different style, in part because of White's eclectic musical background. Schenkman came up with the name, Spin Doctors to represent their new combined sound.

Spin Doctors recorded their first album, Pocket Full of Kryptonite in 1991, scoring two major hits with "Two Princes" and "Little Miss Can't Be Wrong", which peaked on the Billboard Hot 100 chart at No. 7 and No. 17, respectively. During the promotional tour of their second album, Turn It Upside Down, Schenkman left the band and was subsequently replaced by a string of session guitarists. White quit the Spin Doctors in 1999 and the bass tracks on the band's fourth album, Here Comes the Bride were completed by Comess. Soon after, the band stopped touring because Barron suffered from vocal fold paresis. In 2001, Barron and Schenkman put aside their differences for a one-time show at the historic venue the Wetlands before it closed permanently. White joined them for this reunion, which gradually turned into an unofficial reunion tour. This marked the beginning of the band's reformation. The reunited Spin Doctors went on to release the albums Nice Talking to Me in 2005 and If the River Was Whiskey in 2013 through RuffNation Records.

In 2022, White was fired by the band over his refusal to receive the COVID-19 vaccine. He is now an outspoken supporter of the MAGA movement.

== Political activism and community involvement ==
White has been an outspoken activist for the New Atheism movement, which promotes countering Christianity actively instead of just tolerating it. He has been a guest on atheist podcast Dogma Debate, and the Minnesota Atheists Radio Show, sharing his personal journey away from Christianity. He was also invited to be a keynote speaker for the American Atheists National Convention in 2014.

== Current musical and other artistic endeavors ==
White collaborated with artist Hersey and released an album titled "Neon Masquerade" in 2019. White also teaches private lessons out of the Rockin' Robin music center in Houston, Texas. He also plays bass for a variety of bands and genres. In October 2014 he had a stint with the piano rock grunge band Eight53.
