= Judith Duncan (novelist) =

Judith Duncan is a popular author of romance novels published primarily by Harlequin Enterprises between 1983 and 2002. During the period when Duncan was actively publishing, she lived and worked in Alberta, Canada. She based many of her books in this region. She has been heavily involved in local writers groups in a variety of roles. In particular, she has been active in the organisation and running courses designed to develop writing and publishing skills. She served as a Foundation member of the Alberta Romance Writer's Association, Vice-president of the Canadian Authors Association, and held a threeyear term with the Writers and Publishers Advisory Committee for Minister of Culture, Alberta.

== Awards ==
- 1990-91 Romantic Times Career Achievement Award - Innovative Series Romance

== Bibliography ==
- Tender Rhapsody. Harlequin Superromance no. 51, 1983 - ISBN 0-263-74497-3
- Hold Back the Dawn. Harlequin Superromance no. 77, 1983 - ISBN 0-263-74497-3
- Reach the Splendor. Harlequin Superromance no. 114, 1984 - ISBN 0-263-74854-5
- When Morning Comes. Harlequin Superromance no. 143, 1985 - ISBN 0-373-70143-8
- Into the Light. Harlequin Superromance no. 196, 1986 - ISBN 0-373-58450-4
- All That Matters. Harlequin Western Lovers: Ranchin' Dads no. 16, 1987- ISBN 0-373-88516-4
- Beginnings. Harlequin Superromance, no 291, 1988 - ISBN 0-373-57509-2
- Streets of Fire. Harlequin Superromance, no 407, 1990 - ISBN 0-373-70407-0
- A Risk Worth Taking. Silhouette Intimate Moments, no. 400, 1991 - ISBN 0-373-07400-X
- Better Than Before. Silhouette Intimate Moments, no. 421, 1992 - ISBN 0-373-58678-7
- A Special Request in To Mother with Love '93. Silhouette, 1993 - ISBN 0-373-48254-X
- Beyond All Reason. Silhouette Intimate Moments, no. 536, 1993 - ISBN 0-373-07536-7
- That Same Old Feeling. Silhouette Intimate Moments, no. 577, 1996 - ISBN 0-373-07577-4
- The Return of Eden Mccall. Silhouette Intimate Moments, no. 651, 1996 - ISBN 0-373-07651-7
- Driven to Distraction. Silhouette Intimate Moments, no. 704, 1997 - ISBN 0-373-07704-1
- Murphy's Child. Silhouette Intimate Moments, no. 946, 2000 - ISBN 0-373-07946-X
- Marriage of Agreement. Silhouette Intimate Moments, no. 975, 2000 - ISBN 0-373-07975-3
- The Renegade and the Heiress. Silhouette Intimate Moments no. 1114, 2002 - ISBN 0-373-27184-0
- If Wishes Were Horses. Silhouette Intimate Moments, no. 1072, 2002 - ISBN 0-373-27142-5
