= Sibley Miller =

American writer

Sibley Miller is the author of the Breyer Wind Dancers series of children's books, a fantasy series for early readers about magical horses with wings. The author also writes novels for teens, but used a pseudonym for this series.

== Bibliography ==
1. If Wishes Were Horses, Feiwel & Friends, 2008
2. Horse Happy, Feiwel & Friends, 2008
3. The Horse Must Go On, Feiwel & Friends, 2008
4. Horses' Night Out, Feiwel & Friends, 2008
5. Heads Up, Horses!, Feiwel & Friends, 2009
6. Horses Her Way, Feiwel & Friends, 2009
7. A Horse, Of Course!, Feiwel & Friends, 2009
8. Hungry as a Horse, Feiwel & Friends, 2009
9. A Horse’s Best Friend, Feiwel & Friends, 2011
10. Merry-Go-Horses, Feiwel & Friends, 2011
11. Horsey Trails, Feiwel & Friends, 2011
12. Magic Horses—or Not?, Feiwel & Friends, 2011
