= Pocket Full of Kryptonite =

Studio album by Spin Doctors
- Released: August 20, 1991
- Recorded: July–December 1990
- Studios: Power Station, New York City, New York; RPM, New York City, New York; ACME Recording, Mamaroneck, New York
- Genres: Funk rock; alternative rock
- Length: 50:30
- Label: Epic
- Producers: Frank Aversa; Peter Denenberg; Frankie LaRocka; Spin Doctors

Spin Doctors chronology
Up for Grabs...Live (1991)	Pocket Full of Kryptonite (1991)	Homebelly Groove...Live (1992)

Singles from Pocket Full of Kryptonite
- 1. "Little Miss Can't Be Wrong" Released: October 1992; 2. "Two Princes" Released: January 4, 1993; 3. "Jimmy Olsen's Blues" Released: 1993; 4. "What Time Is It?" Released: 1993; 5. "How Could You Want Him (When You Know You Could Have Me?)" Released: 1993

Professional ratings
Review scores
Source	Rating
AllMusic	4/5 stars
Calgary Herald	B
Chicago Tribune	3.5/4 stars
Christgau's Consumer Guide	(1-star Honorable Mention)
Music Week	3/5 stars
Q	4/5 stars
The Rolling Stone Album Guide	3/5 stars
Select	3/5 medals

Pocket Full of Kryptonite is the debut studio album by the American rock band Spin Doctors, released in August 1991.

Though the band had a small devoted fanbase, initial album sales of 60,000 units were mediocre for a major label act. By mid-1992 interest in the band grew after several radio stations started playing the single "Little Miss Can't Be Wrong". The combined strength of the single along with the follow-up song "Two Princes" led to the album's peaking at number 1 on the Billboard Top Heatseekers and number 3 Billboard 200 albums charts, respectively. It is the band's best selling album, and was certified 5× Platinum by the RIAA.

The album was remastered and reissued in 2011 as a 20th-anniversary edition, with a bonus track added to the original album and a second disc of demos previously released only on cassette, plus two live tracks.

The album's title is a quote from the opening track, "Jimmy Olsen's Blues".

== Track listing ==
=== Original album ===
All tracks are written by Spin Doctors except as noted.

No.	Title	Writer(s)	Length
1.	"Jimmy Olsen's Blues"		4:38
2.	"What Time Is It?"		4:50
3.	"Little Miss Can't Be Wrong"		3:54
4.	"Forty or Fifty"		4:23
5.	"Refrigerator Car"		4:46
6.	"More Than She Knows"	Eric Schenkman, Simon Lambert, Graham Clark, J.P. Fitting	2:12
7.	"Two Princes"		4:18
8.	"Off My Line"	John David Bell, Spin Doctors	3:58
9.	"How Could You Want Him (When You Know You Could Have Me?)"		4:59
10.	"Shinbone Alley/Hard to Exist"	Spin Doctors, John Popper	12:42
Total length:			50:30

Bonus tracks for European edition (Epic 468250 9)
No.	Title	Length
11.	"Yo Mamas a Pajama" (live, 1990-09-27 @ Wetlands Preserve, NY)	4:03
12.	"Sweet Widow" (live, 1990-09-27 @ Wetlands Preserve, NY)	11:38
13.	"Stepped on a Crack" (live, 1990-09-27 @ Wetlands Preserve, NY)	4:02
Total length:		70:13

2011 Anniversary edition disc 1 bonus track
No.	Title	Writer(s)	Length
11.	"Hard to Exist" (B-side of "How Could You Want Him" single)	Barron, Schenkman, Popper, Comess	4:29
Total length:			54:59

Notes

- The live tracks on the European release also appear on the live album Homebelly Groove...Live (1992), and were recorded September 27, 1990, at Wetlands Preserve in New York.

=== 2011 anniversary edition disc 2 ===
All tracks are written by Spin Doctors except as noted.

1989 "Can't Say No" Demo, recorded Aug 1989 Greene Street Studios, New York City
No.	Title	Writer(s)	Length
1.	"Jimmy Olsen's Blues"		5:13
2.	"Can't Say No"	Schenkman	2:20
3.	"Hard to Exist"	Barron, Schenkman, Popper, Comess	4:30
4.	"At This Hour"		5:37
5.	"40 or 50"		4:39
6.	"Big Fat Funky Booty"		4:00

1990 "Piece of Glass" Demo, recorded March 1990 RPM Studios, New York City
No.	Title	Writer(s)	Length
7.	"What Time Is It?"		4:08
8.	"How Could You Want Him (When You Know You Could Have Me?)"		5:44
9.	"Hungry Hamed's"		4:39
10.	"House"		4:19
11.	"Two Princes"		4:41
12.	"Refrigerator Car"		4:05
13.	"Rosetta Stone"		6:10
14.	"Freeway of the Plains"	Gregg Buscaglia, Barron, Schenkman, Popper, Fogel	5:48

Live tracks
No.	Title	Length
15.	"Turn it Upside Down" (Live July 19, 1993, Kingswood Music Theater, Toronto, Canada)	4:41
16.	"Little Miss Can't Be Wrong" (Live September 25, 1990, Continental Divide, New York City)	4:05
Total length:		75:15

== Personnel ==
Spin Doctors

- Chris Barron – lead vocals
- Eric Schenkman – guitar, backing vocals, lead vocals on "Off My Line", piano on "40 or 50"
- Mark White – bass
- Aaron Comess – drums, organ, backing vocals on "Little Miss Can't Be Wrong", congas on "40 or 50"

Additional musicians

- John Popper – harmonica on "More Than She Knows" and "Off My Line", backing vocals on "Two Princes"
- John Bush – tambourine on "Off My Line", congas on "How Could You Want Him (When You Know You Could Have Me)?"

Production

- Producers: Frank Aversa, Peter Denenberg, Frankie LaRocka, Spin Doctors
- Engineers: Frank Aversa, Peter Denenberg, Marc Schwartz, Spin Doctors
- Assistant engineers: Jeff Lippay, Motley
- Mixing: Peter Denenberg, Frankie La Rocka, Spin Doctors
- Mastering: Ted Jensen at Sterling Sound, NYC
- Production coordination: Jason J. Richardson
- Guitar technician: Joseph Miselis
- Equipment manager: John Darren Greene
- Art direction: Francesca Restrepo
- Photography: Paul Aresu, Paul LaRaia
- Cover art: Darren Greene, Chris Gross, Nicky Lindeman
- Liner notes: Cree McCree

== Charts ==
=== Weekly charts ===
Weekly chart performance for Pocket Full of Kryptonite
Chart (1992–1993)	Peak position
Australian Albums (ARIA)	1
Austrian Albums (Ö3 Austria)	3
Canada Top Albums/CDs (RPM)	1
Dutch Albums (Album Top 100)	13
Danish Albums (Hitlisten)	3
European Albums (European Top 100 Albums)	3
Finnish Albums (The Official Finnish Charts)	3
German Albums (Offizielle Top 100)	5
Hungarian Albums (MAHASZ)	33
Irish Albums (IRMA)	9
New Zealand Albums (RMNZ)	1
Norwegian Albums (VG-lista)	2
Swedish Albums (Sverigetopplistan)	4
Swiss Albums (Schweizer Hitparade)	7
UK Albums (Official Charts)	2
US Billboard 200	3
US Heatseekers Albums (Billboard)	1

=== Year-end charts ===
1993 year-end chart performance for Pocket Full of Kryptonite
Chart (1993)	Position
Australian Albums (ARIA)	17
Austrian Albums (Ö3 Austria)	33
Canadian Albums (RPM)	4
Dutch Albums (Album Top 100)	96
European Albums (European Top 100 Albums)	20
European Debut Albums (European Top 100 Albums)	3
German Albums (Offizielle Top 100)	33
New Zealand Albums (RMNZ)	12
Swiss Albums (Schweizer Hitparade)	33
UK Albums (OCC)	11
US Billboard 200	7

=== Decade-end charts ===
Decade-end chart performance for Pocket Full of Kryptonite
Chart (1990–1999)	Position
US Billboard 200	95

== Certifications ==
Certifications and sales for Pocket Full of Kryptonite
Region	Certification	Certified units/sales
Australia (ARIA)	Platinum	70,000^{^}
Austria (IFPI Austria)	Gold	25,000^{*}
Canada (Music Canada)	4× Platinum	400,000^{^}
France (SNEP)	Gold	100,000^{*}
Germany (BVMI)	Gold	250,000^{^}
New Zealand (RMNZ)	Gold	7,500^{^}
Sweden (GLF)	Gold	50,000^{^}
Switzerland (IFPI Switzerland)	Gold	25,000^{^}
United Kingdom (BPI)	Platinum	300,000^{^}
United States (RIAA)	5× Platinum	5,000,000^{^}
Summaries
Europe (IFPI)	Platinum	1,000,000^{*}
^{*} Sales figures based on certification alone.^{^} Shipments figures based on certification alone.
