= If wishes were horses, beggars would ride =

English proverb and nursery rhyme

"If wishes were horses, beggars would ride."
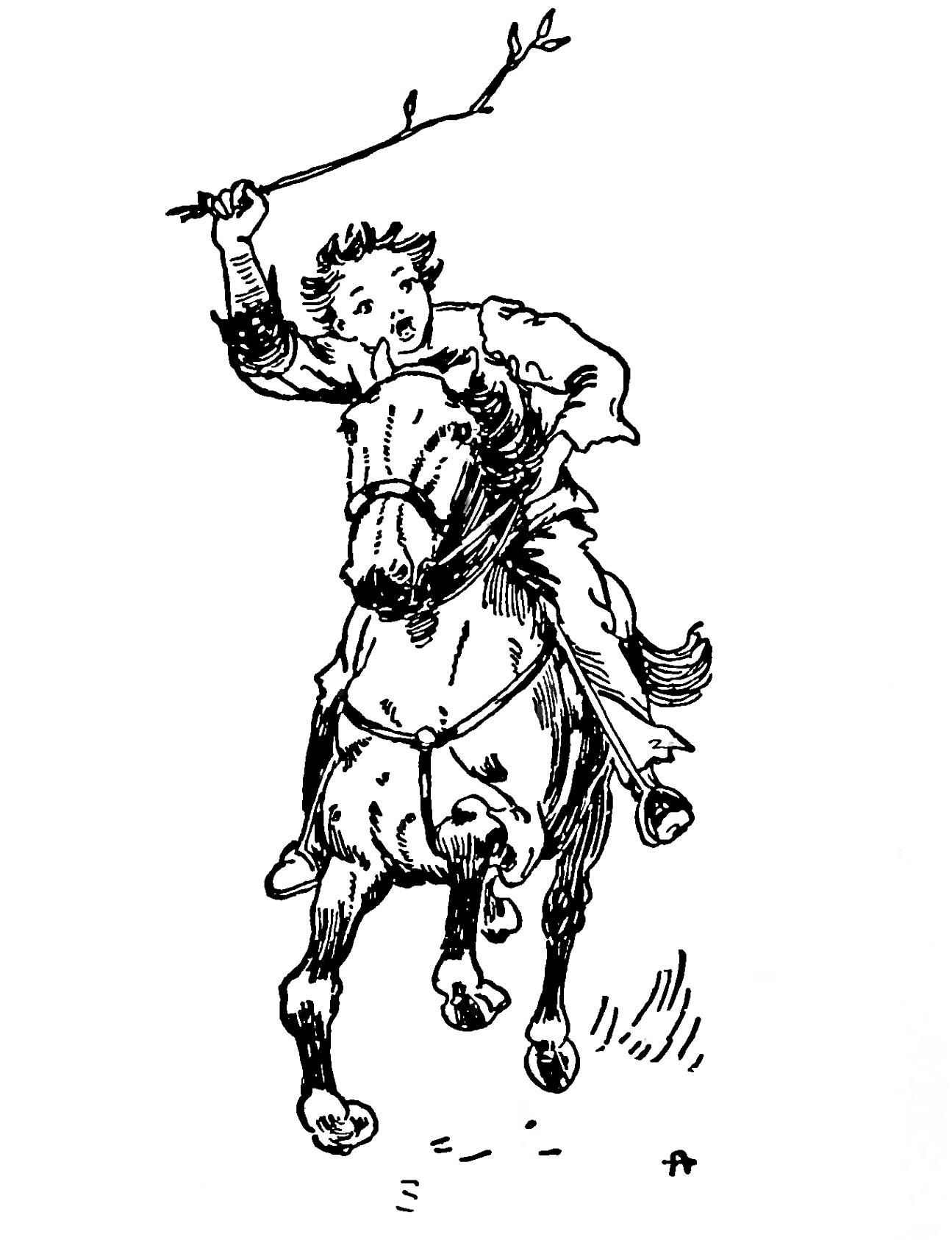

Nursery rhyme
- Published: 1605
- Songwriter: unknown

"If wishes were horses, beggars would ride" is a proverb and nursery rhyme, first recorded about 1628 in a collection of Scottish proverbs, which suggests if wishing could make things happen, then even the most destitute people would have everything they wanted. It has a Roud Folk Song Index number of 20004.

== Lyrics ==
Common newer versions include:

If wishes were horses, beggars would ride.
If turnips were watches, I'd wear one by my side.
If "ifs" and "ands" were pots and pans,
There'd be no work for tinkers' hands.

And also:

If wishes were horses, then beggars would ride.
If turnips were swords, I'd have one at my side.
If "ifs" and "ands" were pots and pans,
There'd be no work for tinkers' hands.

A shorter variant:

If wishes were horses, beggars would ride.
If turnips were bayonets, I'd wear one by my side.

A variant intended to be humorous:

If wishes were horses, then beggars would ride.
If horse turds were biscuits, they'd eat 'til they died.

== Origin ==
The first recognizable ancestor of the rhyme was recorded in William Camden's (1551–1623) Remaines of a Greater Worke, Concerning Britaine, printed in 1605, which contained the lines: "If wishes were thrushes beggars would eat birds". The reference to horses was first in James Carmichael's Proverbs in Scots printed in 1628, which included the lines: "And wishes were horses, pure [poor] men wald ride". The first mention of beggars is in John Ray's Collection of English Proverbs in 1670, in the form "If wishes would bide, beggars would ride". The first versions with close to today's wording was in James Kelly's Scottish Proverbs, Collected and Arranged in 1721, with the wording "If wishes were horses, beggars would ride". The rhyme above was probably the combination of two of many versions and was collected by James Orchard Halliwell in the 1840s.
