= Wetlands Preserve =

Former nightclub in New York City

Coordinates: 40°43′18.4″N 74°00′30.5″W

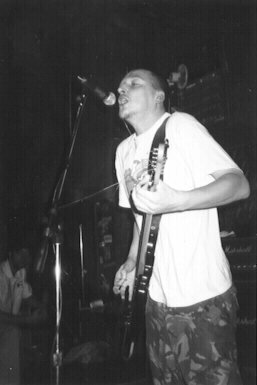
Justin Broadrick performing with Godflesh at Wetlands Preserve on November 11, 1996

Wetlands Preserve, commonly referred to as Wetlands, was a nightclub in New York City that opened in 1989 and closed in 2001. It was located at 161 Hudson Street in Manhattan's Tribeca neighborhood.

Wetlands has been called "ground zero for post-Grateful Dead jam bands", fostering a community of semi-improvisational rock bands who went on to achieve mainstream success in the 1990s.

== History ==
The original concept for the Wetlands Preserve came from founder-owner Larry Bloch, who set its course for over eight years before passing the helm to Peter Shapiro in 1997. Shapiro remained faithful to the mission until September 2001, when the gentrification of TriBeCa caused the building to be sold and the club was forced to close before being converted into condominiums. Acts that played at Wetlands include, Disco Biscuits, Blues Traveler, Spin Doctors, Phish, moe., Dave Matthews Band, Oasis, Ween, Maroon 5, Pearl Jam, Widespread Panic, The Tragically Hip, The String Cheese Incident, Joan Osborne, 311, Rage Against the Machine, The Wallflowers, Counting Crows, Gov't Mule, The Allman Brothers Band, Cypress Hill, The Roots, Robert Randolph and the Family Band, Jeff Buckley, Frank Black, At the Gates, R.L. Burnside with NMAS, Paul Kantner, Yonder Mountain String Band, Jorma Kaukonen, Paul Kelly and Sublime.

In addition to semi-improvisational rock, Wetlands hosted experimental hip-hop and neo-soul performers as well. The Roots built a loyal following in New York partially by driving up from Philadelphia for Wetlands' weekly open-mic nights. Neo-soul duo Jazzyfatnastees launched their weekly women's showcase "Black Lily" at Wetlands before moving it to The Five Spot in Philadelphia. Black Lily alumnae include Jill Scott, Macy Gray and Erykah Badu.

The Wetlands' independent, in-house booking strategies and the freedom to play all night nurtured a scene that helped bands develop a following. Late-night jams lasting until dawn were common. It was the intimate connection fostered between artist and audience, the continuity of a live DJ connection to the vibe of the night, and carefully balanced sound throughout the club, including the halls and bathrooms, that would bring the 7,500-square foot, two-level space to a pulsing unity that John Popper of Blues Traveler would lastingly nickname "Sweatglands". Supported by the music, Wetlands spent over one million dollars during its lifetime to fund the Activism Center at Wetlands Preserve, originally named the Eco-Saloon.

In July 2001, the venue announced its plans to close on September 15. However, Project Logic would end up being the final show on September 10, hours before planes hit the nearby World Trade Center. The club was able to reopen for one final jam session several weeks later. Zen Tricksters hold the record for most performances at the club.

On October 24, 2012, Larry Bloch died from pancreatic cancer at age 59. The Activism Center, now called Wetlands Activism Collective, continues to operate.

== Documentary film and book ==
Wetlands Preserved: The Story of an Activist Rock Club, a 90-minute documentary that commemorates Wetlands Preserve, was released in 2008. Produced and directed by Relix's Dean Budnick, the film gained accolades on the film festival circuit and then aired for several years on Sundance Channel.

In 2014, Wetlands NYC History: A Visual Encore, a book documenting the club's history and event lineup was compiled by Bloch's former wife, Laura Bloch Borque, and released via Frog2Prince publishing. The 248-page book features copies of each of the club's hand-drawn monthly event calendars.

== Live albums recorded at Wetlands ==
- Spin Doctors - Up for Grabs...Live (recorded 1990, released 1991), later repackaged in Homebelly Groove...Live
- Dave Matthews Band - Live Trax Vol. 20: Wetlands Preserve (recorded 1993, released 2011)
- Jeff Buckley - Live at Wetlands (recorded 1994, released 2019)
- Robert Randolph and the Family Band - Live at the Wetlands (recorded 2001, released 2002)
- Ulu - Live at the Wetlands Preserve NYC (recorded 11/19/99, released 2000)
- Soulfarm - Live at the Wetlands (recorded 3/20/2000, released 2000)
- moe. - Loaf (recorded 11/24/95 and 11/25/95, released 1996)
