= Spin Doctors =

American alternative rock band

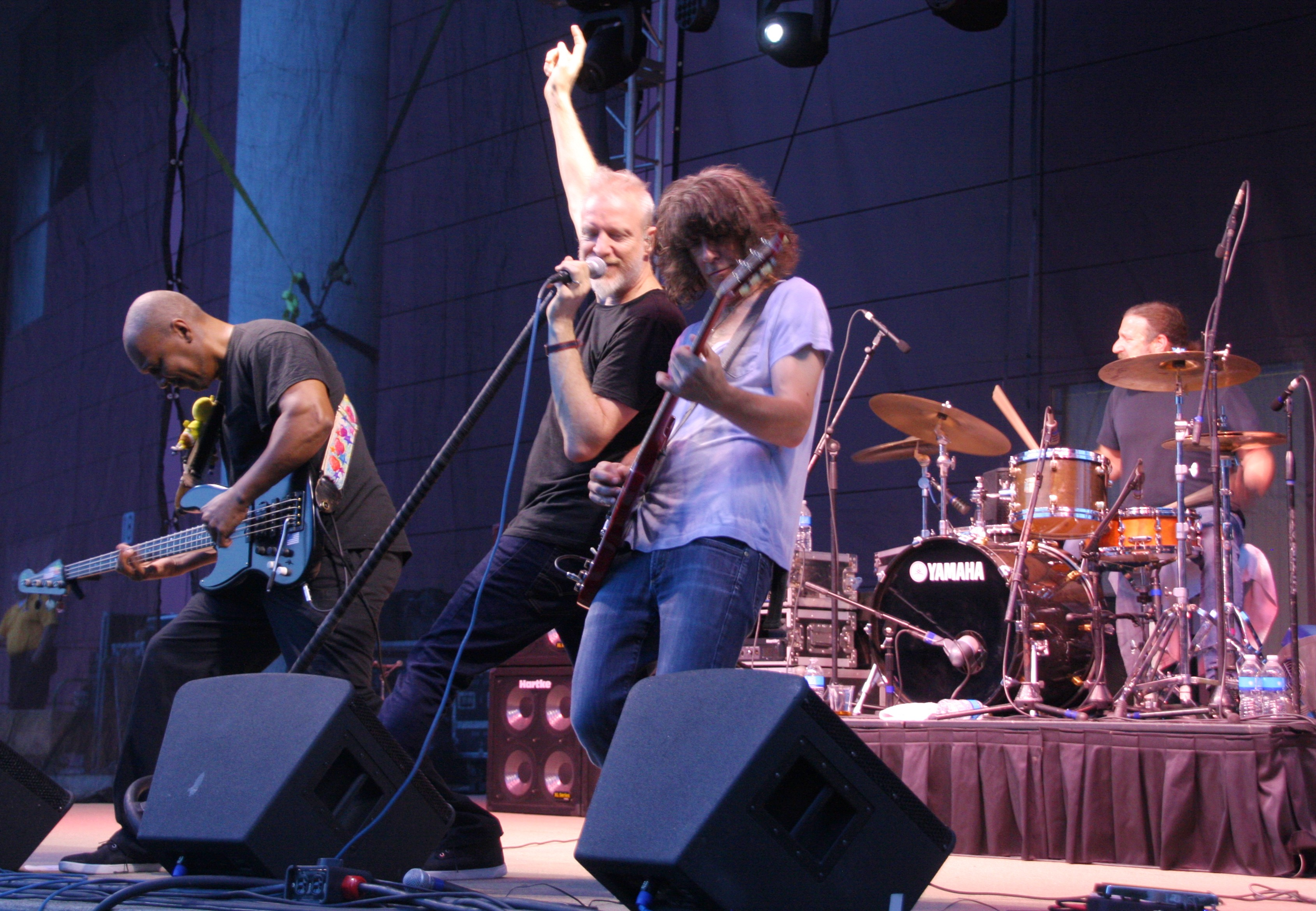
- Spin Doctors performing in 2017

Background information
- Also known as: The Trucking Company (until John Popper's departure)
- Origin: New York City, U.S.
- Genres: Alternative rock; funk rock; pop rock; jam band
- Years active: 1988–1999; 2001–present
- Labels: Epic; Uptown; Atlantic; Capitol
- Members: Chris Barron; Aaron Comess; Eric Schenkman; Jack Daley
- Past members: Mark White; John Popper; Anthony Krizan; Ivan Neville; Eran Tabib; Carl Carter; Brendan Hoolahan
- Website: spindoctors.com

Spin Doctors are an American alternative rock band from New York City, best known for their early 1990s hits "Two Princes" and "Little Miss Can't Be Wrong", which peaked on the Billboard Hot 100 chart at No. 7 and No. 17, respectively.

The band currently consists of Chris Barron (lead vocals), Eric Schenkman (guitar and vocals), Aaron Comess (drums and keyboards) and Jack Daley (bass).

== History ==
The group originated in the late 1980s in New York City, originally as a band called Trucking Company; this band included Canadian guitarist Eric Schenkman, harmonicist John Popper, and later vocalist Chris Barron, who was Popper's Princeton, New Jersey, high school friend. Popper left this side project to focus on his main gig with Blues Traveler full-time. With a name change to Spin Doctors, as well as the addition of Aaron Comess on drums and Mark White on bass, the classic lineup was in place by the spring of 1989.Barron’s brother Jeremy Gross served as guitar tech.

Spin Doctors signed with Epic Records/Sony Music A&R executive Frankie LaRocka in 1990. The band's Epic debut EP Up for Grabs...Live was recorded live at the Wetlands Preserve in lower Manhattan, and released in January 1991. (In November 1992, these EP tracks were remixed and supplemented by additional live recordings to form the album Homebelly Groove...Live.) Spin Doctors were known for their somewhat lengthy live shows, sometimes jamming even more than is evident on their live releases. They also often performed double-bill gigs opening for Blues Traveler, with members of both bands all jamming together as the transition from Spin Doctors set into the Blues Traveler set. Spin Doctors have many songs from their early club days that were never officially released, but remain circulated via concert recordings.

Spin Doctors's debut studio album, Pocket Full of Kryptonite, was released in August 1991. The band continued to play extensive live shows, gaining grassroots fans, as the album was mostly ignored commercially. In the summer of 1992, the band toured with the first lineup of the H.O.R.D.E. festival, sharing the stage with fellow jam bands Widespread Panic, Blues Traveler, and Phish. That summer, commercial popularity heated up, as radio and MTV began playing "Little Miss Can't Be Wrong" and "Two Princes", with the videos directed by filmmaker Rich Murray (who would direct many of the band's videos). The album went Gold in September 1992, and then received another boost in sales after the band's appearance on Saturday Night Live in October 1992. Additional videos and singles followed for "What Time Is It", "How Could You Want Him (When You Know You Could Have Me?)", and "Jimmy Olsen's Blues". By June 1993, the album went Triple Platinum. Ultimately it sold over five million copies in the U.S. and another five million overseas, peaking at No. 3 on the Billboard 200 albums chart.

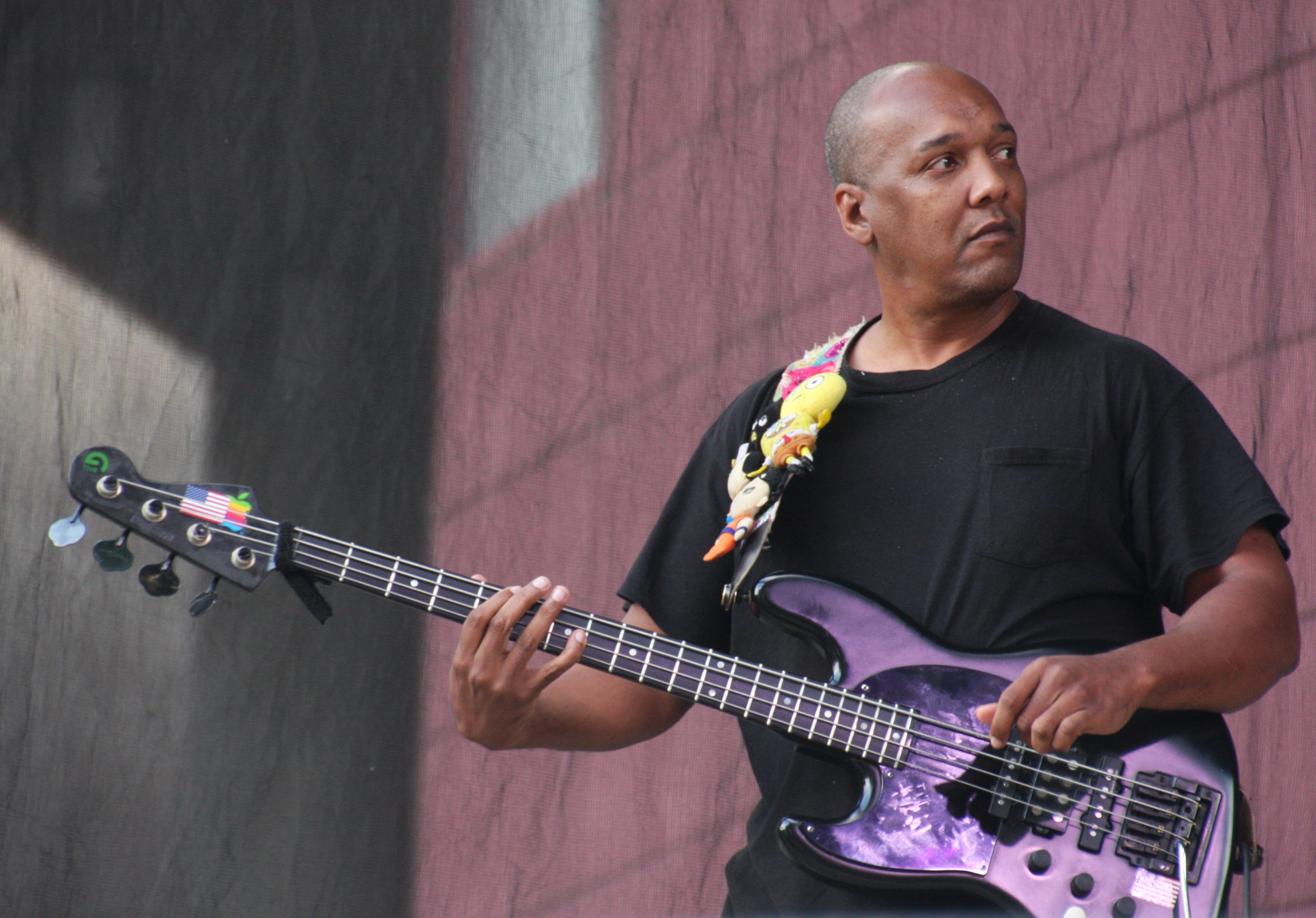
Mark White in 2017

Rolling Stone, which put the band on its cover in January 1993, said the band's "popularity is based on universal rock & roll virtues ... The Doctors aren't trying to blaze new trails. They know we've been down this way with the Stones, Curtis Mayfield, and a few of their other touchstones. But the proof—plenty of it—is in the party." Spin Doctors made an appearance on Sesame Street (episode 3450), singing a modified version of "Two Princes" that emphasized the importance of sharing starring Elmo, Zoe, and Telly. Another song on Sesame Street featured Muppet versions of their band starring Count von Count and Zoe singing "Little Miss Count Along" based on their hit "Little Miss Can't be Wrong" that focused on counting. In 1993, they recorded covers of "Have You Ever Seen the Rain?", originally by Creedence Clearwater Revival, for the film Philadelphia and "Spanish Castle Magic" for Stone Free: A Tribute to Jimi Hendrix.

Spin Doctors's second studio album, Turn It Upside Down, released in June 1994, was less commercially successful than Pocket Full of Kryptonite, but sold a million copies in the U.S. and another million internationally. The second single, "You Let Your Heart Go Too Fast", was a modest hit (No. 42 on the pop chart). The band set out on a three-month headlining tour, and played to large crowds at Woodstock '94 and the Glastonbury Festival. Shortly after the release of Turn It Upside Down, original guitarist Eric Schenkman left the band in September 1994 by walking offstage during a concert in Berkeley, California, citing musical and personal differences, and being weary of the road. Schenkman was replaced by Anthony Krizan.

Featuring new guitarist Krizan, Spin Doctors released You've Got to Believe in Something in May 1996. It produced the single and video "She Used to Be Mine". They performed on the Late Show with David Letterman and did some touring, with Ivan Neville joining the band on keyboards. During this period, Spin Doctors contributed the theme song to Seasons 2 and 3 of the television show Spin City. After touring wrapped up in the fall of 1996, Krizan eventually left the band, for reasons that remain relatively unknown. He was replaced by Israeli musician Eran Tabib after auditioning nearly 200 candidates. You've Got to Believe in Something did not live up to previous album sales, selling only 75,000 copies. Epic dropped the band in 1996.

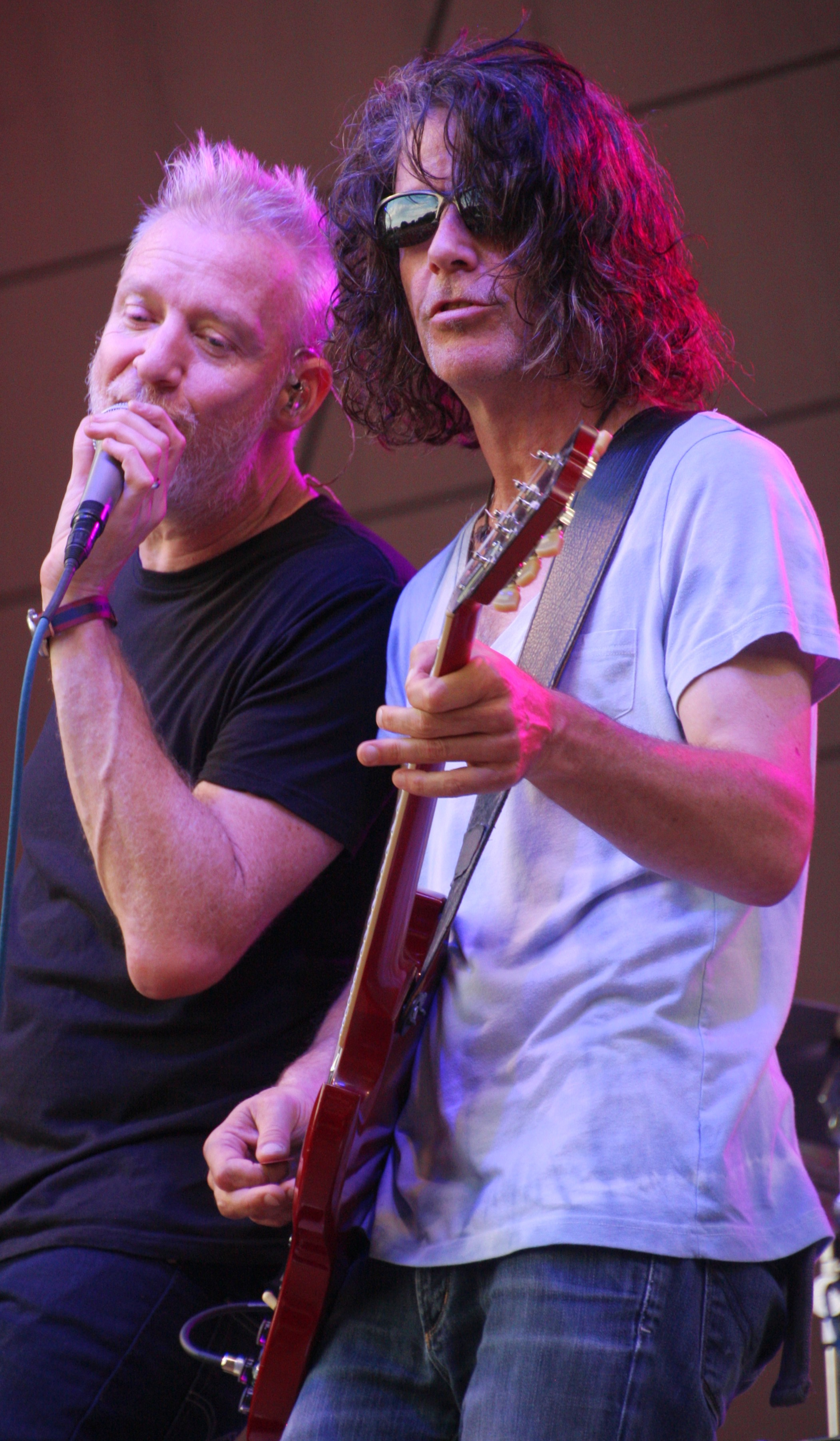
Barron singing with Schenkman playing guitar

In 1998, Spin Doctors signed to Uptown/Universal and released Here Comes the Bride in June 1999. During the recording of the album, Mark White left the band. The bass tracks on the album were finished by original band member Aaron Comess. During the tour supporting the album, Barron lost his voice due to a rare acute form of vocal cord paralysis that severely affected his ability to talk and sing. He was told he had a 50/50 chance of ever talking or singing normally again. Keyboardist Ivan Neville also took over vocal duties for a few dates, but the band eventually cancelled the remainder of its tour. Barron's voice came back in early 2000 (first comeback [solo] shows in March 2000), at which point he began performing with his band and the Give Daddy Five. Barron undertook what he calls "a journeyman songwriting experience", composing tunes with Blues Traveler's John Popper and with former BMI executive Jeff Cohen. Spin Doctors remained inactive as a band until September 2001, when news about the closing of Wetlands sparked the original four members to reunite. On September 7, 2001, the original lineup took the stage for the first time since 1994 to play at Wetlands. It was the final closing week of the club. The landmark show was a great success for the fans and the band.

Odd shows followed in 2002 through 2005, which eventually led to a brand new studio album, Nice Talking to Me, released on September 13, 2005. The single "Can't Kick the Habit" was included on the soundtrack to the movie Grandma's Boy. It received moderate radio airplay, along with the songs "Margarita" and the title track "Nice Talking to Me". While the record received good reviews, follow-up proved difficult when the record company that released it went out of business.

In 2008, the band continued to play one-off live shows in the United States and Europe. Drummer Aaron Comess released an instrumental record of all his own compositions entitled Catskills Cry featuring bassist Tony Levin and guitarist Bill Dillon. In 2009, Barron released the solo record Pancho and the Kid on Valley Entertainment. During the summer of 2010, Barron released Songs from the Summer of Sangria. This five-song EP was his first official release with his band The Time Bandits.

In 2011, the band celebrated the 20-year anniversary of Pocket Full of Kryptonite with a UK and US tour. Sony Legacy released a 20th anniversary edition with bonus material on August 29, 2011.

In April 2013, the band released If the River Was Whiskey, their sixth studio album.

In January 2022, the band fired longtime bassist Mark White after 33 years over his refusal to receive the COVID-19 vaccine.

On July 3, 2024, the band performed in Mason, Ohio for the Red, Rhythm, and Boom 4th of July celebration. The performance was delayed due to strong thunderstorms.

In August 2024, the band announced on their Facebook page that touring bassist Jack Daley has joined the band as a full-time member.

On January 16, 2025, the band released their first single in over a decade: "Still a Gorilla", and announced their next album, Face Full of Cake, would be released that April.

== Members ==
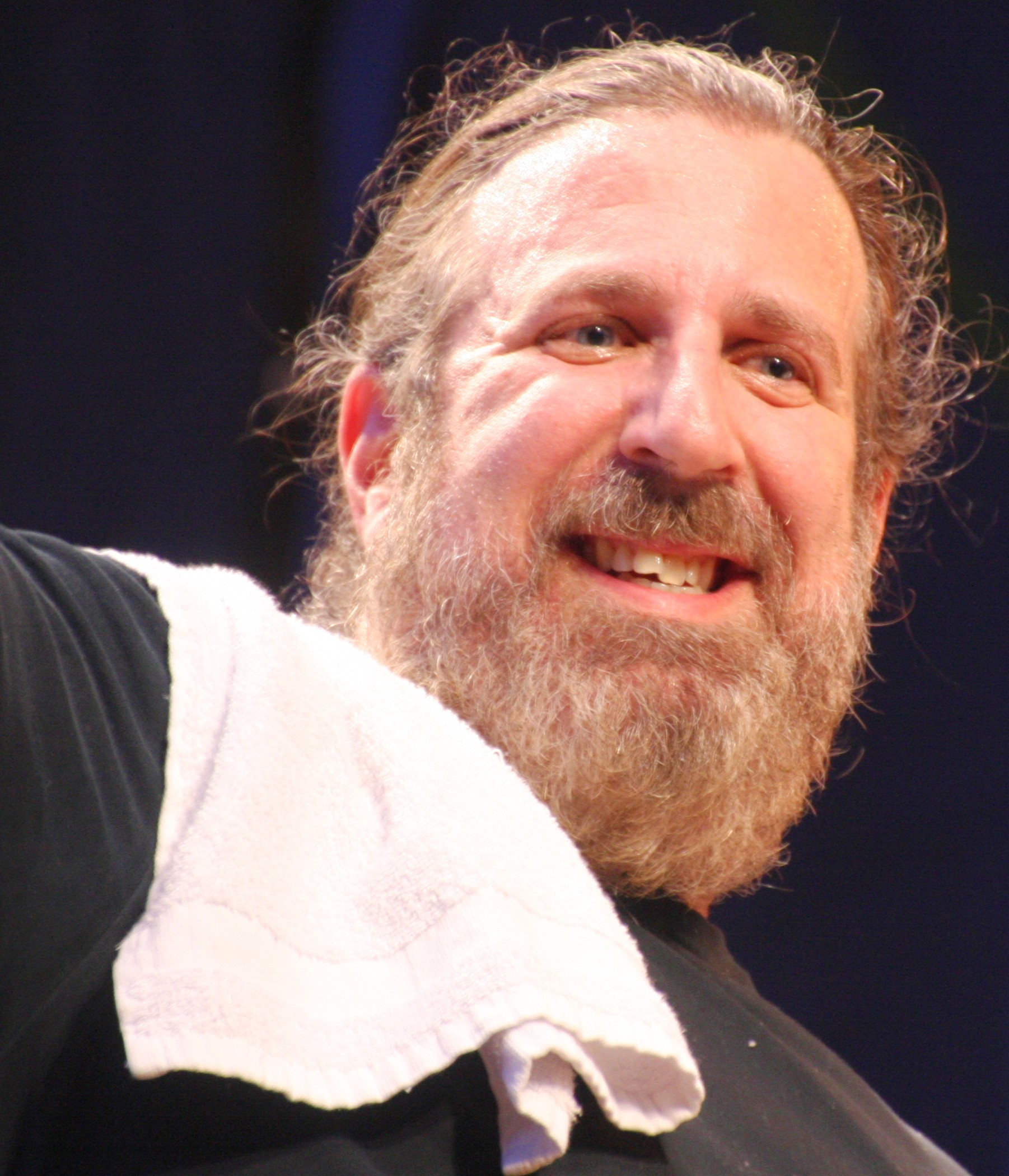
Aaron Comess in 2017

Current

- Chris Barron – lead and backing vocals, occasional acoustic guitar (1988–1999, 2001–present)
- Eric Schenkman – guitars, occasional lead and backing vocals (1988–1994, 2001–present)
- Aaron Comess – drums, keyboards (1988–1999, 2001–present), bass (1999, 2022)
- Jack Daley – bass (2024–present; touring 2021–2024)

Former

- Mark White – bass (1988–1998, 2001–2022)
- John Popper – harmonica (1988)
- Anthony Krizan – guitar, backing vocals (1994–1996)
- Ivan Neville – keyboards, backing vocals (1996–1999)
- Eran Tabib – guitar, backing vocals (1996–1999)
- Carl Carter – bass (1998–1999)
- Brendan Hoolahan – keyboards (2012–2013)

Touring

- Shawn Pelton – drums (2012)

Timeline

== Awards and nominations ==
American Music Awards of 1994

- Nominated for American Music Award for Favorite Pop/Rock Album for Pocket Full of Kryptonite

36th Grammy Awards

- Nominated for a Grammy Award for Best Rock Performance by a Duo or Group with Vocal for "Two Princes"

== Discography ==
- Pocket Full of Kryptonite (1991)
- Turn It Upside Down (1994)
- You've Got to Believe in Something (1996)
- Here Comes the Bride (1999)
- Nice Talking to Me (2005)
- If the River Was Whiskey (2013)
- Face Full of Cake (2025)
