= Two Princes =

1993 single by Spin Doctors

Single by Spin Doctors

from the album Pocket Full of Kryptonite
- B-side: "Off My Line" (live)
- Released: January 4, 1993
- Genre: Alternative rock; pop rock
- Length: 4:16 (album version); 3:26 (radio edit)
- Label: Epic Associated
- Songwriters: Mark White; Eric Schenkman; Chris Barron; Aaron Comess
- Producers: Frank Aversa; Mark White; Eric Schenkman; Chris Barron; Aaron Comess

Spin Doctors singles chronology
"Little Miss Can't Be Wrong" (1992)	"Two Princes" (1993)	"Jimmy Olsen's Blues" (1993)

Music video
- "Two Princes" on YouTube

"Two Princes" is a song by American rock group Spin Doctors. Epic Associated serviced the song to US radio in January 1993 as the second single from the group's debut album, Pocket Full of Kryptonite (1991). The song was a major commercial success, peaking at number seven on the US Billboard Hot 100 and number three on the Cash Box Top 100. Outside of the US, it topped the charts in Iceland and Sweden and peaked within the top 10 of the charts in 13 other countries, including Australia, France, Germany, Ireland, New Zealand, and the United Kingdom.

The song earned the band a Grammy Award nomination for Best Rock Performance by a Duo or Group. It was ranked No. 41 on VH1's "100 Greatest Songs of the '90s"; conversely, it was ranked No. 21 on Blender magazine's "50 Worst Songs Ever". Two different music videos were filmed for "Two Princes", with one of them in black-and-white. One of the videos was directed by Richard Murray and premiered in February 1992.

== Background and composition ==
Lead singer Chris Barron wrote "Two Princes" a few years before the Spin Doctors formed, though the band did not play it until they had been together for over a year. Barron said that he was inspired to write the song after seeing the vast inequality in the Princeton region of New Jersey, where he lived.

The lyrics describe two men, i.e. "princes", vying for a woman's affection. One suitor is wealthy, while the other is poor. The former is high-status and flashy (having "diamonds in his pockets" and wanting "to buy you rockets"), and marrying him is a choice the woman's family would readily approve of. The latter, represented by the singer, lacks a bourgeois background ("I ain't got no future or a family tree") and claims that the woman's father would disown her if she were to choose him. The protagonist sings "Oh, your majesty" towards the end of the song, suggesting that the woman is herself wealthy.

The song is known for opening with an iconic drum fill played by Aaron Comess. In a 2025 interview with MusicRadar, he said: "I honestly can't remember how my drum fill intro came to be. It just sort of developed and stuck. The stars aligned in the recording of that song. We recorded in the Power Station's A Room in NYC — the best drum room in the world."

== Critical reception ==
Stephen Thomas Erlewine from AllMusic named "Two Princes" one of the "best tracks" of the album. Larry Flick from Billboard magazine wrote, "The Doctors' growing legion of fans will devour this treat from Pocket Full of Kryptonite within seconds." He explained further, "Percolating rhythm section, courtesy of Aaron Comess and Mark White, propels Eric Schenkman's scratchy guitars and a pure-pop hook. Engaging vocals by Christopher Barron and lively instrumentation assure instant album-rock and alternative play, with visions of successfully crossing into the pop arena realistically dancing in everyone's heads." Randy Clark from Cash Box commented, "This crunchy rock/funk groove hints of the same raw, unpolished but infectious street quality of the early Rolling Stones except with an unspoiled and urgent alternative style." A reviewer from Kingston Informer complimented the song as "brilliant".

In his weekly UK chart commentary, James Masterton noted, "Leaping just as dramatically into the Top 10 come the Spin Doctors, almost 18 months after the track was first heard by the American public. It touches a chord with many as well. Marry him or marry me, I'm the one who loves you baby can't you see...." Ian Gittins from Melody Maker called it a "fairly catchy single", and "amiable and harmless and pleasant enough". Pan-European magazine Music & Media wrote, "Although the album [...] was released about two years ago, the singles of the medicals are still doing fine. Put your faith in this one too, as the funky guitar rock of this 'royal' track is as infectious as you could wish for." Roger Morton from NME praised it as "a freak wonder-song" with a "million-dollar hook." Leesa Daniels from Smash Hits gave "Two Princes" a full score of five out of five and named it Best New Single, saying, "This is their second bash at the UK charts and it's just marvellous. A thumping drum beat with guitars rocking all over the place, it makes you want to jump onto the nearest table and dance and twirl and swing your head around until you eventually, er, pass out!" Troy J. Augusto from Variety named it one of the group's "undeniable gems".

== Music video ==
The music video, directed by Richard Murray, portrays bassist Mark White trying to win the love of a diner waitress against a larger, more dominant man. Chris Barron expressed that he did not want to star as the main character as it is stereotypical, so they chose to have White play the role.

Originally, a cameo from rapper Biz Markie was planned for the music video, although after an hour without him showing up, the band instead had his bodyguard play in the video. Additionally, the band initially wanted to record part of the video in a bandshell, but the city turned them down, leading them to instead film at the Bethesda Fountain.

The hat that Barron wears in the video had been bought in a charity shop for $6, and the sweater he wears was given by their onset makeup artist.

== Track listing ==
- US cassette single
1. "Two Princes" (album version)
2. "Off My Line" (live)

== Charts ==
=== Weekly charts ===
Chart (1993)	Peak position
Australia (ARIA)	3
Austria (Ö3 Austria Top 40)	5
Belgium (Ultratop 50 Flanders)	10
Canada Top Singles (RPM)	2
Denmark (IFPI)	2
Europe (Eurochart Hot 100)	4
Europe (European Hit Radio)	6
Finland (Suomen virallinen lista)	13
France (SNEP)	5
France Airplay (Music & Media)	1
Germany (GfK)	3
Hungary Airplay (Music & Media)	11
Iceland (Íslenski Listinn Topp 40)	1
Ireland (IRMA)	5
Netherlands (Dutch Top 40)	2
Netherlands (Single Top 100)	3
New Zealand (Recorded Music NZ)	4
Norway (VG-lista)	2
Quebec (ADISQ)	6
Sweden (Sverigetopplistan)	1
Switzerland (Schweizer Hitparade)	4
UK Singles (Official Charts)	3
UK Airplay (Music Week)	2
US Billboard Hot 100	7
US Adult Contemporary (Billboard)	24
US Mainstream Rock Airplay (Billboard)	2
US Pop Airplay (Billboard)	1
US Cash Box Top 100	3

Chart (2019)	Peak position
Poland Airplay (ZPAV)	56

=== Year-end charts ===
Chart (1993)	Position
Australia (ARIA)	27
Belgium (Ultratop 50 Flanders)	21
Canada Top Singles (RPM)	16
Europe (European Hit Radio)	13
Germany (Media Control)	21
Iceland (Íslenski Listinn Topp 40)	13
Netherlands (Dutch Top 40)	19
Netherlands (Single Top 100)	31
New Zealand (RIANZ)	22
Sweden (Topplistan)	15
Switzerland (Schweizer Hitparade)	20
UK Singles (OCC)	25
UK Airplay (Music Week)	11
US Billboard Hot 100	28
US Album Rock Tracks (Billboard)	6
US Billboard Mainstream Top 40	1

== Certifications ==
Region	Certification	Certified units/sales
Australia (ARIA)	Platinum	70,000^{^}
Denmark (IFPI Danmark)	Gold	45,000^{‡}
Germany (BVMI)	Gold	250,000^{^}
Italy (FIMI)	Gold	25,000^{‡}
New Zealand (RMNZ)	2× Platinum	60,000^{‡}
Spain (Promusicae)	Gold	30,000^{‡}
United Kingdom (BPI)	Platinum	600,000^{‡}
^{^} Shipments figures based on certification alone.^{‡} Sales+streaming figures based on certification alone.

== Release history ==
Region	Date	Format(s)	Label(s)	Ref.
United States	January 4, 1993	Radio	Epic Associated	
Australia	March 21, 1993	CD; cassette	Epic Associated	
United Kingdom	May 3, 1993	7-inch vinyl; CD	Epic	

== See also ==
- List of Billboard Mainstream Top 40 number-one songs of the 1990s
- List of number-one singles and albums in Sweden
