= Frankie LaRocka =

American drummer

Frankie LaRocka (April 17, 1954 – May 12, 2005), born Frank LaRocca, was an American rock musician and producer. He was a member of Scandal, playing drums on their debut EP, and, at various stages, played the drums with Bon Jovi, David Johansen, Bryan Adams, and John Waite. In the 1990s, he became an A&R man and producer with his most notable work being with the Spin Doctors on their breakthrough album Pocket Full of Kryptonite.

== Musical history ==
LaRocka started his career playing drums with David Johansen on Johansen's self-titled album from 1978. He joined Scandal in 1982 and played on their self-titled album of the same year as well as earning credit on John Waite's Ignition album.

LaRocka toured with Bryan Adams on his 1983 world tour, and was part of the band when they appeared that year live in concert on the televised Rockpalast show (also broadcast live on European radio). Bon Jovi opened for Scandal in a 1984 tour which led to that band's signing by Polygram Records. La Rocka played drums on their 1984 Bon Jovi album. After parting company with Scandal, he returned to session work playing on sessions by John Waite and in 1985 appearing with him in his band on TV shows like Solid Gold. In the early '90s, LaRocka played drums with Company of Wolves, a straight-ahead rock band signed to Mercury Records.

LaRocka also signed a girl group from London called NeverBlue managed by Christopher Waller, Tasha Leaper, Lisa Hurley and Susan Motley. The group worked with Brian Rawlings, famed for Cher's Believe album. NeverBlue was signed to Straight Line Records under Atlantic Records.

LaRocka continued to work with NeverBlue after the group disbanded in 2000 and became a girl/boy duo with original member Susan Motley and new addition, Danny Willis.

== A&R and production work ==
LaRocka's first stab at production was with Irish band Silent Running, whom he signed while working in the A&R department at Atlantic Records. He also played drums on their album Deep. He began working for Sony Music and one of his first signings was the Spin Doctors. He produced their 1991 debut Pocketful of Kryptonite. The album sold slowly at first but it eventually became a hit after their song Little Miss Can't Be Wrong started picking up airplay on MTV and radio. The follow-up single Two Princes was a top ten hit and the album reached a peak of #3 on the Billboard charts in 1993. LaRocka produced subsequent albums for the Spin Doctors but they failed to achieve the same success.

LaRocka signed Columbus, Ohio, powerpop band Watershed to Epic Records in 1993. Under his supervision, the band recorded one live EP, Three Chords and a Cloud of Dust, and a Jim Steinman-produced album, Twister. Neither effort charted and Watershed was dropped from Epic in 1995.

By the end of his career at Sony, LaRocka was vice president of the A&R department. He was back playing drums for a New York band Hot Monkey Love and with Noel Redding on a 2002 live album recorded at Prague. He also had an independent production company, Straight Line Productions, and had signed the band happyendings to J Records where they were recording their debut record.

LaRocka died after undergoing heart surgery in New York in May 2005.
