= Little Miss Can't Be Wrong =

1992 single by Spin Doctors

Single by Spin Doctors

from the album Pocket Full of Kryptonite
- B-side: "What Time Is It?" (live); "Freeway of Plains" (live)
- Released: October 1992
- Genre: Alternative rock
- Length: 3:50
- Label: Epic
- Songwriter: Spin Doctors
- Producers: Peter Denenberg; Frankie LaRocka; Spin Doctors

Spin Doctors singles chronology
"Little Miss Can't Be Wrong" (1992)	"Two Princes" (1993)

Music video
- "Little Miss Can't Be Wrong" on YouTube

"Little Miss Can't Be Wrong" is a song by American rock group Spin Doctors, released in October 1992 by Epic Records as the lead single from their debut album, Pocket Full of Kryptonite (1991). The song reached number 17 on the US Billboard Hot 100 and number two on the Billboard Album Rock Tracks chart. It also reached number five in New Zealand and ended 1993 as the country's 41st-most-successful single. Live versions of "What Time Is It?" and "Freeway of the Plains" (mistakenly titled "Freeway of Plains" on the single) were included as its B-side.

== Background and writing ==
The lyrics describe the narrator's happiness about no longer associating with a demanding woman who never admits any faults. The opening lines are: "Been a whole lot easier since the bitch left town / Been a whole lot happier without that face around."

Lead singer Chris Barron has stated that the song was inspired by his relationship with his stepmother, despite popular belief that it was written about an ex-girlfriend. He described his stepmother as a "malignant narcissist". Barron had a viral tweet in August 2019 about the song's creation, writing: "My stepmom told me I'd be a janitor [nothing wrong with that] and live in the basement of a school and play guitar for the rats. I wrote a song about her. It's called Little Miss Can't Be Wrong. It's been played on the radio three million times."

== Critical reception ==
An editor from AllMusic retrospectively described the song as "incessantly catchy". Alan Jones from Music Week rated it three out of five, writing, "This driving, economical song — vaguely reminiscent in execution to some of Steve Miller's material — should win support of rock radio. It may not be a Top 20 hit, but should nibble at the lower end of the chart, and tee up their album A Pocket Full of Kryptonite." Sylvia Patterson from Smash Hits gave the song four out of five, viewing it as "feisty stuff."

== Music video ==
An accompanying music video for "Little Miss Can't Be Wrong" premiered in August 1992.

== Charts ==
=== Weekly charts ===
Chart (1992–1993)	Peak position
Australia (ARIA)	16
Belgium (Ultratop 50 Flanders)	26
Canada Top Singles (RPM)	47
Europe (Eurochart Hot 100)	65
Europe (European Hit Radio)	22
Germany (GfK)	32
Hungary Airplay (Music & Media)	7
Iceland (Íslenski Listinn Topp 40)	10
Ireland (IRMA)	27
Netherlands (Dutch Top 40)	27
Netherlands (Single Top 100)	28
New Zealand (Recorded Music NZ)	5
UK Singles (Official Charts)	23
UK Airplay (Music Week)	3
US Billboard Hot 100	17
US Mainstream Rock (Billboard)	2
US Pop Airplay (Billboard)	12

=== Year-end charts ===
Chart (1992)	Position
US Album Rock Tracks (Billboard)	10

Chart (1993)	Position
Iceland (Íslenski Listinn Topp 40)	70
New Zealand (RIANZ)	41
