= Chris Barron =

American singer, songwriter (born 1968)

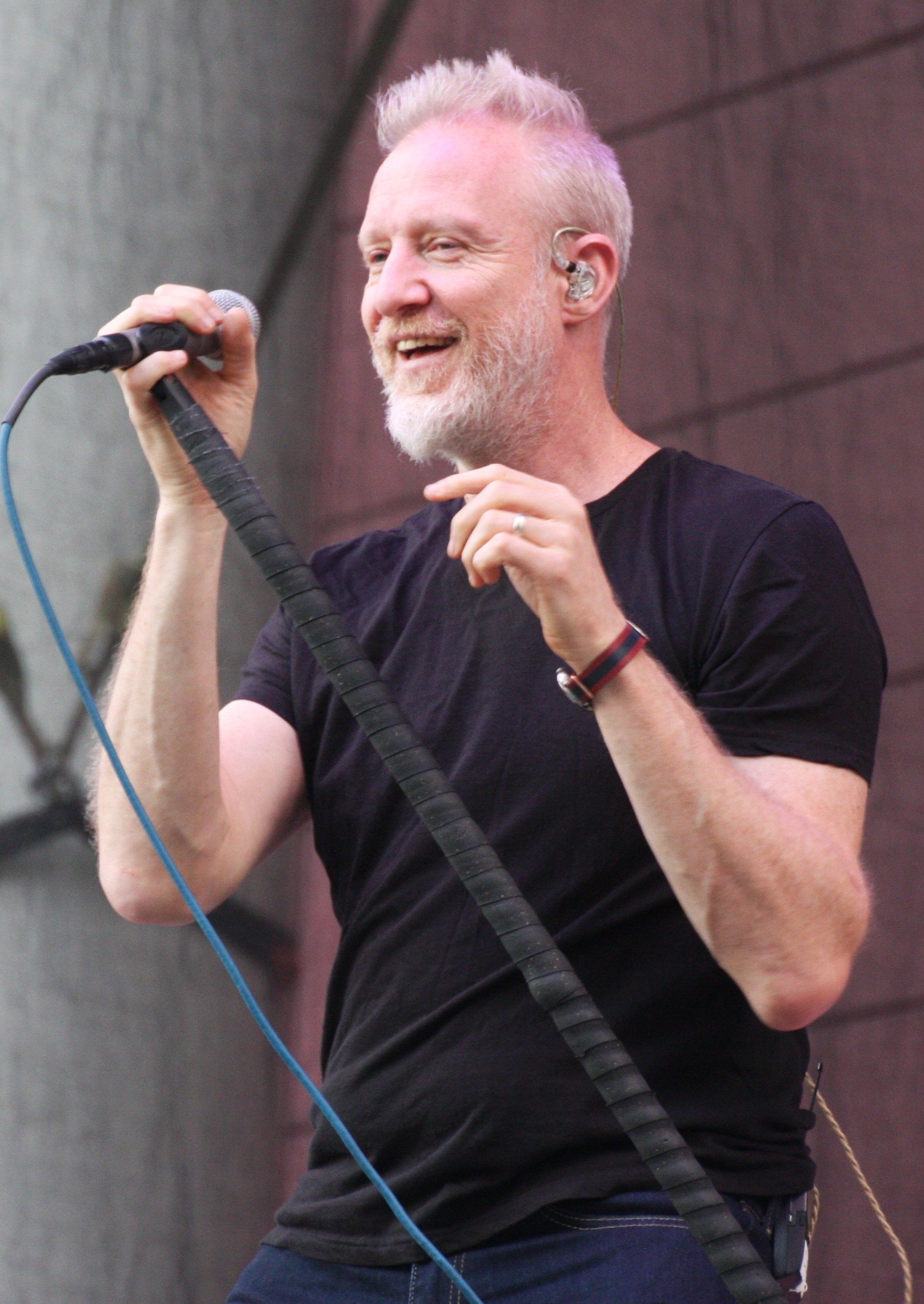
- Barron performing in 2017

Background information
- Born: Christopher Barron Gross; February 5, 1968 (age 58); Honolulu, Hawaii, U.S.
- Genres: Alternative rock; blues rock; jam rock
- Occupations: Musician; songwriter
- Instruments: Vocals; guitar
- Member of: Spin Doctors
- Spouse: Laura Benanti (m. 2005; div. 2006) Lindsay Nicole Chambers (m. 2012)

Christopher Barron Gross (born February 5, 1968), better known as Chris Barron, is an American singer and songwriter, best known as the lead singer of the Spin Doctors.

== Early life and education ==
Barron was born February 5, 1968, in Honolulu, where his father Ken Gross, an automotive journalist, was stationed during the Vietnam War. Barron had one brother, Jeremy (1970-2024), who was a guitar tech for the Spin Doctors. He has described his family as “this great big Jewish family”, with his ancestors coming from Russia. His uncle was Lennie Sogoloff, who owned the jazz club Lennie’s on the Turnpike in Peabody, Massachusetts. Barron spent his childhood in the Bronx and Rye, New York, and later moved to Australia for over three years when he was eight years old. As a child, Barron was interested in music and took guitar lessons. He studied music theory as an elective course in middle school.

When his family returned to the United States mainland, Barron attended Princeton High School in Princeton, New Jersey, the same school as John Popper, and the two became close friends. Barron and Popper would jam together after school. When he was 14, he worked at an ice cream shop.

He attended Bennington College in Vermont for one year. There, he was a member of two local bands: Dead Alcoholics With Boners and the Funbunnies. After leaving Bennington, Barron returned to Princeton, got a job at a restaurant, and immersed himself in music. During this time, he wrote "Jimmy Olsen's Blues" and "Two Princes".

== Career ==
One night, John Popper's band Blues Traveler was in town. After hanging out for a night and hearing Barron's songs, Popper invited Barron to move in with them in New York City, He joined the band Trucking Company with Popper and Canadian guitarist Eric Schenkman. Popper left this side project to focus on his main gig with Blues Traveler full-time. With a name change to Spin Doctors, as well as the addition of Aaron Comess and Mark White, the classic lineup was in place by the spring of 1989.

On May 17, 1999, just two weeks before the release of the band's album Here Comes the Bride, Barron woke up unable to talk. He lost his voice due to a rare acute form of vocal cord paralysis that severely affected his ability to talk, let alone sing. He was told he had a 50-50 chance of ever talking or singing normally again. Band keyboardist Ivan Neville took over vocal duties for a few dates, but the band eventually cancelled the remainder of its tour.

Barron's voice recovered by early 2000, and he performed a comeback show as a solo artist in March 2000 after which he returned to music with several side projects apart from Spin Doctors. Barron undertook what he calls "a journeyman songwriting experience," composing tunes with Blues Traveler's John Popper and with former BMI executive Jeff Cohen. A solo album called Shag was released in 1998, featuring diverse influences, including rock, jazz, country, and funk.

Spin Doctors remained inactive as a band until September 2001, when news about the closing of legendary NYC venue Wetlands sparked the original four members to reunite. On September 7, 2001, the original line-up took the stage for the first time since 1994 to play at Wetlands. It was the final closing week of the club. The landmark show was a great success for the fans and the band.

In 2009, he put out a solo album called Pancho and the Kid, and a year later he released an EP called Songs from the Summer of Sangria.

In 2012, Barron took part in the Norwegian selection for the Eurovision Song Contest, with The Canoes.

In 2017, Barron released Angels and One Armed Jugglers to positive reviews.

== Personal life ==
Barron met Laura Benanti in the early 2000s. They married on July 25, 2005, but by the end of the year were going through what Benanti has called a "terrible divorce." They were divorced in 2006. He then married actress Lindsay Nicole Chambers, the lead in the Broadway tour of Kinky Boots on February 14, 2012.

== Discography ==
- Shag – 1998
- "We're All New Yorkers Now" – 2001 (9/11 memorial CD single)
- Pancho and the Kid – 2006
- Songs from the Summer Sangria – 2010 (Chris Barron and the Time Bandits)
- Angels and One Armed Jugglers – 2017
