= Trapt discography =

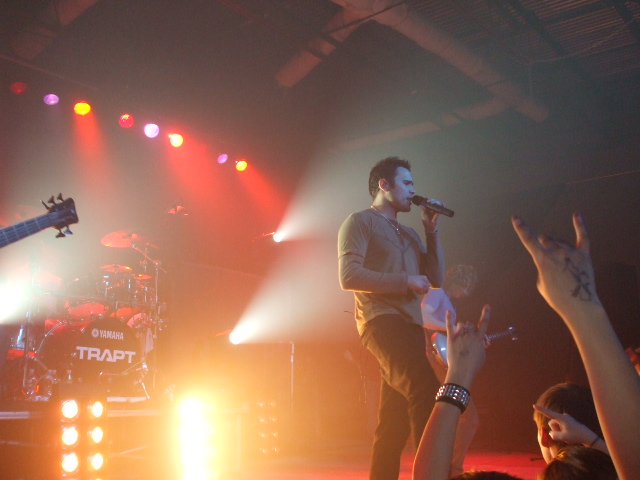
- Trapt vocalist Chris Taylor Brown live in Abilene, Texas
- Studio albums: 9
- EPs: 3
- Live albums: 1
- Compilation albums: 1
- Singles: 39
- Video albums: 1

The American rock band Trapt has released nine studio albums, one live album, three compilation albums, three extended plays and thirty-six singles. The band is also featured on the video album Crüe Fest. Trapt was formed in Los Gatos, California in August 1997, and is currently composed of lead singer Chris Taylor Brown, lead guitarist Shawn Sonnenschein, drummer Mitch Moore and bass guitarist Pete Charell.

== Albums ==
=== Studio albums ===
List of studio albums, with selected chart positions and certifications
Title	Album details	Peak chart positions				Sales	Certifications
Title	Album details	US	US Alt.	US Ind.	US Rock	Sales	Certifications
Trapt	Released: November 5, 2002; Label: Warner Bros.; Formats: CD, digital download	42	—	—	—	US: 1,500,000	RIAA: Platinum
Someone in Control	Released: September 13, 2005; Label: Warner Bros.; Formats: CD, digital download	14	—	—	—	US: 500,000	
Only Through the Pain	Released: August 5, 2008; Label: Eleven Seven; Formats: CD, digital download	18	4	2	4	US: 25,000	
No Apologies	Released: October 12, 2010; Label: Eleven Seven; Formats: CD, digital download	25	5	4	7	US: 71,000	
Reborn	Released: January 22, 2013; Label: Epochal Artists, EMI; Formats: CD, digital download	44	—	8	14	US: 8,700	
DNA	Released: August 19, 2016; Label: Crash Collide, The End, ADA; Formats: CD, digital download	148	11	10	15	US: 4,500	
Shadow Work	Released: July 3, 2020; Label: Crash Collide, New Legacy; Formats: CD, digital download	—	— (Note: Shadow Work didn't make it to the Top Alternative Albums chart, although its SoundScan data reported it at no. 22 on the Current Alternative Albums chart.)	—	—	US: 600	
The Fall	Released: May 31, 2024; Label: New Legacy; Formats: CD, vinyl, digital download	—	—	—	—		
Resurrection	Released: September 11, 2026; Label: Crash Collide; Formats: CD, vinyl, digital download	—	—	—	—	US: 1,200	

=== Demo albums ===
List of demo albums
Title	Album details
Amalgamation	Released: June 1999; Label: Self-released; Formats: CD

=== Live albums ===
List of live albums
Title	Album details
Trapt Live!	Released: September 18, 2007; Label: Eleven Seven; Formats: CD, digital download

=== Compilation albums ===
List of compilation albums
Title	Album details
Headstrong (Note: Reissued as "Greatest Hits" in 2012)	Released: October 25, 2011; Label: Cleopatra; Formats: CD, vinyl, digital download
Snapshot: Trapt	Released: 2013; Label: Eleven Seven; Formats: CD, digital download
The Acoustic Collection	Released: September 23, 2014; Label: The End, ADA, Crash Collide; Formats: CD, digital download; Note: Full band acoustic re-recordings

== Extended plays ==
List of extended plays
Title	EP details
Glimpse EP	Released: 2000, February 7, 2014 (re-release); Label: Self-released; Formats: CD, digital download (re-release)
Made of Glass (Live)	Released: September 30, 2003; Label: Warner Bros.; Formats: Digital download; Note: Same recordings as on Trapt EP
Trapt EP	Released: March 30, 2004; Label: Warner Bros.; Formats: CD
The Fall (Teaser)	Released: November 24, 2023; Label: New Legacy; Formats: Digital
The Fall (Teaser #2)	Released: May 3, 2024; Label: New Legacy; Formats: Digital

== Singles ==
List of singles, with selected chart positions and certifications, showing year released and album name
Title	Year	Peak chart positions									Certifications	Album
Title	Year	US	US Adult	US Alt.	US Hard Rock	US Main. Rock	US Pop	US Act. Rock	AUS	UK	Certifications	Album
"Headstrong"	2002	16	40	1	1	1	4	1	86	106	RIAA: Platinum; RMNZ: Platinum	Trapt
"Still Frame"	2003	69	—	3	—	1	—	1	—	—		Trapt
"Echo"	2004	— (Note: "Echo" did not enter the Billboard Hot 100, but peaked at number 25 on the Bubbling Under Hot 100 Singles chart, which acts as an extension to the Hot 100.)	—	10	—	13	27	12	—	—		Trapt
"Stand Up"	2005	— (Note: "Stand Up" did not enter the Billboard Hot 100, but peaked at number four on the Bubbling Under Hot 100 Singles chart, which acts as an extension to the Hot 100.)	—	17	—	3	—	3	—	—		Someone in Control
"Waiting"	2006	—	—	27	—	20	—	17	—	—		Someone in Control
"Disconnected (Out of Touch)"	2006	—	—	—	—	24	—	22	—	—		Someone in Control
"Stay Alive"	2007	—	—	—	—	—	—	—	—	—		Trapt Live!
"Who's Going Home With You Tonight?"	2008	—	—	31	—	11	—	11	—	—		Only Through the Pain
"Contagious"	2009	—	—	—	—	16	—	15	—	—		Only Through the Pain
"Sound Off"	2010	—	—	—	23	16	—	13	—	—		No Apologies
"Stranger in the Mirror"	2010	—	—	—	—	—	—	—	—	—		No Apologies
"Bring It"	2011	—	—	—	—	19	—	17	—	—		Reborn
"Love Hate Relationship"	2012	—	—	—	—	29	—	27	—	—		Reborn
"Passenger"	2015	—	—	—	—	24	—	—	—	—		DNA
"Human (Like the Rest of Us)"	2015	—	—	—	—	—	—	—	—	—		DNA
"It's Over"	2015	—	—	—	—	33	—	—	—	—		DNA
"Make It Out Alive"	2020	—	—	—	—	—	—	—	—	—		Shadow Work
"Tell Me How You Really Feel"	2020	—	—	—	—	—	—	—	—	—		Shadow Work
"Far Enough Away"	2020	—	—	—	—	—	—	—	—	—		Shadow Work
"Turn Me Around Again"	2021	—	—	—	—	—	—	—	—	—		Shadow Work
"Make It Out Alive" (Acoustic)	2021	—	—	—	—	—	—	—	—	—		Shadow Work
"Pride"	2021	—	—	—	—	—	—	—	—	—		The Fall
"Above It All"	2021	—	—	—	—	—	—	—	—	—		The Fall
"Drop Your Guard"	2021	—	—	—	—	—	—	—	—	—		The Fall
"Ignorance Is Bliss"	2023	—	—	—	—	—	—	—	—	—		The Fall
"Can't Look Away"	2023	—	—	—	—	—	—	—	—	—		The Fall
"Bulletproof"	2023	—	—	—	—	—	—	—	—	—		The Fall
"Stories (Electric)"	2023	—	—	—	—	—	—	—	—	—		The Fall
"My Devices"	2023	—	—	—	—	—	—	—	—	—		The Fall
"Try It First"	2023	—	—	—	—	—	—	—	—	—		The Fall
"Think of You"	2023	—	—	—	—	—	—	—	—	—		The Fall
"Safe Here In the Shade"	2024	—	—	—	—	—	—	—	—	—		The Fall
"Halo"	2024	—	—	—	—	—	—	—	—	—		The Fall
"Meant to Be"	2024	—	—	—	—	—	—	—	—	—		The Fall
"When I Get Better"	2024	—	—	—	—	—	—	—	—	—		The Fall
"Home"	2024	—	—	—	—	—	—	—	—	—		The Fall
"—" denotes a recording that did not chart or was not released in that territory.

=== Promotional singles ===
List of promotional singles, showing year released and album name
Title	Year	Album
"Promise"	2003	Non-album single
"Lost Realist"	2005	Someone in Control
"Alibi"	2005	Someone in Control
"Come Together" (featuring An0maly)	2021	Non-album singles
"Drown Me Out" (with Playboy the Beast)	2021	Non-album singles

== Videography ==
=== Video albums ===
List of video albums
Title	Album details
Crüe Fest (with Mötley Crüe, Buckcherry, Papa Roach and Sixx:A.M.)	Released: March 24, 2009; Label: Mötley, Eleven Seven; Formats: DVD; Note: Also available on CD

=== Music videos ===
List of music videos and directors
Title	Year	Director	Album
"Headstrong"	2002	Brian Scott Weber	Trapt
"Still Frame"	2002	Glenn Bennett	Trapt
"Echo"	2002	Meiert Avis	Trapt
"Stand Up"	2005	Dave Robertson	Someone in Control
"Stay Alive"	2007	Miles Kalbach	Trapt Live!
"Who's Going Home with You Tonight?"	2008	Paul Brown	Only Through the Pain
"Contagious"	2009		Only Through the Pain
"Sound Off"	2010	Todd Wiseman	No Apologies
"End of My Rope"	2010	Jason Corron	No Apologies
"Bring It"	2012	Six Finger Films	Reborn
"Love Hate Relationship"	2012	Six Finger Films	Reborn
"Experience"	2013	Six Finger Films	Reborn
"Living in the Eye of the Storm"	2013	Fernando Cordero and Vicente Cordero	Reborn
"Passenger"	2016		DNA
"Human (Like the Rest of Us)"	2016	Jay K. Raja	DNA
"It's Over"	2016	Vicente Cordero	DNA
"Come Together"	2018	Alisa Daglio	Non-album single
"Far Enough Away"	2020	Brad Owens	Shadow Work
"I Want to Want What I Want"	2020	Four by Three Productions	Shadow Work
"Fire"	2021		Shadow Work
"Ignorance Is Bliss"	2023	Matthew Nowak	The Fall
"Can't Look Away"	2023	Matthew Nowak	The Fall
"Bulletproof"	2023	Matthew Nowak	The Fall
"My Devices"	2023	Matthew Nowak	The Fall
"Try It First"	2023	Conklin Morgan	The Fall
"Think of You"	2023	Matthew Nowak	The Fall
"Safe Here in the Shade"	2024	Paul Alfonso Burch	The Fall
"Halo"	2024	Paul Alfonso Burch	The Fall
"Meant to Be"	2024	Matthew Nowak	The Fall
"When I Get Better"	2024	Paul Alfonso Burch	The Fall
"Home"	2024	Matthew Nowak	The Fall
