= The Acoustic Collection =

Compilation album by Trapt
- Released: September 23, 2014
- Recorded: 2014
- Studios: MT Studio, Burbank, CA
- Genre: Acoustic rock
- Length: 53:11
- Labels: Crash Collide; The End; ADA
- Producers: Chris Taylor Brown; Matt Thorne

Trapt chronology
Snapshot: Trapt (2013)	The Acoustic Collection (2014)	DNA (2016)

Singles from The Acoustic Collection
- 1. "Headstrong" Released: August 25, 2014

Professional ratings
Review scores
Source	Rating
Melodic	3/5 stars

The Acoustic Collection is an album by American rock band Trapt, released September 23, 2014, through their label Crash Collide Records, with distribution from The End Records and ADA. This album features acoustic re-recordings of Trapt's hits as well as fan favorites.

Best Buy offered an exclusive edition at release, containing autographed front covers by the band.

== Background ==
The Acoustic Collection was conceived during the band's writing sessions for DNA, as well as during their summer "Self-Titled Tour" in 2014. When interviewed by Loudwire, singer Chris Taylor Brown said of the album: "The Acoustic Collection really focuses on the songs we have written throughout the years. I think by stripping every song down to the basic instruments, it really allows the emotion in each song to be felt. We have played acoustic sets at radio stations, meet and greets with fans and have even done a few full acoustic shows and with each performance, our fans asked for an album of acoustic songs. I really feel like we delivered exactly what they had in mind."

== Track listing ==
No.	Title	Writer(s)	Original release	Length
1.	"Headstrong"	Chris Taylor Brown; Simon Ormandy; Pete Charell	Trapt (2002)	4:23
2.	"Echo"	Brown; Ormandy; Charell	Trapt	4:06
3.	"Only One in Color"	Brown; Ormandy; Charell; Robb Torres; Aaron Montgomery	Only Through the Pain (2008)	4:16
4.	"Contagious"	Brown; Ormandy; Charell; Torres; Montgomery; Dave Bassett	Only Through the Pain	4:19
5.	"These Walls"	Brown; Ormandy; Charell	Trapt	4:01
6.	"Ready When You Are"	Brown; Ormandy; Charell; Torres; Montgomery	Only Through the Pain	4:52
7.	"Black Rose"	Brown; Ormandy; Charell; Torres; Montgomery; Adam Malka	Only Through the Pain	5:02
8.	"Waiting"	Brown; Ormandy; Charell; Montgomery	Someone in Control (2005)	3:53
9.	"Lost Realist"	Brown; Ormandy; Charell; Montgomery	Someone in Control	3:57
10.	"Made of Glass"	Brown; Ormandy; Charell	Trapt	3:19
11.	"Too Close"	Brown; Malka; Russell W. Howard	Reborn (2013)	3:14
12.	"Who's Going Home with You Tonight?"	Brown; Ormandy; Charell; Torres; Montgomery	Only Through the Pain	3:24
13.	"Love Hate Relationship"	Brown	Reborn	4:21
Total length:				53:11

== Personnel ==
=== Trapt ===
- Chris Taylor Brown - vocals, guitar
- Travis Miguel - guitar
- Pete Charell - bass
- Dylan Howard - drums

=== Production ===
- Matt Thorne - producer, mixing, engineering
- Chris Taylor Brown - producer
- Pete Charell - additional engineering

== Charts ==
Chart (2014)	Peak position
US Independent Albums (Billboard)	45
US Top Current Album Sales (Billboard)	183
