= Enigma =

An enigma or riddle is something that is mysterious or puzzling.

Enigma may also refer to:

== Arts and entertainment ==
=== Film ===
- Enigma (1982 film), a film starring Martin Sheen and Sam Neill
- Enigma (2001 film), a film adapted from the Robert Harris novel
- Enigma (2009 film), a short film by the Shumway Brothers
- Enigma (2025 film), a documentary directed by Zackary Drucker

=== Literature ===
==== Comics and graphic novels ====
- Enigma (DC Comics), character
- Enigma (Marvel Comics), character
- Enigma (Vertigo), a title published by DC's imprint Vertigo
- Enigma Cipher, a series from Boom! Studios
- The Riddler, DC comics character whose full name abbreviates to E. Nigma
- Enigma (manga), 2010, published in Weekly Shōnen Jump

==== Other literature ====
- Enigma (novel), 1995, by Robert Harris
- Enigma (book), a 2008 children's book by Graeme Base
- Enigma, a novel in The Trigon Disunity series by Michael P. Kube-McDowell
- "Enigma" and "An Enigma", two poems by Edgar Allan Poe
- The Enigma, a monthly publication of the National Puzzlers' League
- Enigma, mathematical puzzles published in New Scientist 1979–2013

=== Music ===
==== Albums ====
- Enigma (Ill Niño album) (2008)
- Enigma, 2009 Jim Allchin album
- Enigma (Tak Matsumoto album) (2016)
- Enigma (Keith Murray album) (1996)
- Enigma (Aeon Zen album) (2013)

==== Songs ====
- "Enigma (Give a Bit of Mmh to Me)", 1978, by Amanda Lear
- "Enigma", 2007, by Amorphis from Silent Waters
- "Enigma", 2002, by Trapt from Trapt
- "Enigma", 2014, by Within the Ruins from Phenomena
  - "Enigma II", 2024, sequel track from Phenomena II
- "Enigma", 2020, by Lady Gaga from Chromatica

==== Other uses in music ====
- Enigma (German band), an electronic music project founded by Michael Cretu
- Enigma (British band), a 1980s band
- Enigma Records, an American rock and alternative record label in the 1980s
- Enigma Variations, 14 variations composed by Edward Elgar

=== Television ===
- Enigma (Derren Brown), a televised tour show
- Enigma (Canadian TV series), a Biography Channel TV series
- Enigma (Thai TV series), a television drama series
- "Enigma" (NCIS), an episode of NCIS
- "Enigma" (Stargate SG-1), an episode of Stargate SG-1
- Enigma, a character from Nip/Tuck

=== Video games ===
- Enigma (1998 video game)
- Enigma (2002 video game)
- Enigma, a 2000 video game, clone of XOR
- Enigma: Rising Tide, a 2003 video game
- Enigma, a character from Dota 2
- Enigma, a character from Jet Moto 2
- "The Enigma", an episode of the video game Batman: The Enemy Within

=== Other uses in arts and entertainment ===
- The Enigma (Doré), a 1871 painting by Gustave Doré
- The Enigma (performer), American
- Enigma (roller coaster), Pleasurewood Hills, Suffolk, England

== Places ==
- Enigma, Georgia
- Enigma, Tennessee
- Enigma Peak, a mountain in Palmer Land, Antarctica
- Copenhagen Post & Tele Museum (Enigma - Museum for Post, Tele og Kommunikation), the national Danish postal museum

== Science and technology ==
- ENIGMA, a class of gene in the LIM domain
- Enigma (company), a New York–based data-technology startup
- Enigma machine, a family of German electro-mechanical encryption machines
- Red Hat Linux 7.2 (codename "Enigma")
- Enigma (DVB), the second generation of Enigma software

== Transport ==
- Enigma (yacht), a private superyacht
- Enigma Motorsport, a British motor-racing team

== Other uses ==
- The Enigma (diamond), the world's largest cut diamond
- Copenhagen Post & Tele Museum (Enigma - Museum for Post, Tele og Kommunikation), the national Danish postal museum

== See also ==
- Ænigma (disambiguation)
- Enigmata (disambiguation)
- Enigmatic (disambiguation)
- Lady Gaga Enigma, a concert residency
- Publius Enigma, an unsolved Internet puzzle
- 23 enigma, a belief in the significance of number 23
