= Aphodiites =

Aphodiites Temporal range: Lower Jurassic

Scientific classification
- Kingdom: Animalia
- Phylum: Arthropoda
- Clade: Pancrustacea
- Class: Insecta
- Order: Coleoptera
- Suborder: Polyphaga
- Infraorder: Scarabaeiformia
- Superfamily: Scarabaeoidea
- Genus: †Aphodiites; Heer, 1865
- Species: †A. protogaeus

Binomial name
- †Aphodiites protogaeus Heer, 1865

Extinct genus of beetles

Aphodiites is a genus of fossil beetles from the Lias (Lower Jurassic) of Schambelen (Aargau, Switzerland), and the oldest fossil in the superfamily Scarabaeoidea. Its affinities are not apparent; it was initially placed in the Aphodiinae (Scarabaeidae), but its diagnostic characters are shared by beetles such as Glaresis (Glaresidae).
