= Michelle Trachtenberg =

American actress (1985–2025)

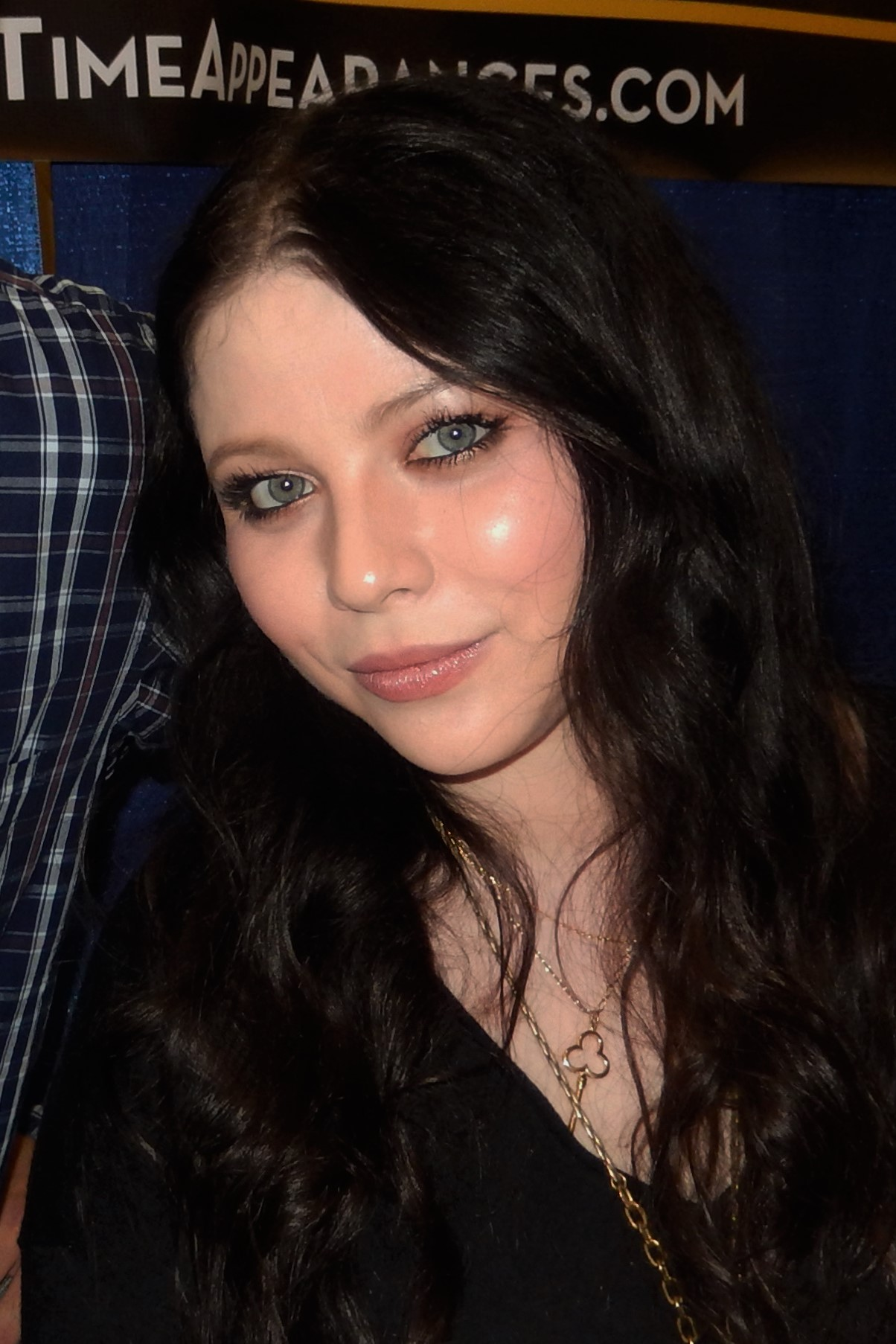
- Trachtenberg in 2018
- Born: Michelle Christine Trachtenberg; October 11, 1985; New York City, U.S.
- Died: February 26, 2025 (aged 39); New York City, U.S.
- Occupation: Actress
- Years active: 1988–2025
- Partner: Jay Cohen (2020–2025)

Michelle Christine Trachtenberg (October 11, 1985 – February 26, 2025) was an American actress. After beginning her career in commercials at age three, she made her television debut in her first credited role on the Nickelodeon series The Adventures of Pete & Pete (1994–1996) and her feature film debut in the 1996 comedy Harriet the Spy. As a child actress, Trachtenberg starred in several Nickelodeon productions. In 1997, she won a Young Artist Award for her performance in CBS' sitcom Meego. She also played Penny Brown in Disney's 1999 superhero comedy film Inspector Gadget.

Trachtenberg found success on the supernatural drama series Buffy the Vampire Slayer (2000–2003) as Dawn Summers, the younger sister of Buffy, for which she won another Young Artist Award and earned her three Saturn Award nominations. She was also nominated for a Daytime Emmy Award for her role as the host of the Discovery Kids series Truth or Scare (2001–2003). In her late teens and early 20s, Trachtenberg rose to further prominence in the film EuroTrip (2004) and as Georgina Sparks on the CW series Gossip Girl (2008–2012). During the mid-2000s, she also had a starring role in the film Ice Princess (2005) and supporting roles in the films Mysterious Skin (2004) and Black Christmas (2006). She also starred in the film 17 Again (2009) and on the NBC series Mercy (2009–2010).

In the 2010s, Trachtenberg was in several television films, including Killing Kennedy (2013) and Sister Cities (2015), and in the science fiction film The Scribbler (2014). She provided the lead voice of Judy in Facebook Watch's adult animated web series Human Kind Of (2018) and executive produced the teen drama web series Guidance (2015–2017) and Tubi's true crime series Meet, Marry, Murder (2021).

== Early life and education ==
Michelle Christine Trachtenberg was born on October 11, 1985, in New York City to Lana, a bank manager, and Michael Trachtenberg, a fiber-optics manager. Her parents were Jewish immigrants; her father was from Germany and her mother was from Ukraine. Her mother, who spoke Russian, helped her learn some Russian for a role in 2013. In an interview in November 2013, Trachtenberg said that her father had died recently. She had an older sister named Irene.

Trachtenberg was raised in Sheepshead Bay, Brooklyn, where she attended junior high school at The Bay Academy for the Arts and Sciences. Her family later moved to Los Angeles, where she attended Notre Dame High School in Sherman Oaks. She said in a later interview and on social media that she was bullied in school. She was a youth representative for the launch of an anti-drug campaign with President Bill Clinton.

== Career ==
=== 1988–2005: Career beginnings and Buffy the Vampire Slayer ===
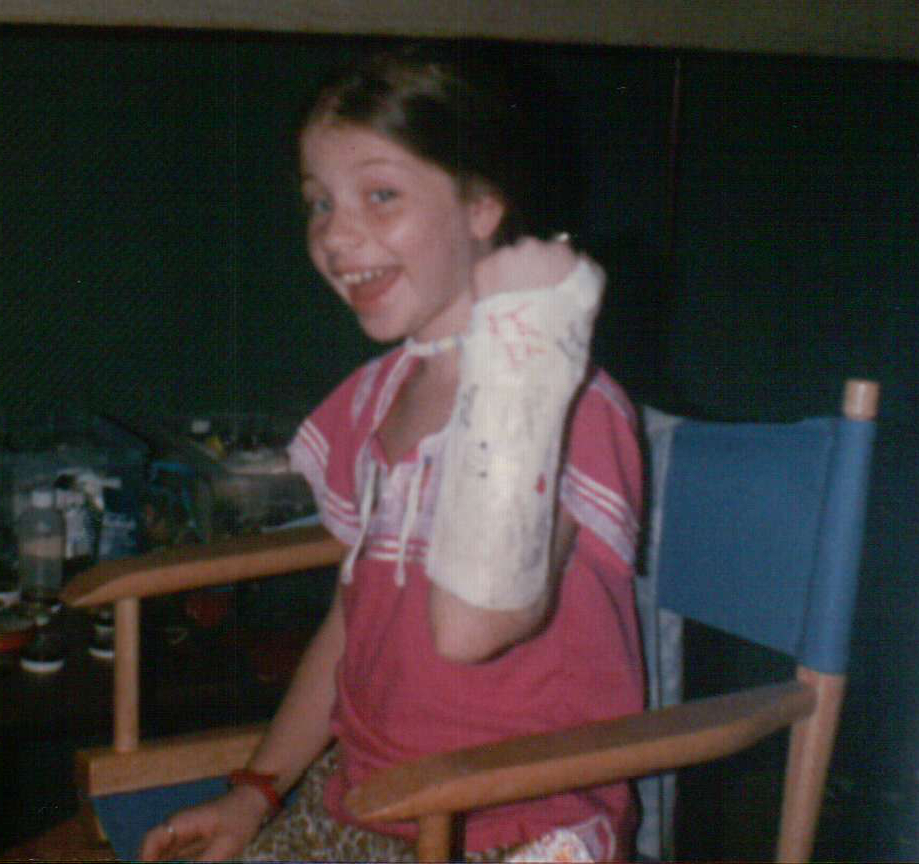
Trachtenberg on the set of The Adventures of Pete & Pete (1995)

Trachtenberg made her first television appearance at age three in a commercial for Wisk detergent. She would eventually play featured roles in more than 100 commercials. She made her television debut in an episode of the crime drama Law & Order, before gaining recognition on the Nickelodeon series The Adventures of Pete & Pete as Nona F. Mecklenberg. During the same period, she played Lily Montgomery on the soap opera All My Children.

Trachtenberg's film career began in 1996 with the title role in Harriet the Spy, for which she had to leave The Adventures of Pete & Pete while its third season was running. She then starred in the short-lived television series Meego, which garnered her a Young Artist Award. She returned to film in 1999 for Inspector Gadget. She also starred in the film Can't Be Heaven. In 2000, she began playing Dawn Summers, the younger sister of the title character (played by Sarah Michelle Gellar) in Buffy the Vampire Slayer. She also hosted the Discovery Kids series Truth or Scare from 2001 to 2003, for which she was nominated for a Daytime Emmy Award.

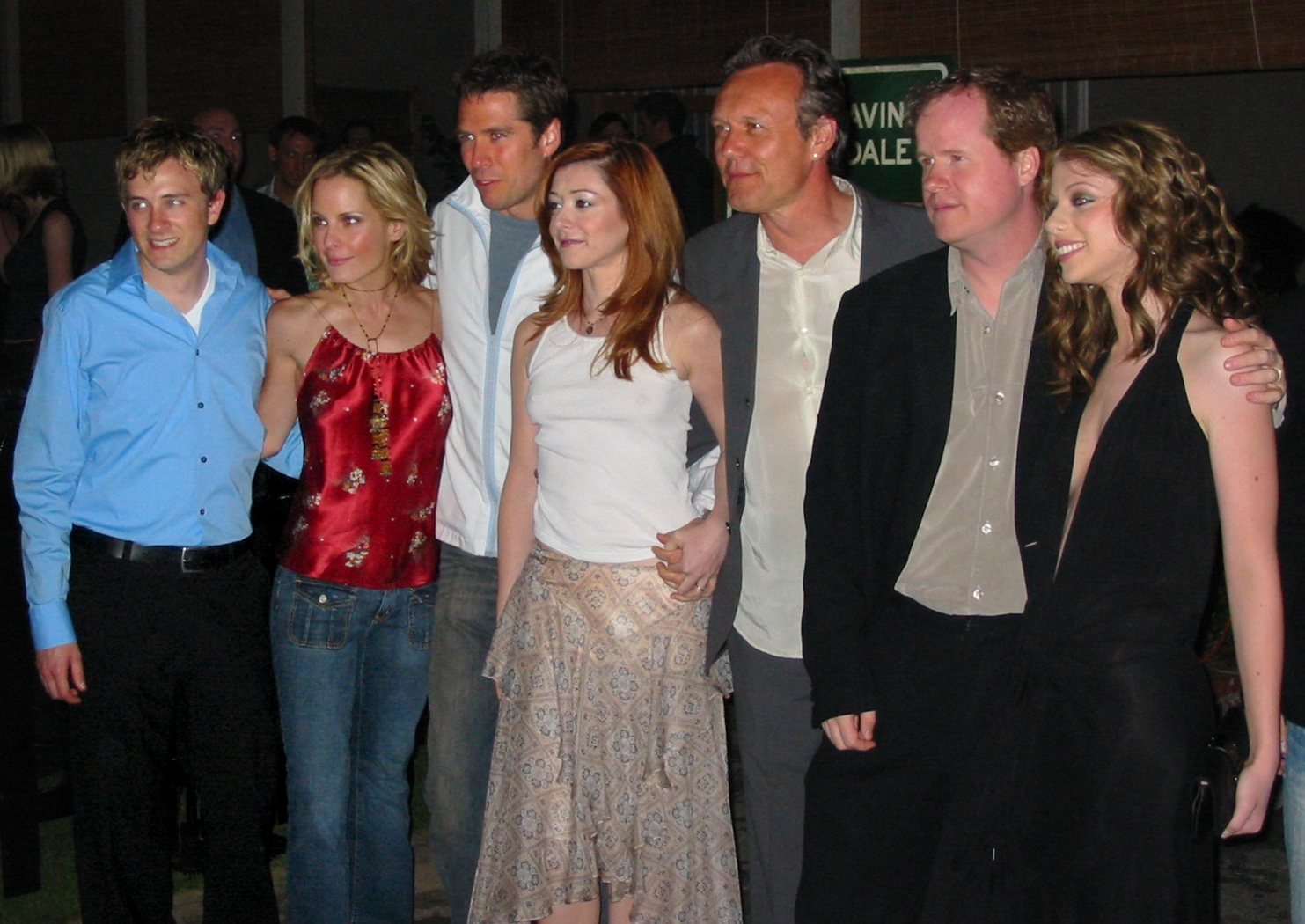
Trachtenberg (far right) with some cast members of Buffy the Vampire Slayer in 2003

In 2004, after Buffy and Truth or Scare, Trachtenberg appeared in the music video for the Trapt song "Echo" and as Jenny in the teen comedy film EuroTrip. That same year, Trachtenberg played Wendy in Mysterious Skin, Gregg Araki's film adaptation of Scott Heim's novel. Wendy is the best friend of Neil (Joseph Gordon Levitt), a teenage hustler in small-town Kansas. The film debuted at the 2004 Venice Film Festival. She also had a recurring role in the HBO series Six Feet Under, as Celeste, a spoiled pop star.

In March 2005, Trachtenberg starred in Walt Disney Pictures' comedy sports drama film Ice Princess as Casey Carlyle, a science whiz, who is torn between a future in academia and her newfound dream of being a competitive figure skater.

=== 2006–2010: Gossip Girl and other work ===
In April 2006, Trachtenberg guest-starred an the episode of House, "Safe". She revealed on the December 22, 2006, episode of Late Night with Conan O'Brien that House was her favorite show, and that she was friends with one of the producers and had asked to be a guest star.

In November 2006, Trachtenberg guest starred in season six of the crime drama Law & Order: Criminal Intent. In the episode "Weeping Willow", she played the role of Willow, a kidnapped video blogger, likely based on lonelygirl15.

In 2006, Trachtenberg starred in Black Christmas, the remake of the 1974 slasher. In 2007, she was cast as the female lead in an ABC comedy pilot called The Hill, based on the newspaper of the same name in Washington, D.C.

In 2008, Trachtenberg provided the voice of Tika Waylan for Dragonlance: Dragons of Autumn Twilight, a direct-to-video animated film based on the novel of the same name. She appeared on The CW hit show Gossip Girl, as Georgina Sparks, who recently left rehab and brings back the dark past Serena van der Woodsen desperately wants to leave behind. She returned to the show for a multiple-episode story arc towards the end of season two. Trachtenberg appeared in the season three finale and in season four. She also appeared several times in season five, and in almost every episode of season six, the show's final season. In 2009, Trachtenberg was a cast member on the NBC drama series Mercy, which lasted one season. She then returned to film, starring in the 2009 teen fantasy comedy 17 Again and had a small role in the comedy Cop Out (2010).

=== 2011–2024: Later work and final projects ===
On June 9, 2011, Trachtenberg guest-starred on Love Bites, as Jodie, who, after being unceremoniously dumped, decides—with a vengeance—to accept her ex's offer to "be friends". She reprised the role on June 16, 2011, and in the series finale on July 21, 2011. In the same year, Trachtenberg was a guest star on Weeds during its seventh season, portraying Emma, a rival pot dealer who causes problems for Silas Botwin. In June 2012, Trachtenberg was cast in the film The Scribbler, produced by Gabriel Cowan.

In March 2011, she was the featured cover girl in Maxim. In the Criminal Minds episode "Zugzwang", Trachtenberg played Diane Turner, the criminal stalker of Spencer Reid's girlfriend, Maeve Donovan.

In late 2015, Trachtenberg starred in the online series Guidance as Anna, the high school guidance counselor. In 2016, she said she was a member of the Writers Guild of America and that she was working on several writing projects and continued to be inspired by her role in Harriet the Spy. According to filmmaker Casey Tebo, she had written a screenplay based on the book Toy Monster.

In 2022, Trachtenberg reprised her role as Georgina Sparks in the second season of the HBO revival of Gossip Girl. In 2023, she had a voice role in Apple TV+'s animated series adaptation of Harriet the Spy. In 2024, Trachtenberg made her final film appearance as a narrator for the documentary Spyral, which focuses on people struggling with mental illness. Trachtenberg planned to make an appearance at the South by Southwest (SXSW) festival in Austin, Texas.

== Personal life ==
In her earlier years, Trachtenberg dated actor Shawn Ashmore from 2004 to 2006, and had a brief relationship with musician Pete Wentz in 2006.

At the time of her death, she was in a long-term relationship with talent agent Jay Cohen. The couple began dating in 2020 and preferred to keep their private life out of the public eye.

== Illness and death ==
In early 2024, Trachtenberg addressed concerns on social media regarding her health after some people commented on her apparent weight loss and signs of jaundice. She reassured her followers that she was "happy and healthy." Trachtenberg underwent a liver transplant sometime later that year. Trachtenberg's Harriet the Spy co-star Rosie O'Donnell claimed she struggled with drug and alcohol abuse during her final years, although Trachtenberg herself had previously denied any substance use to protect her career and public image.

On February 26, 2025, Trachtenberg was found unresponsive at her New York apartment by her mother. Emergency medical services were called and she was pronounced dead at the scene. According to the New York City Police Department, foul play was not suspected in her death. A source later reported to People that Trachtenberg talked about her health problems with those close to her during the last year of her life.

After Trachtenberg's family objected to an autopsy for religious reasons, the Office of Chief Medical Examiner of the City of New York announced that the cause and manner of death were undetermined at the time. One month later, the office's toxicology results declared Trachtenberg's primary cause of death as complications of diabetes which is sometimes a side effect of liver transplantation.

=== Tributes ===
Numerous celebrities, including Trachtenberg's Buffy the Vampire Slayer and Gossip Girl co-stars, paid tribute to her. Rosie O'Donnell said, "I loved her very much. She struggled the last few years. I wish I could have helped." Rock band Trapt paid tribute, saying, "...easy to see how many you touched," referring to her performance in their 2004 music video for "Echo." On the first anniversary of her death, Sarah Michelle Gellar memorialized her by saying, "I'm one of the lucky ones who has over 30 years of memories with you. You may not have been with us long enough, but we will make sure everyone remembers.”

== Filmography ==
=== Film ===
Year	Title	Role	Notes	Ref.
1995	Melissa	Lena	Uncredited	
1996	Harriet the Spy	Harriet M. Welsch		
1998	Richie Rich's Christmas Wish	Gloria Glad	Direct-to-video	
1999	Inspector Gadget	Penny Brown		
1999	Can't Be Heaven	Julie		
2004	EuroTrip	Jenny		
2004	Mysterious Skin	Wendy Peterson		
2005	Ice Princess	Casey Carlyle		
2006	Beautiful Ohio	Sandra		
2006	Black Christmas	Melissa Kitt		
2008	Dragonlance: Dragons of Autumn Twilight	Tika Waylan	Voice; direct-to-video	
2009	Against the Current	Suzanne		
2009	17 Again	Maggie O'Donnell		
2010	Cop Out	Ava Monroe		
2010	DC Showcase: Jonah Hex	Bar Girl	Voice; short film	
2011	Take Me Home Tonight	Ashley		
2013	Sexy Evil Genius	Miranda Prague	Direct-to-video	
2014	The Scribbler	Alice / Veronica		
2024	Spyral	Michelle Cody White	Voice; documentary (final role)	

=== Television ===
Year	Title	Role	Notes	Ref.
1991	Law & Order	Dinah Driscoll	Episode: "God Bless the Child"; uncredited	
1993	Clarissa Explains It All	Elsie Soaperstein	Episode: "Babysitting"	
1994	All My Children	Lily Benton Montgomery	3 episodes	
1994–1996	The Adventures of Pete & Pete	Nona F. Mecklenberg	14 episodes; recurring role (seasons 2–3)	
1996	Dave's World	Angela	Episode: "Solitaire"	
1996	Space Cases	Prankster #1	Episode: "All You Can Eaty"	
1996	A Holiday for Love	Noelle Murphy	Television film	
1997	Meego	Maggie Parker	13 episodes; main role	
1998	Blue's Clues	Herself	Episode: "Blue's Birthday"	
1998	Reading Rainbow	Herself	Voice; narrator; episode: "Math Curse"	
1998	Guys Like Us	Katie	Episode: "Maestro's First Crush"	
1998–1999	Figure It Out	Herself	Panelist; 12 episodes	
2000	A Father's Choice	Kelly McClain	Television film	
2000–2003	Buffy the Vampire Slayer	Dawn Summers	66 episodes; main role (seasons 5–7)	
2001–2003	Truth or Scare	Herself	Host and narrator; 20 episodes	
2004	Six Feet Under	Celeste	4 episodes; guest role (season 4)	
2005	The Dive from Clausen's Pier	Carrie Beal	Television film	
2006	House	Melinda Bardach	Episode: "Safe"	
2006–2018	Robot Chicken	Various characters	Voice; 6 episodes; guest role (seasons 2–3, 5 & 9)	
2006	Law & Order: Criminal Intent	Lisa Willow Tyler	Episode: "Weeping Willow"	
2008–2012	Gossip Girl	Georgina Sparks	28 episodes; recurring role (seasons 1–6)	
2008	The Circuit	Kylie Shines	Television film	
2009–2010	Mercy	Chloe Payne	22 episodes; main role (season 1)	
2009	The Super Hero Squad Show	Valkyrie	Voice; 2 episodes; guest role (season 1)	
2011	Love Bites	Jodie	3 episodes; guest role (season 1)	
2011	Weeds	Emma Karlin	5 episodes; guest role (season 7)	
2013	Criminal Minds	Diane Turner	Episode: "Zugzwang"	
2013	Killing Kennedy	Marina Oswald	Television film	
2013	NCIS: Los Angeles	Lily Lockhart	Episode: "Merry Evasion"	
2014–2015	Hollywood Game Night	Herself	Guest; 2 episodes	
2015	Sleepy Hollow	Abigail Adams	Episode: "Pittura Infamante"	
2015	SuperMansion	Blood Moon	Voice; episode: "A Midsummer Night's Ream"	
2015	The Christmas Gift	Megan	Television film	
2016	Chopped Junior	Herself	Guest judge; 1 episode	
2016	Sister Cities	Dallas Baxter	Television film	
2016	Last Week Tonight with John Oliver	Herself	Guest; 1 episode	
2021	Celebrity Wheel of Fortune	Herself	Celebrity contestant; 1 episode	
2022–2023	Gossip Girl	Georgina Sparks	2 episodes	
2023	Harriet the Spy	Dr. Wagner	Voice; episode: "I Am the Onion"	

=== Web series ===
Year	Title	Role	Notes	Ref.
2015	Guidance	Anna	6 episodes	
2018	Human Kind Of	Judy	Voice; 21 episodes	
2021	Meet, Marry, Murder	Host	13 episodes	

=== Music videos ===
Year	Title	Artist	Ref.
2004	"Echo"	Trapt	
2005	"Tired of Being Sorry"	Ringside	
2007	"This Ain't a Scene, It's an Arms Race"	Fall Out Boy	

== Awards and nominations ==
Year	Award	Category	Work	Result	Ref.
1997	Young Artist Award	Best Performance in a Feature Film: Leading Young Actress	Harriet the Spy	Won	
1998	Young Artist Award	Best Performance in a TV Comedy Series: Supporting Young Actress	Meego	Won	
2000	Young Artist Award	Best Young Actress in a Comedy Film	Inspector Gadget	Nominated	
2000	Young Artist Award	Best Performance in a Feature Film: Supporting Young Actress	Inspector Gadget	Nominated	
2001	Teen Choice Award	TV – Choice Sidekick	Buffy the Vampire Slayer	Nominated	
2001	Young Artist Award	Best Performance in a TV Drama Series: Supporting Young Actress	Buffy the Vampire Slayer	Won	
2001	Saturn Award	Best Supporting Actress on Television	Buffy the Vampire Slayer	Nominated	
2002	Young Artist Award	Best Performance in a TV Comedy Series: Leading Young Actress	Truth or Scare	Nominated	
2002	Young Artist Award	Best Performance in a TV Comedy Series: Guest Starring Young Actress	MADtv	Nominated	
2002	Saturn Award	Best Supporting Television Actress	Buffy the Vampire Slayer	Nominated	
2003	Saturn Award	Best Supporting Television Actress	Buffy the Vampire Slayer	Nominated	
2004	Daytime Emmy Award	Outstanding Performer in a Children's Series	Truth or Scare	Nominated	
2007	Sarasota Film Festival	Breakthrough Performer	Beautiful Ohio	Won	
2012	Teen Choice Award	Choice TV Villain	Gossip Girl	Nominated	
