= Voices from Beyond =

Film directed by Lucio Fulci

- DVD Cover
- Directed by: Lucio Fulci
- Screenplay by: Lucio Fulci; Piero Regnoli
- Story by: Lucio Fulci; Daniele Stroppa
- Based on: a short story by Lucio Fulci
- Produced by: Antononio Lucidi; Luigi Nannerini
- Starring: Duilio Del Prete; Karina Huff; Pascal Persiano
- Cinematography: Alessandro Grossi
- Edited by: Vincenzo Tomassi
- Music by: Stelvio Cipriani
- Production companies: Scena Film; Executive Cine TV
- Release date: 1991 (Italy)
- Running time: 89 minutes
- Country: Italy

Voices from Beyond (Italian: Voci dal profondo, lit. 'Voices From the Deep') is a 1991 Italian horror film by director Lucio Fulci. The original shooting title of the film was Urla dal profondo (transl. Scream From the Deep). The story centers around the murder of a wealthy man despised by most of his relatives, with his spirit returning from the afterlife to guide his daughter in uncovering the identity of his killer.

== Plot ==
Wealthy, middle-aged financier Giorgio Mainardi lies in a hospital bed surrounded by his family. He says "why?" before dying of an internal hemorrhage. The following day, Giorgio's daughter Rosie visits the Mainardi estate, having taken a leave of absence from her college studies to attend his funeral and the reading of the will. Rosie finds her family squabbling over the estate. Giorgio's stepmother Hilda, refuses permission for an autopsy. Her elderly husband, Giorgio's father Paolo, is also near death from a recent stroke and cannot move or speak. Hilda's son Mario is having an affair with Giorgio's third wife, Lucy. Lucy is slightly older than Rosie and is the only one there who shows any compassion for her presence.

Giorgio's spirit remains conscious after death, and from his buried coffin, he tries to communicate with Rosie. He eventually enters Rosie's dreams and implores her to discover who was responsible for his death. However, Rosie must hurry, for as his corpse rots away in the coffin, so does his power to communicate with her. At the funeral, each mourner thinks back to their relationship with Giorgio. Lucy remembers his anger at her frigidity; Mario recalls how Giorgio humiliated and insulted him after he asked for financial help in obtaining a business position; Hilda fumes over the memory of Giorgio ordering the bank not to let her cash the checks from his father's account; and Rita, Giorgio's mistress, remembers being spurned when Giorgio broke off their affair and decided to return to his wife.

At the reading of the will, disputs erupt when it is revealed that Giorgio left his entire estate to Rosie. Lucy, however, is allowed to remain at the house. But even she is angry, as no provision has been made to their child David, whom Giorgio believes was not his.

An autopsy on Giorgio goes ahead. After taking a sample of his intestines, the pathologist discovers lacerations to the interior wall. He puts the piece in a jar of formaldehyde for later inspection. Rosie and her college boyfriend Gianni later discover that the jar was "accidentally" smashed. However, Gianni, a medical student with access to the pathology lab, found splinters of glass in the intestines before the accident occurred later that night. He suggests that they go to the police. Still, Rosie insists that they investigate themselves rather than attract a public scandal.

According to Lucy, Giorgio returned from a visit to Rita the night of his collapse. Rosie suspects that Rita may have put the shards in his food. Lucy talks to the Maitre'd at a restaurant Rita and Giorgio frequented for their secret dates. The Maitre'd says that the couple pitched into an argument when they arrived over Giorgio wanting to end their clandestine affair. They left the restaurant without even drinking a glass of wine. Rosie returns to the house but accidentally discovers that her drinks have been poisoned when a hypodermic hole is found at the top of one of her soda cans. Rosie talks to Dorie, the housekeeper and David's nanny, who says that only she, David, and Lucy were in the house the night of Giorgio's death. Rosie sees David playing with a mortar and pestle.

After another dream, Rosie wakes up with the answer to the puzzle. The glass shards were concealed in the ice-cubes Giorgio took with his late-night drinks. Rosie confronts Lucy and reveals that Hilda and Mario must have hatched the plot. Hilda admits the plot to kill Giorgio for his money and adds that Lucy knew about the scheme but did nothing to stop them. In case of discovery, David was encouraged to play with the mortar and pestle, grinding up a light bulb into splinters and adding them to the water in the ice-cube tray as a "game." Hilda hoped to explain the murder away as an accident. Rosie tells Hilda that she will leave the conspirators to fester in the mansion together instead of informing the police. As she prepares to return to college, Rosie says that Giorgio's spirit will be everywhere, haunting them to the grave. At Giorgio's grave, Rosie explains how he died, and the two laugh.

== Cast ==
- Duilio Del Prete as Giorgio Mainardi
- Karina Huff as Rosie Mainardi
- Pascal Persiano as Mario Mainardi
- Lorenzo Flaherty as Gianni/ Tommy
- Bettina Giovannini as Lucy Mainardi
- Frances Nacman as Hilda Mainardi
- Lucio Fulci as Pathologist
- Paolo Paoloni as Grandpa Mainardi
- Sacha Maria Darwin as Dorie the housekeeper
- Antonella Tinazzo as Rita
- Tomasso Felleghy as manager
- Robert P Daniels as doctor

== Production ==
The plot for Voices from Beyond was written by Lucio Fulci and Daniele Stroppa, based on a short story Fulci had published in the Gazzetta di Firenze which was later collected in a 1992 anthology of Fulci's short stories titled Le lune nere. Fulci wrote the short story initially with the intention of developing it into a screenplay later. He asked screenwriter Piero Regnoli to work on the screenplay with him.

The film was made in early 1991. When filming, the crew had access to a villa once owned by Luchino Visconti.

The film's end credits added "This film is dedicated to my few real friends, in particular to Clive Barker and Claudio Carabba". Biographer Troy Howarth wrote "Barker's nightmarish visions of hellish horror definitely owe a bit to Fulci's celebrated horror films of the 1980s, of course, while Carabba was one of the few critics in Italy who took Fulci and his work seriously."

== Release ==
Voices from Beyond was screened at the Cannes Film Market on May 11, 1991 and received no further theatrical screenings after. Voices from Beyond was released as Voci dai profondo in Italy on home video by Empire in 1991.

It was released on home video in the United States and United Kingdom as Voices from Beyond with a running time of 85 minutes.

== Reception ==
Fulci spoke about the film stating he did "love it very much. It's a wonderful movie with the wrong cast" specifically describing Karina Huff as "unpleasant, Del Prete is completely out of the role, the mother-in-law is too wicked and you understand immediately that she is the killer."

In Mad Movies, a reviewer said that the Voices From Beyond gave them hope for Fulci's future work as a director after more recent work like Aenigma, Murder Rock and Sodoma's Ghost while finding his work on his more intellectual focus on the film and some techniques were "as ambitious as they are unsuccessful."
