= Trapt Live! =

Live album by Trapt
- Released: September 18, 2007
- Recorded: 2005; 2007 ("Stay Alive" and "Everything to Lose")
- Venues: The Quest, Minneapolis, MN
- Studios: MT Studios, Burbank, CA
- Genres: Post-grunge; alternative metal; nu metal
- Length: 52:50
- Labels: Eleven Seven; Zig Zag
- Producers: Trapt; Matt Thorne (add.)

Trapt chronology
Someone in Control (2005)	Trapt Live! (2007)	Only Through the Pain (2008)

Singles from Trapt Live!
- 1. "Stay Alive" Released: 2007

Professional ratings
Review scores
Source	Rating
AbsolutePunk	(88%)
Bullz-Eye.com	1.5/5 stars
Melodic	3.5/5 stars
Ultimate Guitar	7.3/10

Trapt Live! is the first live album by American rock band Trapt, released on September 18, 2007, by Eleven Seven Music. The live album contains two new studio tracks, "Stay Alive" and "Everything to Lose", while the rest was recorded during live performances. "Stay Alive" was released as a single in 2007.

== Track listing ==
All lyrics are written by Chris Taylor Brown; all music is composed by Trapt.

No.	Title	Length
1.	"Stay Alive" (Studio Recording)	3:36
2.	"Everything to Lose" (Studio Recording)	4:36
3.	"Still Frame"	6:53
4.	"Made of Glass"	4:21
5.	"Hollowman"	5:55
6.	"Stand Up"	4:04
7.	"Skin Deep"	3:43
8.	"Echo"	4:24
9.	"Disconnected (Out of Touch)"	4:39
10.	"Waiting"	4:45
11.	"Headstrong"	5:51
Total length:		52:50

== Other media ==
"Stay Alive" and "Made of Glass" found on Trapt.com in acoustic versions as well as nine videos released in 5.1 surround sound and stereo.

== Personnel ==
Trapt

- Chris Taylor Brown – lead vocals, rhythm guitar on "Echo"
- Simon Ormandy – lead guitar
- Pete Charell – bass
- Aaron Montgomery – drums

Production

- Trapt – producers
- Matt Thorne – additional production; engineering (1, 2); mixing (3-11)
- Josh Wilbur – mixing (1, 2)
- Brian "Big Bass" Gardner – mastering
- Evan Leake – artwork and layout
