= Enigmatic =

Enigmatic is an adjective meaning "mysterious" or "puzzling". It may also refer to:

- Enigmatic (album), a 1970 album by Czesław Niemen
- Enigmatic: Calling, a 2005 album by Norwegian progressive metal band Pagan's Mind
- Enigmatic scale, musical scale used by Verdi and others
- "The Enigmatic", a song by Joe Satriani on the album Not of This Earth

== See also ==
- Enigmatic leaf turtle, a species of Asian leaf turtle
- Enigmatic moray eel, a species found in the Pacific and Indian Oceans
- Glaresis, a genus of beetles sometimes called "enigmatic scarab beetles"
- Enigma (disambiguation)
