= Ænigma =

Ænigma or Aenigma may refer to:

- Aenigma (beetle), a genus of ground beetles
- Aenigma, the former name of a genus of jumping spiders from South Africa, now called Zulunigma
- Aenigma (film), a 1988 horror film by Lucio Fulci
- Ænigma (album), a 2013 album by In Vain
- "Aenigma", 2002 song by Luca Turilli from Prophet of the Last Eclipse

== See also ==
- Enigma (disambiguation)
