= Truth or Scare =

- The Truth or Scare intertitle.
- Written by: Kevin Barry
- Directed by: David R. Hale
- Presented by: Michelle Trachtenberg
- Composer: Don Grady
- Country of origin: United States
- Original language: English
- No. of seasons: 1
- No. of episodes: 22

Production
- Executive producers: Rasha Drachkovitch; Jim Rapsas
- Editor: Susan Barnes
- Camera setup: multiple camera set-up
- Running time: 22 minutes
- Production company: 44 Blue Productions

Original release
- Network: Discovery Channel; Discovery Kids
- Release: October 25, 2001 – January 1, 2003

Truth or Scare is an American television series on the Discovery Kids network. The show aired from October 25, 2001, to January 1, 2003. It was hosted by Michelle Trachtenberg in a style similar to Maila Nurmi as horror host "Vampira" and Cassandra Peterson as horror host "Elvira, Mistress of the Dark." The series first aired on Discovery Channel on October 25, 2001. After the series ended, reruns of the show aired on The Hub until October 29, 2012.

== Premise ==
In each episode, Trachtenberg appeared as the hostess/narrator telling the stories of famous hauntings and other paranormal phenomena in some sort of spooky goth subculture. The show's setting was in a styled library surrounded by props that relate to the episode's theme. She usually then said some short line or phrase. After that clips of the episode were shown, she then said something along the lines of "Next on Truth or Scare...". The show then continued onto Trachtenberg narrating stories about the topic while reenactments performed. She then explained some background information about the story. In between stories, commercial breaks are held, but before each break Michelle would give an intro to what the next story would be. The episodes themselves are actually documentaries that are presented to a younger audience (with most of the footage being intact), the most notable are the castle ghosts episodes which originate from the British documentary miniseries "Castle Ghosts of The British Isles".

== Episodes ==
1. "Castle Ghost of England" - Myths and legends of ghosts that are associated with the castles of England.
2. "Dracula" - The evolution of Bram Stoker's Dracula.
3. "Wolfman: The Myth and the Science" - The legend of the werewolf.
4. "The Curse of Tutankhamen" - A legend of a curse on the tomb of Pharaoh Tutankhamen.
5. "Castle Ghost of Ireland" - Past and present merge in the Ireland's castle halls of the world.
6. "Ghosthunters" - Modern "ghostbusters" investigate paranormal phenomenon.
7. "UFOs Over Phoenix" - The mysterious sightings of UFOs in Phoenix, Arizona.
8. "America's Haunted Houses" - People investigate reports of ghosts and mysterious happenings in America.
9. "Castle Ghost of Scotland" - Stories of Scotland's turbulent past tell of hauntings.
10. "Bigfoot" - The urban legend of Bigfoot.
11. "Night Visitors" - The Bell Witch; Mercy Brown vampire incident; Emily's Bridge; the Hammond Castle hauntings.
12. "The Bermuda Triangle" - The mysteries of the Bermuda Triangle.
13. "Castle Ghosts of Wales" - Haunted Welsh castles.
14. "The True Story of Halloween" - The history of Halloween.
15. "Hollywood Haunts" - Hollywood's notorious sites for being haunted.
16. "Haunted Hotels" - Historic hotels that have a reputation for being haunted.
17. "Scare Me" - Some people avoid being scared, while others seek out the thrill of it.
18. "Real Witches" - The history of witches.
19. "Loch Ness Monster" - The myth of the infamous Loch Ness Monster in Scotland.
20. "Psychic Science" - The practice of psychics and mediums.
21. "Roswell & Area 51"
22. "Crop Circles"

== Home media ==
The episode "The Curse of Tutankhamen" appears as a bonus feature on Tutenstein Volume 1: The Beginning.
