= No Apologies (Trapt album) =

Studio album by Trapt
- Released: October 12, 2010
- Studios: Groovemaster Studios (Chicago, Illinois); Maple Studios (Santa Ana, California)
- Genres: Hard rock; nu metal
- Length: 41:20
- Labels: Eleven Seven; Re:Wind Entertainment
- Producers: Johnny K; Trapt (co.)

Trapt chronology
Only Through the Pain (2008)	No Apologies (2010)	Headstrong (2011)

Trapt studio chronology
Only Through the Pain (2008)	No Apologies (2010)	Reborn (2013)

Singles from No Apologies
- 1. "Sound Off" Released: July 20, 2010; 2. "Stranger in the Mirror" Released: August 2010

No Apologies is the fourth studio album by American rock band Trapt, released on October 12, 2010, under Eleven Seven Music. It is their last album to feature long-time drummer Aaron "Monty" Montgomery, and is the first studio album to feature Robb Torres on guitar. (Note: Torres didn't perform or write on Only Through the Pain, but was credited) It is also their last album released under Eleven Seven, as they departed the label in 2011.

== Background and recording ==
Robb Torres joined the band in 2008, shortly after guitarist Simon Ormandy quit the band and Only Through the Pain had released that same year; Torres had been friends with drummer Aaron "Monty" Montgomery for years at that point, before Montgomery had even joined Trapt, and Montgomery had called Torres to initially fill in for a show they had booked.

When interviewed by Noisecreep, Torres described the band's return to their hard rock roots on the album an "unspoken thing." Torres explained that much of No Apologies came from the band jamming together at their rehearsal spot for about three weeks, starting with "these 20-minute kind of funky improv jams where we would get loose and get into it." The track that kicked off the recording sessions was "The Wind," which Torres nearly finished during touring for Only Through the Pain. The band teamed up with producer Johnny K (3 Doors Down, Plain White T's, Sevendust), and recorded the album over a period of two months. Torres said of Johnny K: "He knows how to get good sounds. He's very straightforward. He knows what to do to make the song good. Luckily we weren't really that far off, so it was an easy process. I think after so many years of writing songs, working with different producers and stuff, you just start to know what a good, solid track should be like as far as arrangements and things like that."

Trapt's label, Eleven Seven, described the album as emphasizing "themes of individuality and personal conviction, aligning with Trapt’s message of resilience and self-empowerment." The album artwork features a collage of fan-submitted photos for the band's "Sound Off" campaign, in the shape of the band's T-shaped icon.

== Release and reception ==
Professional ratings
Review scores
Source	Rating
AllMusic	3/5 stars
Alternative Addiction	3.5/5 stars
Ultimate Guitar	7/10

The album's lead single, "Sound Off," was released on July 20, 2010, and broke into the top 25 on Billboard's Mainstream Rock chart. A second single, "Stranger in the Mirror," was released as a free download on the band's Facebook page in August 2010. The album released on October 12, 2010, debuting on the US Billboard 200 at number 25, selling around 71,000 copies. A deluxe edition of the album was released with a bonus DVD exclusively at Best Buy.

A writer for Alternative Addiction noted how a majority of the album leans more towards rock than the pop aesthetics of the band's self-titled debut, commending Torres' guitar work for being an admirable replacement for Ormandy, Brown for his catchy lyrical hooks. Gregory Heaney of AllMusic said that the record contains "a heavier, harder-edged sound" while still retaining the radio appeal of the band's previous works, concluding that "With this tighter, more aggressive approach, Trapt fans should be pleased to hear that the band is still able to keep things fresh after all these years."

== Track listing ==
All lyrics are written by Chris Taylor Brown; all music is composed by Trapt.

No.	Title	Length
1.	"Sound Off"	3:28
2.	"Drama Queen"	3:39
3.	"End of My Rope"	4:00
4.	"Get Up"	3:18
5.	"No Apologies"	3:46
6.	"Stranger in the Mirror"	3:24
7.	"Beautiful Scar"	3:36
8.	"Are You with Me"	3:44
9.	"The Wind"	4:04
10.	"Overloaded"	3:50
11.	"Storyteller"	4:23
Total length:		41:20

"Head Up High" was released as a bonus track through Trapt’s website.

== Personnel ==
=== Trapt ===
- Chris Taylor Brown – lead vocals, rhythm guitar
- Pete Charell – bass guitar
- Aaron "Monty" Montgomery – drums
- Robb Torres – lead guitar

=== Technical personnel ===
- Johnny K – producer, mixing, engineer
- Trapt – co-producers
- Cameron Webb – engineer, digital editing
- Ted Jensen – mastering
- Matt Dougherty – digital editing
- Daniel Salcido – assistant engineer
- Sergio Chavez – assistant engineer
- Stephen Hernandez – assistant engineer
- Evan Leake – art & layout

== Charts ==
Album

Chart (2010)	Peak position
US Billboard 200	25
US Independent Albums (Billboard)	4
US Top Alternative Albums (Billboard)	5
US Top Hard Rock Albums (Billboard)	3
US Top Rock Albums (Billboard)	7

Singles

Year	Song	US Main.	US Hot Rock	US Act. Rock	US Rock Digital
2010	"Sound Off"	16	33	13	—
2010	"End of My Rope"	—	—	—	44
