= Resurrection (Trapt album) =

Studio album by Trapt
- Released: September 11, 2026
- Recorded: 2025–2026
- Genres: Alternative metal; nu metal; hard rock
- Length: 38:48
- Label: Crash Collide
- Producer: Trapt

Trapt chronology
The Fall (2024)	Resurrection (2026)

Alternative cover

Resurrection is the ninth studio album by American rock band Trapt, released physically on September 11, 2026, with a digital release following sometime in 2027, via the band's own Crash Collide Records. It follows their 2024 album, The Fall, and precedes their "Then Til Now" tour.

Clocking in at nearly 39 minutes, Resurrection is Trapt's shortest studio album to date.

== Background ==
Resurrection's existence was first confirmed in April 2025, during the band's acoustic tour that same year. In several interviews, frontman Chris Taylor Brown promised the album would include the heaviest music Trapt has made. Brown said: "A lot of bands say, 'These are our best songs' when they put out a new album, but we haven’t said that ... we're thinking this album — we're excited. It's heavy, it's melodic, it's good songwriting. Everything that Trapt does well, these songs are showcasing it."

The band performed "Bandages" and "I Did My Time" during their 2025 tour. From March to September 2026, the band posted numerous music video previews for "Bend So Much," "I Did My Time," "No One Home," "Volatile," "Expiration Date," and "Trauma Bond." The album was completed by August 2026.

Resurrection marks the return of the band's Crash Collide record label, after it was renamed to New Legacy Recordings for The Fall.

== Release ==
The album was officially announced in March of 2026. The album's pre-order was made available on April 10, with three tracks; "Bend So Much," "No One Home," "I Did My Time;" being available digitally through the album's purchase. The album’s physical release date was set to September 11, 2026, with streaming and other digital outlets getting it sometime in 2027.

=== Commercial performance ===
Prior to Resurrection's release, by September 3, 2026, roughly 800 CDs and 400 vinyl had sold, marking a combined total of roughly 1,200 units sold. The album didn't make it to any US Billboard charts.

=== Touring ===
Trapt embarked on the "Then Til Now" tour the day after the album released, on September 12, 2026, with Sygnal to Noise as the openers. The tour will see the band performing their 2002 self-titled debut in its entirety, as well as songs from Resurrection. It also marks the 25th anniversary of the band signing a record deal.

== Track listing ==
All tracks are written by Chris Taylor Brown.

Resurrection
No.	Title	Length
1.	"Expiration Date"	4:03
2.	"Volatile"	3:57
3.	"Trauma Bond"	3:47
4.	"Bend So Much"	4:01
5.	"Anywhere with You"	3:41
6.	"No One Home"	4:31
7.	"Burning Bridges"	3:12
8.	"Sanctuary"	4:28
9.	"Bandages"	3:30
10.	"I Did My Time"	3:31
Total length:		38:48

== Personnel ==
=== Trapt ===
- Chris Taylor Brown – vocals, guitar
- Pete Charell – bass guitar
- Shawn Sonnenschein – guitar
- Mitch Moore – drums

=== Production ===
- Trapt – producers
- Pete Charell – mixing
