= Enigmata =

Enigmata or Aenigmata may refer to:

- Enigmata (album), by John Zorn
- Enigmata, one hundred (hexa)metrical riddles by Aldhelm
- Enigmata, a collection of riddles by Saint Boniface
- Aenigmata, a collection of riddles by Symphosius
- Enigmata Tatwini, a collection of riddles by Tatwine
- Enigmata Eusebii, a collection of riddles by someone called Eusebius

== See also ==
- Enigma (disambiguation)
