= Glaresis medialis =

Scientific classification
- Domain: Eukaryota
- Kingdom: Animalia
- Phylum: Arthropoda
- Class: Insecta
- Order: Coleoptera
- Suborder: Polyphaga
- Infraorder: Scarabaeiformia
- Family: Glaresidae
- Genus: Glaresis
- Species: G. medialis

Binomial name
- Glaresis medialis Gordon, 1969

Species of beetle

Glaresis medialis is a species of enigmatic scarab beetle in the family Glaresidae. It is found in North America.
