= Glaresis canadensis =

Scientific classification
- Domain: Eukaryota
- Kingdom: Animalia
- Phylum: Arthropoda
- Class: Insecta
- Order: Coleoptera
- Suborder: Polyphaga
- Infraorder: Scarabaeiformia
- Family: Glaresidae
- Genus: Glaresis
- Species: G. canadensis

Binomial name
- Glaresis canadensis Brown, 1928

Species of beetle

Glaresis canadensis is a species of enigmatic scarab beetle in the family Glaresidae. It is found in North America.
