= Reborn (Trapt album) =

Studio album by Trapt
- Released: January 22, 2013
- Recorded: 2010–2012
- Studio: MT Studios (Burbank, California)
- Genres: Alternative metal; post-grunge; pop; hard rock
- Length: 41:14
- Labels: Epochal Artists; EMI; Caroline; Crash Collide
- Producers: Chris Taylor Brown; Matt Thorne (add.)

Trapt chronology
Headstrong (2011)	Reborn (2013)	Snapshot: Trapt (2013)

Trapt studio chronology
No Apologies (2010)	Reborn (2013)	DNA (2016)

Singles from Reborn
- 1. "Bring It" Released: October 31, 2011; 2. "Love Hate Relationship" Released: October 2012

Reborn is the fifth studio album by American rock band Trapt, released on January 22, 2013, through Epochal Artists Records, with distribution through Caroline and EMI Label Services. This is their last album with guitarist Robb Torres before he would leave the band the same year, and also the first album with drummer Dylan Howard. The album was produced by lead vocalist Chris Taylor Brown, with additional production, engineering, and mixing by Matt Thorne, who produced the band's live album Trapt Live! and compilation album Headstrong.

== Background and composition ==
Following the release of 2010's No Apologies, the band's label, Eleven Seven, attempted to change their deal with Trapt from a 50-50 digital deal to an 80–20, with singer Chris Taylor Brown also stating the label didn't push the singles or the album, causing the band to depart. Following this, the band realized they had new-found freedom away from a label. Brown, in an interview with Noisecreep, stated: "We've already made four videos from this record, we're in full control so it's fun, and we can do what we want. Being in control of every aspect of what we do is something we've wanted for a long time and we're making the most of it. Even to be able to make all these videos like this has been amazing. We saved so much money in how we produced the record, it allowed us to do it."

In regards to the album's sound, Brown stated: "This record is really a new sound for Trapt. With Reborn, we really wanted to use new sounds and textures as well as experiment with delays, reverbs, synths, and many other techniques we have learned over the years or have heard in our influences." Lyrically, Brown has described the album as being the deepest they've done. Musically, the album has been described as alternative metal, post-grunge, pop, and hard rock.

== Release ==
Professional ratings
Review scores
Source	Rating
AllMusic	3/5 stars
Music Connection	7/10 stars
Ultimate Guitar	6.7/10

The first single, "Bring It," was released on October 31, 2011. A second single, "Love Hate Relationship," was released in October 2012.

Reborn was set to be released on November 20, 2012, but was delayed and released in two versions on January 22, 2013; a standard edition with 11 tracks, and a deluxe edition with 17 total tracks, including acoustic covers and an original acoustic track titled "Avelyn," which has been described as a fan-favorite. A music video for "Living in the Eye of the Storm" was released in February 2013, paying tribute to US soldiers.

The album received mostly positive reviews from critics, and is Trapt's fifth album to crack the Billboard top 50, peaking at number 44 and selling 8,700 copies in its first week.

== Track listing ==
All tracks are written by Chris Taylor Brown, except where noted.

Reborn
No.	Title	Writer(s)	Length
1.	"Bring It"		3:39
2.	"Love Hate Relationship"		4:13
3.	"Experience"		3:52
4.	"Living in the Eye of the Storm"	Brown; Adam Malka	3:51
5.	"Livewire (Light Me Up)"		4:08
6.	"Strength in Numbers"		4:00
7.	"Get Out of Your Own Way"		3:42
8.	"Going Under"	Brown; Russell W. Howard	3:18
9.	"Too Close"	Brown; Malka	3:09
10.	"When It Rains"		3:50
11.	"You're No Angel"		3:32
Total length:			41:14

Reborn deluxe edition
No.	Title	Length
12.	"Bring It" (Acoustic)	3:32
13.	"Love Hate Relationship" (Acoustic)	3:52
14.	"Experience" (Acoustic)	3:48
15.	"Living in the Eye of the Storm" (Acoustic)	3:34
16.	"Too Close" (Acoustic)	3:14
17.	"Avelyn"	3:55
Total length:		1:03:09

== Personnel ==
=== Trapt ===
- Chris Taylor Brown – lead vocals, rhythm guitar, samples, keys & synths
- Robb Torres – lead guitar
- Pete Charell – bass
- Dylan Howard – drums

=== Additional performers ===
- Aaron "Monty" Montgomery – drums

=== Production ===
- Chris Taylor Brown – producer
- Matt Thorne – additional production, engineering, mixing
- Pete Charell – additional engineering
- Dave Donnelly – mastering

=== Album art ===
- Valerie Taylor – cover artwork
- Casey Quintal – design

== Charts ==
Chart (2013)	Peak position
US Billboard 200	44
US Independent Albums (Billboard)	8
US Top Hard Rock Albums (Billboard)	1
US Top Rock Albums (Billboard)	14

Singles

Year	Song	US Main.	US Act. Rock
2012	"Bring It"	19	17
2013	"Love Hate Relationship"	29	27
