= DNA (Trapt album) =

Studio album by Trapt
- Released: August 19, 2016
- Recorded: 2015–2016
- Studios: The Omen Room, Stanton, California
- Genres: Hard rock; alternative metal; post-grunge
- Length: 60:01
- Labels: The End; ADA; Crash Collide
- Producers: Trapt; Adam Malka (add.); Russell W. Howard (add.); Shawn Guckian (add.)

Trapt chronology
The Acoustic Collection (2014)	DNA (2016)	Shadow Work (2020)

Trapt studio chronology
Reborn (2013)	DNA (2016)	Shadow Work (2020)

Singles from DNA
- 1. "Passenger" Released: June 16, 2015; 2. "Human (Like the Rest of Us)" Released: August 28, 2015; 3. "It's Over" Released: November 2015; 4. "Tangled Up in You" Released: August 5, 2016

DNA is the sixth studio album by American rock band Trapt, released on August 19, 2016, through the band's own label, Crash Collide, alongside ADA and The End Records. It is the only Trapt album to feature Ty Fury on guitar, as well as the last to have Dylan Howard on drums.

== Background ==
In 2014, the band launched an Indiegogo campaign for the album, with a $50k goal. Its goal was met two weeks early, and by that point, the band had begun writing the album. Frontman Chris Taylor Brown said about the writing progress: "We had some good music and this and that, a few lyrical ideas. But really the bulk of the music was written in March and April of 2015 and then the lyrics poured out right around March, April, May, June. We started recording it in July [2015], and we were still recording new songs for it even [in early 2016]. So we were writing, it took about a year, I think." The band had recorded and produced the album themselves, with bassist Pete Charell allowing them to record at his own studio, The Omen Room, in California.

Brown has said the album is mainly about unity vs. division. When asked about the single, "Human (Like the Rest of Us)," he stated: "I see a lot of division in America. That's what a lot of the themes are in DNA. Just a lot of division. Our motto of this country is "United We Stand, Divided We Fall." That's so true but if we continue to splinter into different groups based on race, religion, sexual orientation. We will never unite and make each other better, it's just not going to happen." Brown has also stated "This album is really about the fans and all the amazing insight I was able to put into the lyrics for DNA, by asking them so many deep questions and discussing so many controversial topics through our Facebook page for the year and a half we were writing and recording DNA."

== Release and reception ==
Professional ratings
Review scores
Source	Rating
AllMusic	3/5 stars
Ultimate Guitar	4.7/10

The band was originally set to release the album in 2015, with the album officially releasing on August 19, 2016. Best Buy offered a limited edition, which included the two bonus tracks "Panic Room" and "Chasing Highs", as well as the front cover of the insert sleeve being autographed by the band.

DNA became Trapt's first album since Amalgamation to miss the top 100 on the US Billboard 200, peaking at number 148, selling only 4,500 copies in its first week. Critical reception was mixed, with Heavy Magazine describing the album as "dull, whiny, dull some more, and more suited to the discographies of pop star rock star wannabes – not to mention it’s very lyrically poor." AllMusic's Neil Z. Yeung gave the album three out of five stars, saying "DNA might feel fairly repetitive, with many songs -- "Tangled Up in You," "Passenger," "Getting Even," and "Fallen Angel" -- getting lost in the shuffle. Nonetheless, the best moments of DNA are catchy and passionate."

== Track listing ==
All lyrics are written by Chris Taylor Brown; all music is composed by Brown and Pete Charell.

DNA
No.	Title	Length
1.	"Intro"	0:40
2.	"Human (Like the Rest of Us)"	4:07
3.	"It's Over"	3:28
4.	"Tangled Up in You"	4:07
5.	"Changing Hands"	4:14
6.	"Unforgiven"	3:55
7.	"Passenger"	3:52
8.	"Anchor"	4:21
9.	"Not So Different"	3:28
10.	"Castaway"	3:58
11.	"Getting Even"	3:57
12.	"Fallen Angel"	4:04
13.	"Human (Like the Rest of Us)" (Acoustic)	4:05
14.	"Tangled Up in You" (Acoustic)	3:50
15.	"Passenger" (Acoustic)	4:09
16.	"Castaway" (Acoustic)	3:51
Total length:		60:01

Best Buy limited edition
No.	Title	Length
13.	"Panic Room" (Best Buy bonus track)	3:44
14.	"Chasing Highs" (Best Buy bonus track)	3:37
Total length:		67:38

== Personnel ==
=== Trapt ===
- Chris Taylor Brown – vocals, guitar
- Pete Charell – bass guitar
- Ty Fury – guitar
- Dylan Howard – drums

=== Production ===
- Trapt – producers
- Pete Charell – engineering
- Chris Lord-Alge – mixing
- Ted Jensen – mastering
- Dan Horton – additional mastering
- Matt Borden, Allan Hessler, Mic McMullen, Steve Evetts, Bill Urban, Mark Leinhart – additional engineers
- Cameron Webb – additional mixing ("Unforgiven" and "Fallen Angel")
- Adam Malka, Russell W. Howard – additional producers ("It's Over")
- Shawn Guckian – additional producer ("Human (Like The Rest Of Us)")
- Mattias Frisk – album artwork
- Shawn Lyon – album layout

== Charts ==
Album

Chart (2016)	Peak position
US Billboard 200	148
US Independent Albums (Billboard)	10
US Top Album Sales (Billboard)	50
US Top Alternative Albums (Billboard)	11
US Top Current Album Sales (Billboard)	42
US Top Hard Rock Albums (Billboard)	4
US Top Rock Albums (Billboard)	15

Singles

Year	Song	US Main.
2015	"Passenger"	24
2016	"It's Over"	33
