= Who's Going Home with You Tonight? =

Single by Trapt

from the album Only Through the Pain
- Released: June 10, 2008
- Recorded: 2007–08
- Genre: Alternative rock
- Length: 3:35
- Label: Eleven Seven
- Composers: Chris Taylor Brown; Pete Charell; Aaron Montgomery; Robb Torres; Simon Ormandy
- Lyricist: Chris Taylor Brown
- Producers: Garth Richardson; Trapt

Trapt singles chronology
"Stay Alive" (2007)	"Who's Going Home with You Tonight?" (2008)	"Contagious" (2009)

Music video
- "Who's Going Home with You Tonight?" on YouTube

"Who's Going Home with You Tonight?" is the first single from American rock band Trapt's 2008 album Only Through the Pain, released on June 10, 2008, via Eleven Seven Music.

== Release ==
"Who's Going Home with You Tonight?" was released on June 10, 2008. Its music video, directed by Paul Brown, was released exclusively on Xbox Live that same day. The video features singer Chris Taylor Brown, who, from his perspective, exposes a girlfriend for cheating with three different men. It has been described as "a raw and unique male perspective on romance, relationships, and the nuances in between, keeping Trapt's rock edge while displaying their songwriting abilities."

The single was successful at release, reaching numbers 11 and 12 on the Billboard Active Rock and Mainstream Rock charts respectively, and receiving heavy rotation on US and Canadian rock stations.

== Personnel ==
Trapt

- Chris Taylor Brown – vocals, rhythm guitar
- Pete Charell – bass
- Robb Torres – lead guitar
- Aaron "Monty" Montgomery – drums
- Simon Ormandy – guitars

Production

- Garth Richardson – producer
- Trapt – producers
- Josh Wilbur – mixing
- Dave Donnelly – mastering

== Charts ==
Chart (2008)	Peak position
Canada Rock (Billboard)	50
US Active Rock Tracks (Billboard)	11
US Mainstream Rock Tracks (Billboard)	12
US Modern Rock Tracks (Billboard)	31
