= Copenhagen Post & Tele Museum =

Former postal museum in Copenhagen, Denmark

Post & Tele Museum
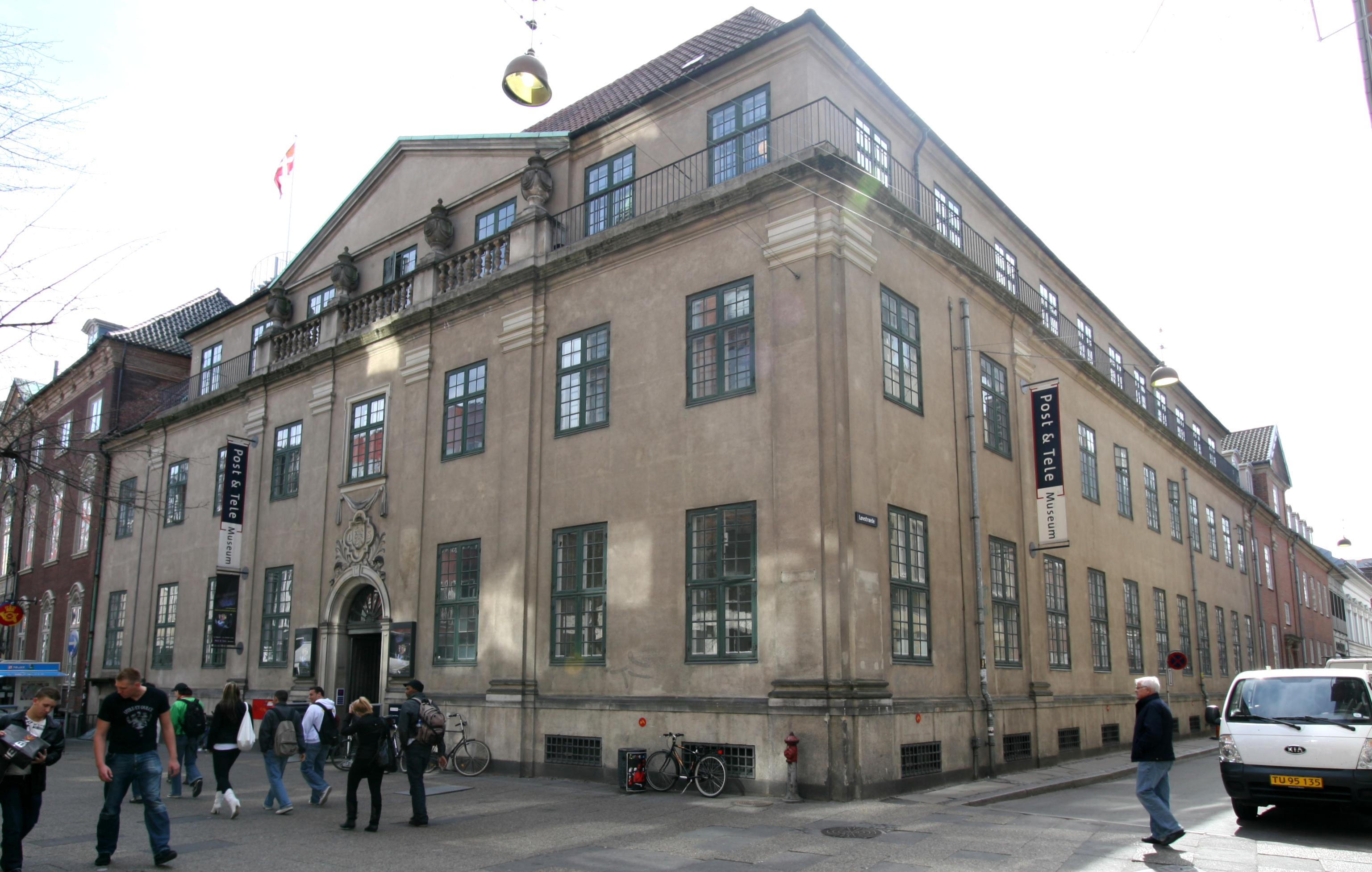
- Established: 1913; 113 years ago
- Location: Købmagergade 37, Copenhagen
- Coordinates: 55°40′50″N 12°34′39″E
- Visitors: 265.572 (2013)
- Website: ptt-museum.dk

The Post & Tele Museum was Denmark’s national museum of post and telecommunications from 1913 to 2017. In January 2017 it reopened in a new location as Enigma - Museum for Post, Tele og Kommunikation (Enigma - Museum of Post, Telecommunication and Communication).

== History ==
The museum opened in 1913 in the Central Post Office building in Tietgensgade with a stamp collection and objects collected by former Head Postmaster of Copenhagen, Jens Wilken Mørch. He started collecting the items when he began working for the Danish Post Office in 1856. He gave the collection to postal authorities in 1907, with the items being stored in the Post Yard in Købmagergade until the museum was opened.

When in 1927 the postal and telegraph services were merged, the collections of the museum were extended with objects related to telecommunications.

From July 1940 to 1945 the collections of the museum had to be put into storage, so the German occupying forces could use the premises for the censorship of letters.

After moving a few more times the museum opened in a new location in Købmagergade in 1998, where it remained until its closure in 2015 in preparation for its relocation to Øster Alle, Østerbro.

== Online archive ==
Like other Danish archives the museum has digitalized parts of its archive and made it available to the public via the Internet. This includes the yearbooks of the postal service, several thousand portraits of the postal employees and the phone books of Copenhagen from 1880 to 1965. While the physical museum and archive closed in 2015 for the relocation, their online presence is uninterrupted.
