= Zulunigma =

Scientific classification
- Kingdom: Animalia
- Phylum: Arthropoda
- Subphylum: Chelicerata
- Class: Arachnida
- Order: Araneae
- Infraorder: Araneomorphae
- Family: Salticidae
- Genus: Zulunigma; Wesolowska & Cumming, 2011
- Species: Z. incognita

Binomial name
- Zulunigma incognita (Wesolowska & Haddad, 2009)

Genus of spiders

Zulunigma is a monotypic genus of South African jumping spiders containing the single species, Zulunigma incognita. It was first described by Wanda Wesołowska & M. S. Cumming in 2011, and is found in South Africa. It was originally called Aenigma, but this name was given to at least three other animal genera, and it was replaced by Zulunigma in 2011.
