= Shadow Work (Trapt album) =

- Standard edition; the deluxe edition includes "DELUXE EDITION" written at the top

Studio album by Trapt
- Released: July 3, 2020
- Recorded: 2018–2019
- Studios: Dexter Dog Studios, Orange County, California; Fat Tracks Studios, Cincinnati, Ohio
- Genres: Post-grunge; alternative rock; pop rock
- Length: 48:47
- Labels: Crash Collide; The Label Group; New Legacy
- Producer: Trapt

Trapt chronology
DNA (2016)	Shadow Work (2020)	The Fall (2024)

Singles from Shadow Work
- 1. "Make It Out Alive" Released: May 15, 2020; 2. "Tell Me How You Really Feel" Released: May 15, 2020; 3. "Far Enough Away" Released: May 22, 2020; 4. "Fire" Released: January 15, 2021

Singles from Shadow Work (Deluxe Edition)
- 1. "Turn Me Around Again (Acoustic)" Released: February 5, 2021; 2. "Far Enough Away (Acoustic)" Released: April 2, 2021; 3. "Make It Out Alive (Acoustic)" Released: April 30, 2021; 4. "Fire (Acoustic)" Released: June 11, 2021

Shadow Work is the seventh studio album by American rock band Trapt, released on July 3, 2020 through The Label Group, as well as the band's own label, Crash Collide. It is the only Trapt album to feature Brendan Hengle on guitar (Note: Hengle contributed to three tracks on 2024's The Fall before his departure in 2021, but was uncredited) and Adam Prentice on drums. (Note: Drummer Mike Smith was instead credited, although he didn't perform on the album) The album was a critical and commercial failure at release.

== Background ==
The album's two lead singles, "Make It Out Alive" and "Tell Me How You Really Feel," were released on the same day, May 15, 2020. "Make It Out Alive" was the last song written for the album, with frontman Chris Taylor Brown framing it as a crisis survivor anthem, saying: "I hope it inspires people to never give up. Times can get so tough and it can be easy to just want to let go of all the struggle. But I think the struggles we go through define us. Each crisis we go through, staring into an abyss of the unknown, makes us stronger when we come out the other side." "Save Your Soul," a cover of the Jewel song, was made available exclusively through the album's pre-order. Artist Travis Livingstone created cover art for the album and directed a lyric video for "Make It Out Alive;" however, he later claimed that Brown was dodging payments over his work for the band.

Prior to the album's release, Brown described Shadow Work as "the best piece of music Trapt has put out," while also jokingly calling it "probably one of the top 5 albums that will ever exist for all of time."

== Critical and commercial reception ==
Professional ratings
Review scores
Source	Rating
AllMusic	2.5/5 stars
Metal Forever	3/10

Shadow Work was set to release on June 19, 2020, before being pushed to July 3 of that same year.

Shadow Work sold 600 copies in its first week, an 87% decrease from 2016's DNA and significantly below the 5,400 anticipated sales. This was the first studio Trapt release to miss the US Billboard 200, however, its official SoundScan data apparently put it at no. 22 on Billboard's Current Alternative Albums chart. Brown disputed these figures, claiming sales among the several thousand. Brown's subsequent social media use got the band's accounts suspended and led to drummer Mike Smith leaving Trapt. The band's subsequent tours were poorly attended.

AllMusic's Neil Z. Yeung rated the album 2.5 out of 5 stars, writing that the album offers "some polished anthems to balance with their typical crunchy assault" and particularly praises the band's cover of "Who Will Save Your Soul."

== Track listing ==
All tracks are written by Chris Taylor Brown, except where noted.

Shadow Work
No.	Title	Writer(s)	Length
1.	"Make It Out Alive"		3:30
2.	"I Want To Want What I Want"		3:53
3.	"Tell Me How You Really Feel"		4:10
4.	"Too Little Too Late"		4:04
5.	"Far Enough Away"		4:15
6.	"Turn Me Around Again"		3:13
7.	"Trying Too Hard"		3:27
8.	"Let Me Down Slowly"		3:11
9.	"Too Far Away"		3:59
10.	"Get You Back"		3:32
11.	"Hold and Be Held"		3:28
12.	"Save Your Soul" (Jewel cover)	Jewel Kilcher	3:59
13.	"Fire" (Bonus Track)		4:03
Total length:			48:47

Shadow Work deluxe tracks
No.	Title	Length
14.	"Fire" (Acoustic)	4:14
15.	"Make It Out Alive" (Acoustic)	3:27
16.	"Tell Me How You Really Feel" (Acoustic)	4:08
17.	"Far Enough Away" (Acoustic)	4:15
18.	"Turn Me Around Again" (Acoustic)	3:06
19.	"Let Me Down Slowly" (Acoustic)	3:15
Total length:		60:11

Notes

- The digital deluxe edition includes "Fire" as the opening track.

== Personnel ==
=== Trapt ===
- Chris Taylor Brown – lead vocals, rhythm guitar
- Pete Charell – bass guitar, backing vocals
- Brendan Hengle – lead guitar
- Mike Smith – drums

=== Production ===
- Trapt – producers
- Pete Charell – engineering at Fat Tracks Studio, production
- Jack Daniels – engineering, mixing at Dexter Doc Studio
- Mike Kalajian – mastering at Rogue Planet Mastering
- Adam Prentice – drums (uncredited)
- Travis Livingstone – cover art
- Rob Nadler – engineering at Fat Tracks Studio

== Charts ==
Chart (2020)	Peak position
US Current Alternative Albums (Billboard)	22

== See also ==
- 2020 in American music
- List of 2020 albums
