= Only Through the Pain =

Studio album by Trapt
- Released: August 5, 2008
- Recorded: 2006–2008
- Studios: The Farm (Vancouver, Canada); Warehouse (Vancouver, Canada); Charell’s Temple (Laguna Hills, California)
- Genres: Hard rock; post-grunge; alternative rock; pop metal
- Length: 45:15
- Labels: Eleven Seven; Zig Zag
- Producers: GGGarth; Trapt

Trapt chronology
Trapt Live! (2007)	Only Through the Pain (2008)	No Apologies (2010)

Trapt studio chronology
Someone in Control (2005)	Only Through the Pain (2008)	No Apologies (2010)

Singles from Only Through the Pain
- 1. "Who's Going Home with You Tonight?" Released: June 10, 2008; 2. "Contagious" Released: February 17, 2009

Only Through the Pain is the third studio album by American rock band Trapt. It was released on August 5, 2008, through Allen Kovac and Nikki Sixx's label, Eleven Seven Music. It is the last album to feature guitarist Simon Ormandy, who left the band before the album's announcement in 2008. Ormandy was replaced by Robb Torres, and although Torres didn't perform on the record, both individuals are credited in the album's liner notes.

== Background and production ==
By the time work on the album began, the band's relationship with their label, Warner Bros. Records, was already strained, in part due to their 2005 album, Someone in Control, not meeting the label's expectations. The label quietly dropped the band from their roster and began ignoring the band's emails. Irritated, the band emailed the label saying they were leaving, and began shopping demos around to new labels, ultimately signing to Eleven Seven, which, at the time, was distributed by Warner Bros. The band went up to Canada to work on the album with Garth "GGGarth" Richardson, who produced the band's self-titled record.

== Composition ==
Musically, Only Through the Pain has been described as a hard rock, post-grunge, alternative rock, and pop metal album. IGN's Ed Thompson said that the band gave "emo-filled angst" through every song.

== Release, promotion, and reception ==
Professional ratings
Review scores
Source	Rating
About	2.5/5 stars
AllMusic	3.5/5 stars
Audiversity	Excellent
EveryJoe	4/5
IGN	5.8/10
TuneLab	9/10
Ultimate Guitar	7/10

The debut single "Who's Going Home with You Tonight?" was released on June 10, and peaked at #12 on Billboard's Mainstream Rock Airplay chart and #11 on the Active Rock chart by the end of the month. The album was released on August 5, debuting at number 18 on the US Billboard 200 and number four on the US Top Rock Albums chart, and selling 25,000 copies in its first week. "Contagious" was released as the second single in 2009, also making its way to the Mainstream Rock Airplay and Active Rock charts, peaking at #18 and #15 respectively.

To promote the album, the band set up a social network, "OnlyThroughThePain," where fans could stream the album, download customizable Trapt content, and interact with other fans as well as the band. That summer, the band embarked on the Crüe Fest tour, opening for Mötley Crüe alongside openers Buckcherry, Sixx:A.M., and Papa Roach.

The album received mixed to positive reviews from critics.

== Track listing ==
All lyrics are written by Chris Taylor Brown, except where noted; all music is composed by Trapt.

No.	Title	Writer(s)	Length
1.	"Wasteland"	Chris Taylor Brown; Dave Bassett	3:45
2.	"Who's Going Home with You Tonight?"		3:35
3.	"Contagious"	Brown; Bassett	4:23
4.	"Black Rose"	Brown; Adam Malka	4:41
5.	"Ready When You Are"		4:57
6.	"Forget About the Rain"		3:28
7.	"Cover Up"		3:45
8.	"Only One in Color"		4:18
9.	"Wherever She Goes"		3:42
10.	"Curiosity Kills"		4:21
11.	"The Last Tear"		4:15
Total length:			45:15

== Personnel ==
Trapt

- Chris Taylor Brown – vocals, rhythm guitar
- Pete Charell – bass
- Aaron "Monty" Montgomery – drums
- Robb Torres – lead guitar
- Simon Ormandy – guitars

Other

- Paul Rayner Brown – photography
- Mike Cashin – mixing
- Ben Kaplan – engineering, programming, additional guitars
- Evan Leake – artwork, design
- Adam Malka – composition
- Garth Richardson – production
- Trapt – production
- Scott Ternan – engineering
- Josh Wilbur – mixing
- James Michael – mixing

== Charts ==
Album

Chart (2008)	Peak position
US Billboard 200	18
US Independent Albums (Billboard)	2
US Top Alternative Albums (Billboard)	4
US Top Hard Rock Albums (Billboard)	2
US Top Rock Albums (Billboard)	4

Singles

Year	Song	US Alt.	US Main.	US Hot Rock	US Act. Rock	CAN Rock
2008	"Who's Going Home with You Tonight?"	31	12	—	11	50
2009	"Contagious"	—	18	36	15	—
