= The Fall (Trapt album) =

Studio album by Trapt
- Released: May 31, 2024
- Recorded: 2021–2024
- Genre: Alternative rock
- Length: 54:35
- Label: New Legacy
- Producer: Trapt

Trapt chronology
| Shadow Work (2020) | The Fall (2024) | Resurrection (2026) |

Singles from The Fall
- 1. "Pride" Released: March 12, 2021; 2. "Above It All" Released: August 13, 2021; 3. "Drop Your Guard" Released: October 22, 2021; 4. "Ignorance is Bliss" Released: May 26, 2023; 5. "Can't Look Away" Released: June 30, 2023; 6. "Bulletproof" Released: August 25, 2023; 7. "Stories (Electric)" Released: September 29, 2023; 8. "My Devices" Released: October 27, 2023; 9. "Try It First" Released: November 24, 2023; 10. "Think of You" Released: December 29, 2023; 11. "Safe Here in the Shade" Released: January 26, 2024; 12. "Halo" Released: February 23, 2024; 13. "Meant to Be" Released: April 11, 2024; 14. "When I Get Better" Released: May 3, 2024; 15. "Home" Released: May 24, 2024

The Fall is the eighth studio album by American rock band Trapt, released on May 31, 2024, via the band's own New Legacy Recordings, after being delayed twice. It is the first Trapt album to feature Shawn Sonnenschein on guitar and Mitch Moore on drums. All of the songs were released as singles prior to the album.

== Background ==
When discussing the album in 2023, frontman Chris Taylor Brown stated "the last three years have been crazy, right? And I definitely was guilty of indulging my feelings of revenge and powerlessness," later going on to say that the album's theme is "embracing powerlessness and being humble." Many of the tracks are also about Brown's wife, Ashley Lauren.

Brown began writing tracks for the album in early 2021, with acoustic previews of "Halo," "When I Get Better," "Think of You," and "Drop Your Guard" being posted to the band's YouTube page; "Halo" was first performed in full around that same time. Guitarist Brendan Hengle, who performed on the three tracks released in 2021, quit the band later that same year, being replaced by Shawn Sonnenschein.

Unlike the band's previous releases, which have been recorded in traditional recording studios, The Fall was recorded at each members' home studios. The band produced it themselves, much like their prior two releases, and the bassist, Pete Charell, was in charge of mixing it. All of the cover artwork for the album and singles were generated with AI.

== Release ==
Professional ratings
Review scores
| Source | Rating |
|---|---|
| Diazable | 3/10 |
| Melodic | 1/5 stars |
| Sputnikmusic | 1/5 stars |

The album's first three singles, "Pride," "Above It All," and "Drop Your Guard" were released in 2021. Starting in May 2023, the band began releasing new singles on the last Friday of each month, beginning with "Ignorance Is Bliss." The band released two 5-track teaser EPs in November 2023 and May 2024 respectively. The album was originally set to release at the end of 2023, before being pushed to March 29, 2024, and again to May 31, 2024.

The Fall failed to make it onto any US Billboard charts. The amount of copies sold has yet to be made public.

=== Reception ===
Pre-release

In December 2023, Exclaim! placed the cover art for "Ignorance is Bliss" at no. 6 on their "25 Worst Album Covers of 2023."

Critical response

Not many publications reviewed The Fall at release, but the ones that did, did not review it favorably, with Sputnikmusic staff member Shamus giving it 1 out of 5 stars. Nick Anastasia of Melodic also gave it 1 out of 5 stars, saying the album "not only suffers from amateur & sludging production, but the songwriting does the band absolutely no favors either," while also stating ""Try It First" shows a tiny glimmer of what the band once was, while "Home" even has some nice moments in it, despite the song feeling incomplete somehow." A reviewer for Diazable gave the album a 3/10, noting how some songs "drag on endlessly," riffs are "clumsy and disjointed," and that the album "is just further proof of how far they've fallen from their former glory," although tracks such as "Home" and "Can't Look Away" "manage to sound somewhat passable."

Dave Franklin of The Big Takeover was more favorable, saying "if The Fall is anything to go by, that music is more mature, more experimental, more interesting, and more exciting, unguided by the fickle winds of fad and fashion that may once have weighed them down. Ironically, The Fall sees the band rising to the top of their game."

=== Touring ===
To promote the album, the band embarked on The Fall Tour, which took place from August 2023 to November 2024, featuring several opening bands across three legs, such as Smile Empty Soul. In May 2024, the band joined Josey Scott (formerly of Saliva) on the Parental Advisory Tour, alongside Adema, Tantric, and One Day Alive.

== Track listing ==
All tracks are written by Chris Taylor Brown; "Stories" written by Brown, Simon Ormandy, and Pete Charell.

The Fall physical track listing
| No. | Title | Length |
|---|---|---|
| 1. | "Meant to Be" | 4:12 |
| 2. | "Try It First" | 3:36 |
| 3. | "Halo" | 3:12 |
| 4. | "Think of You" | 4:13 |
| 5. | "Bulletproof" | 3:11 |
| 6. | "Home" | 3:29 |
| 7. | "My Devices" | 3:23 |
| 8. | "Above It All" | 3:28 |
| 9. | "Safe Here in the Shade" | 3:00 |
| 10. | "Drop Your Guard" | 4:46 |
| 11. | "When I Get Better" | 3:12 |
| 12. | "Ignorance is Bliss" | 2:51 |
| 13. | "Can't Look Away" | 3:46 |
| 14. | "Stories" (Electric) | 4:02 |
| 15. | "Pride" | 4:09 |
| Total length: | | 54:35 |

The Fall digital track listing
| No. | Title | Length |
|---|---|---|
| 1. | "Try It First" | 3:36 |
| 2. | "Meant to Be" | 4:12 |
| 3. | "Think of You" | 4:13 |
| 4. | "Home" | 3:29 |
| 5. | "Drop Your Guard" | 4:46 |
| 6. | "Halo" | 3:12 |
| 7. | "Safe Here in the Shade" | 3:00 |
| 8. | "My Devices" | 3:23 |
| 9. | "Bulletproof" | 3:11 |
| 10. | "Above It All" | 3:28 |
| 11. | "When I Get Better" | 3:12 |
| 12. | "Ignorance is Bliss" | 2:51 |
| 13. | "Can't Look Away" | 3:46 |
| 14. | "Pride" | 4:09 |
| 15. | "Stories" (Electric) | 4:02 |
| Total length: | | 54:35 |

Notes

- "Stories" was excluded from the vinyl release.
- The digital edition was marketed as a deluxe edition, despite having the same number of tracks as the physical release.

== Personnel ==
=== Trapt ===
- Chris Taylor Brown – vocals, acoustic and rhythm guitars, keys and synths
- Pete Charell – bass guitar
- Shawn Sonnenschein – lead guitar (Note: All tracks except "Above It All," "Drop Your Guard," "Pride")
- Mitch Moore – drums

=== Additional musicians ===
- Brendan Hengle – lead guitar (Note: "Above It All," "Drop Your Guard," "Pride;" uncredited)

=== Production ===
- Trapt – producers
- Pete Charell – mixing
- Maor Appelbaum – mastering at DNA
