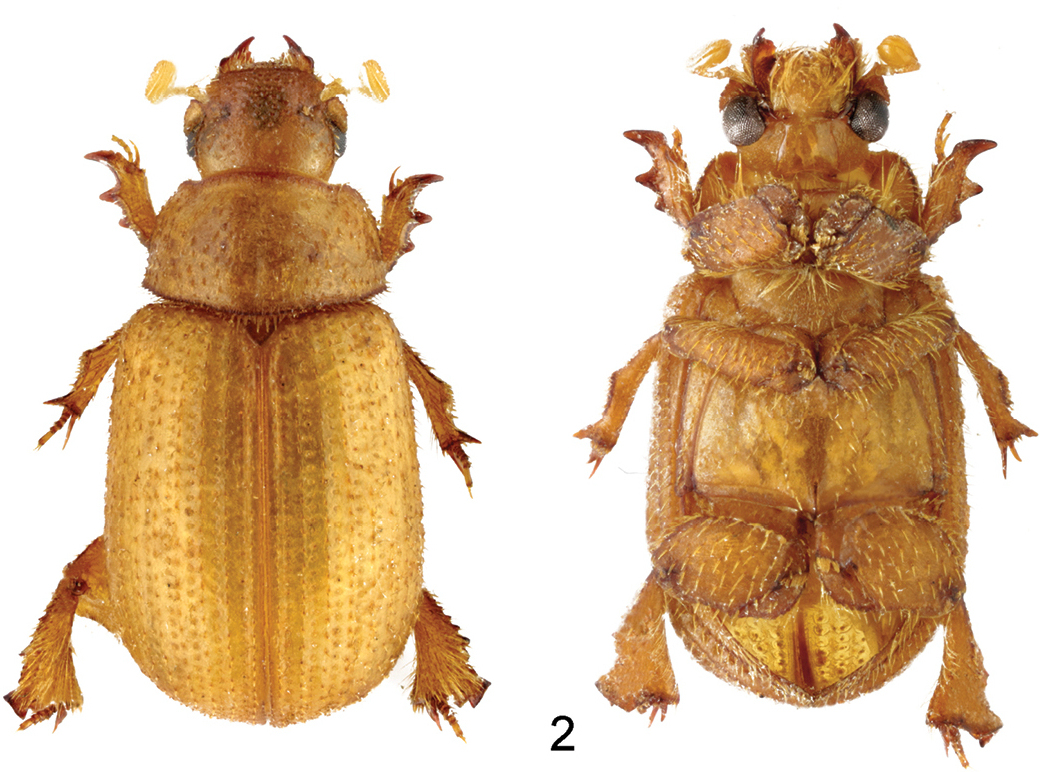
- Glaresis hespericula

Scientific classification
- Kingdom: Animalia
- Phylum: Arthropoda
- Class: Insecta
- Order: Coleoptera
- Suborder: Polyphaga
- Infraorder: Scarabaeiformia
- Superfamily: Scarabaeoidea
- Family: Glaresidae; Kolbe, 1905
- Genus: Glaresis; Erichson, 1848

Type species
- Glaresis rufa Erichson, 1848

Species
- >80; see text

= Glaresis =

Glaresis Temporal range: Aptian–Recent

Genus of beetles

Glaresis is a genus of beetles, sometimes called "enigmatic scarab beetles", in its own family, Glaresidae. It is closely related to, and was formerly included in, the family Scarabaeidae. Although its members occur in arid and sandy areas worldwide (except Australia), only the nocturnal adults have ever been collected (typically at lights), and both the larvae and biology of Glaresis are as yet unknown. Due to their narrow habitat associations, a great number of these species occur in extremely limited geographic areas, and are accordingly imperiled by habitat destruction.

These beetles are small, 2.5–6 mm long, and have the stocky appearance typical of fossorial scarabs, with short, heavy, spurred legs. Color ranges from tan to dark brown, and the back is covered with short setae.

Efforts to raise glaresids in the laboratory were undertaken in the 1980s by C. H. Scholtz and others, but were unsuccessful.

Glaresis was originally classified with Trogidae (originally a subfamily within Scarabaeidae), and has many characteristics of "primitive" scarabaeoids, but no affinities to any of the other primitive groups; recent work suggests that they may in fact belong in Trogidae. Scholtz argued that Glaresis is the most primitive type of scarabaeoid, but more recent research indicates that the Pleocomidae hold this position. The species in North, Central, and South America have been revised by Robert Gordon and Guy Hanley, January 2014, in the journal Insecta Mundi.

== Species ==
- Glaresis alfierii
- Glaresis arabica
- Glaresis arenata
- Glaresis australis
- Glaresis bajaensis
- Glaresis bautista
- Glaresis beckeri
- Glaresis caenulenta
- Glaresis california
- Glaresis canadensis
- Glaresis carthagensis
- Glaresis cartwrighti
- Glaresis ceballosi
- Glaresis celiae
- Glaresis clypeata
- Glaresis confusa
- Glaresis contrerasi
- Glaresis costaricensis
- Glaresis costata
- Glaresis dakotensis
- Glaresis dentata
- Glaresis desperata
- Glaresis donaldi
- Glaresis ecostata
- Glaresis exasperata
- Glaresis falli
- Glaresis foveolata
- Glaresis franzi
- Glaresis freyi
- Glaresis fritzi
- Glaresis frustrata
- Glaresis gineri
- Glaresis gordoni
- Glaresis handlirschi
- Glaresis hespericula
- Glaresis hispana
- Glaresis holmi
- Glaresis holzschuhi
- Glaresis howdeni
- Glaresis imitator
- Glaresis impressicollis
- Glaresis inducta
- Glaresis kocheri
- Glaresis koenigsbaueri
- Glaresis limbata
- Glaresis lomii
- Glaresis longisternum
- Glaresis mandibularis
- Glaresis maroccana
- Glaresis mauritanica
- Glaresis medialis
- Glaresis mendica
- Glaresis methneri
- Glaresis minuta
- Glaresis mondacai
- Glaresis montenegro
- Glaresis namibensis
- Glaresis obscura
- Glaresis ordosensis
- Glaresis orientalis
- Glaresis oxiana
- Glaresis paramendica
- Glaresis pardoalcaidei
- Glaresis pardoi
- Glaresis penrithae
- Glaresis phoenicis
- Glaresis porrecta
- Glaresis quedenfeldti
- Glaresis rufa
- Glaresis smithi
- Glaresis subulosa
- Glaresis texana
- Glaresis thiniensis
- Glaresis tripolitana
- Glaresis tumida
- Glaresis villiersi
- Glaresis walzlae
- Glaresis warneri
- Glaresis yanegai
- Glaresis zacateca
- Glaresis zarudniana
- Glaresis zvirgzdinsi

=== Fossil species ===
- †Glaresis burmitica Cai and Huang 2018 Burmese amber, Myanmar, Cenomanian
- †Glaresis orthochilus Bai et al. 2010 Yixian Formation, China, Aptian
- †Glaresis tridentata Bai et al. 2014 Yixian Formation, China, Aptian

"Glaresis" cretacea Nikolajev 2007 from the Aptian aged Zaza Formation in Russia is considered questionable, with Cai and Huang 2018 considering it to have no diagnostic characters of the family.
