= Still Frame =

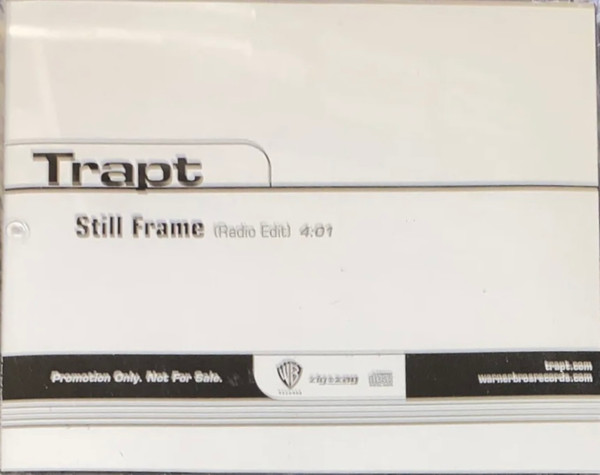

Single by Trapt

from the album Trapt
- A-side: "Headstrong"
- Released: May 20, 2003
- Recorded: 2001
- Genre: Nu metal; pop metal
- Length: 4:31 (album version); 4:01 (radio edit)
- Label: Warner Bros.; Zig Zag
- Composers: Chris Taylor Brown; Pete Charell; Simon Ormandy
- Lyricist: Chris Taylor Brown
- Producers: GGGarth; Trapt

Trapt singles chronology
"Headstrong" (2002)	"Still Frame" (2003)	"Echo" (2004)

Music video
- "Still Frame" on YouTube

"Still Frame" is the second single from American rock band Trapt's debut album Trapt. Released on May 20, 2003, it was a hit on rock radio stations and reached No. 1 on the Billboard Hot Mainstream Rock Tracks chart.

== Charts ==
Chart (2003)	Peak position
US Billboard Hot 100	69
US Mainstream Rock (Billboard)	1
US Radio Songs (Billboard)	67
