= Trapt =

American rock band

- Trapt performing live in 2026. From left to right: Shawn Sonnenschein, Mitch Moore, Chris Taylor Brown, and Pete Charell

Background information
- Origin: Los Gatos, California, U.S.
- Genres: Hard rock; post-grunge; nu metal; alternative rock; alternative metal
- Years active: 1995–present
- Labels: Warner Bros.; Zig Zag; Eleven Seven; Cleopatra; Epochal Artists; EMI; Crash Collide; The End; ADA; New Legacy
- Members: Chris Taylor Brown; Pete Charell; Shawn Sonnenschein; Mitch Moore
- Past members: See members section
- Website: trapt.com

Trapt is an American rock band formed in Los Gatos, California. Since 2021, their lineup has consisted of Chris Taylor Brown (vocals and guitar), Pete Charell (bass), Shawn Sonnenschein (guitar), and Mitch Moore (drums). Nine studio albums have been recorded to date: Trapt (2002), Someone in Control (2005), Only Through the Pain (2008), No Apologies (2010), Reborn (2013), DNA (2016), Shadow Work (2020), The Fall (2024), and Resurrection (2026).

Trapt's biggest commercial success was their eponymous major-label debut, which became certified platinum by 2003 and included the hit single "Headstrong", which became a crossover hit to the pop charts and peaked at number 16 on the Billboard Hot 100. Though their subsequent releases did not match the pop appeal of "Headstrong", the band was able to maintain a presence in the rock market throughout the decade. The band has sold over 2.5 million records worldwide.

== History ==
=== Formation and early years (1995–2000) ===
The members of Trapt met in middle school in the mid-'90s, and were in an early NOFX cover band called the Swinging Udders, with Manny Terres on guitar and Aaron Azlant on lead vocals. Shortly thereafter, the band reformed and developed an act with Chris Taylor Brown (lead vocals), Simon Ormandy (guitar), Rick Sanders (guitar), Pete Charell (bass), and David Stege (drums). Originally, the band were rapcore. The band's first few rehearsals were in Ormandy's guesthouse, which had a party-like atmosphere with its loft overlooking the living room. They began playing at local venues in 1997 before any members had graduated high school. In 1998, still before graduation, they were already opening for up-and-coming fellow acts like Papa Roach. They recorded and released their first CD, Amalgamation, in 1999, which they sold at their live shows. Sanders departed from the band afterwards, but the band opted to remain a quartet instead of recruiting an additional guitarist. Drummer Stege also left the band not longer after. He was replaced by Robin Diaz, and in 2000 the band released the EP Glimpse.

=== Warner Bros. and Eleven Seven years (2001–2011) ===
By 2001, the band began looking for a record deal. The band were set to sign with Immortal Records, however after disagreements relating to creative control, the deal fell through and the band ultimately signed with Warner Bros. Records, and started recording their debut album with producer Garth Richardson. During recording however, Diaz was simultaneously in Trapt, Closure, and Theory of a Deadman, but he ultimately chose to stay in the latter two bands; thus, his place in Trapt was filled by Aaron Montgomery. On November 5, 2002, the band released their major label debut album, Trapt, which was certified platinum by the RIAA on November 24, 2003. The album produced a total of three charting singles: "Headstrong", "Still Frame", and "Echo", with "Headstrong" as the most successful of the three.

Before releasing their next full-length album, the band released a self-titled three-track EP, released March 30, 2004, that included live versions of the "Made of Glass" and "Echo" tracks from their debut album, as well as a previously unreleased non-LP track, "Promise". Their second full-length album, titled Someone in Control, was released September 13, 2005. It produced three singles for the band: "Stand Up", "Waiting", and "Disconnected (Out of Touch)". While it reached #14 on the US Billboard 200, the album didn't meet Warner's expectations, selling 500,000 copies. Disappointed, Warner stopped responding to the band. Brown said of the situation: "We didn't like the situation. We asked them to let us off the label. There was no official parting of the ways; we just said, 'We're leaving', and there was no response, so we were out of there." The band signed to Eleven Seven the following year.

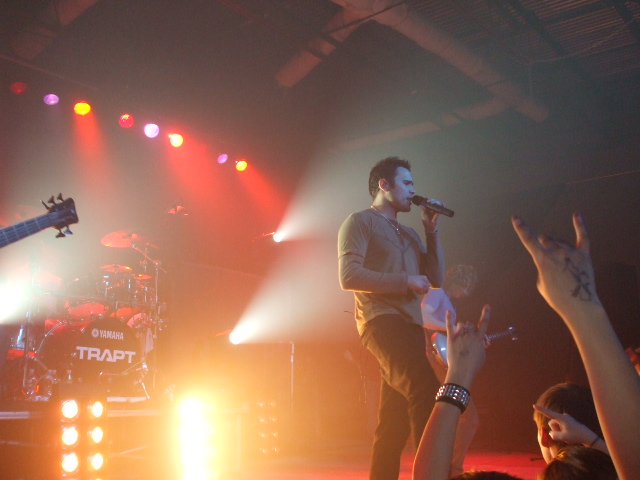
Trapt vocalist Chris Taylor Brown live in Abilene, Texas in 2007

Their first live album, titled Trapt Live!, was released on September 18, 2007. The album featured two new studio songs, "Stay Alive" and "Everything to Lose", as well as live versions of nine songs from their earlier records. On March 7, 2008, it was announced that lead guitarist Simon Ormandy had parted ways with the band. He was replaced by Robb Torres. Despite rumors indicating otherwise, Ormandy's departure was amicable, and Brown continued to speak highly of Ormandy to the media, while promoting Torres as the new guitarist. A day later on June, Trapt released the single "Who's Going Home with You Tonight?", the lead single from their then-upcoming studio album entitled Only Through the Pain, which released on August 5. A music video for the song was released that same day, premiering exclusively on Xbox Live. That summer, Trapt toured as part of Mötley Crüe's Crüe Fest along with Buckcherry, Papa Roach and Sixx:A.M. The tour began July 1, 2008 in West Palm Beach, Florida, and wrapped up in Burgettstown, Pennsylvania on August 31. In 2009, the band released "Contagious" as the second single from the album, and embarked on the "Contagious" tour early that year.

In March 2010, Trapt said they were wrapping up the recording process of their new record with producer Johnny K. No Apologies was released on October 12, 2010. The first single, "Sound Off", was available on iTunes on July 20, 2010. Another song, "Stranger in the Mirror", was released for free from the band's Facebook page August 11, 2010. The band left Eleven Seven shortly after the release. In 2011, the band released the compilation album Headstrong under Cleopatra Records, with which they re-recorded 7 tracks from their self-titled, as well as releasing a new track, "Policy of Truth".

=== Independent years and lineup changes (2012–present) ===
In 2011, Trapt released the single "Bring It," which would prove to be the final single with Montgomery on drums, as he would leave the band in 2012, being replaced by Dylan Howard. That same year, the band signed with Epochal Artists, and in October of that year, announced Reborn would be released on November 20, before delaying it to January 22, 2013. "Bring It" made it to the top 20 on the Active Rock Radio Charts. Shortly before the album released, Torres announced his departure from Trapt, saying "it's time to move on to a new chapter." He was replaced by Travis Miguel of Atreyu.

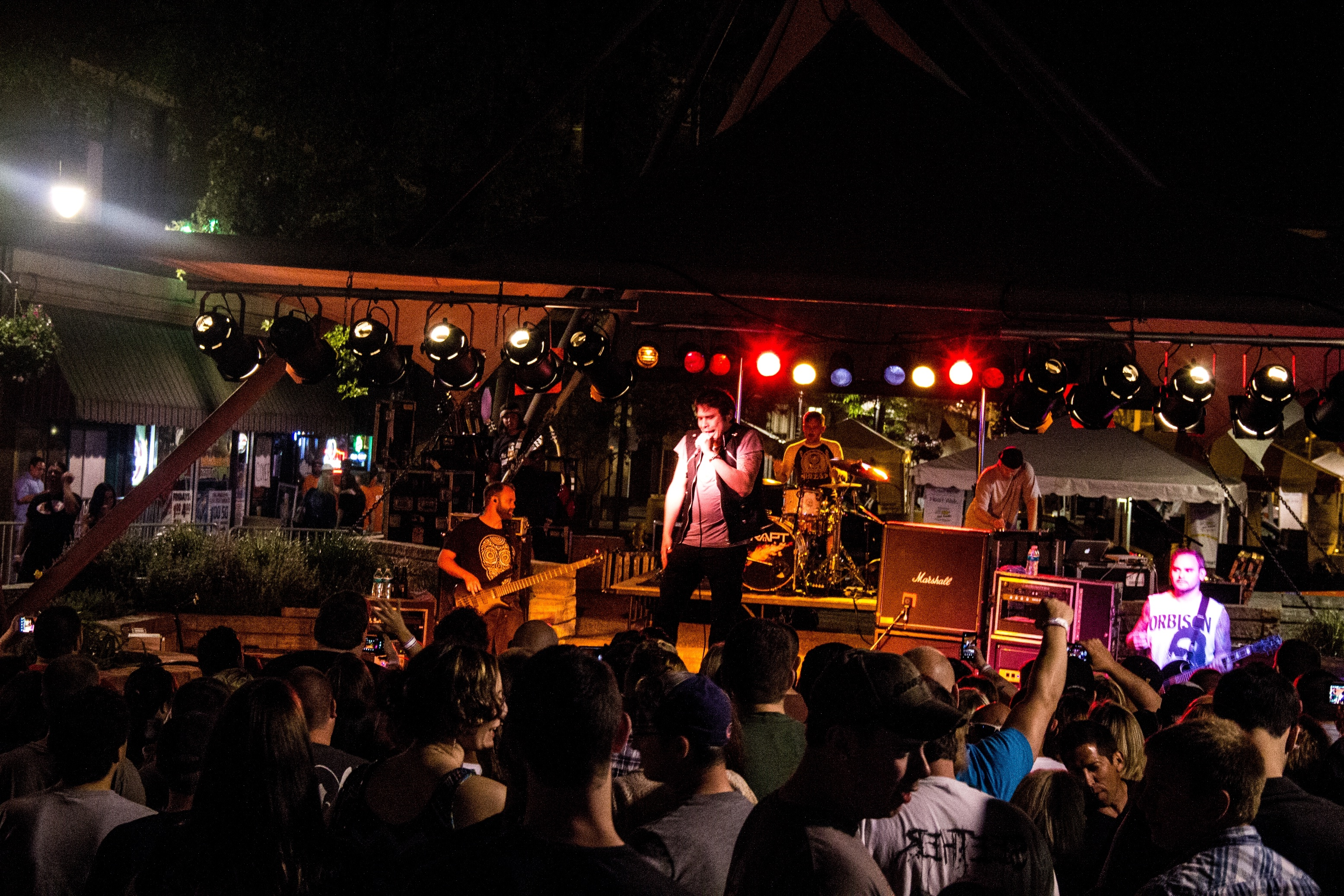
Trapt performing live in 2013. From left to right: Charell, Brown, Howard and Miguel (on the far right)

In 2014, Trapt re-released their early, out of print albums Amalgamation and Glimpse EP. and announced "The Self Titled Tour," a tour focused around their self-titled album. On June 15, Trapt launched an Indiegogo campaign to help fund their next studio album, DNA, and a collection of acoustic versions of songs called The Acoustic Collection, which came out that summer. Their $50k goal was met two weeks early. Following the end of the "Self Titled Tour," Miguel left to rejoin Atreyu, with the band recruiting Ty Fury. Before a show in Stanhope, New Jersey, on July 26, 2015, Trapt and local band Too Far Lost got into a dispute, after Trapt allegedly refused to let them use any of the venue's available tables to sell their own merchandise.

The band's sixth studio album, DNA, was released on August 19, 2016. It was the band's poorest charting album to date, debuting and peaking at number 148 on the Billboard 200 chart. Two of its singles, "Passenger" and "It's Over," were able to make it into the top 50 on the Mainstream Rock Songs chart. They also partook in the Make America Rock Again tour that year and the following year. After the 2016 Make America Rock Again run, Fury departed from Trapt, later joining Tantric. David Sudock filled in for the 2017 run, before Brendan Hengle took his place in 2018, as he was already the band's drummer starting from 2016 up until then, replacing Howard. In 2018, the band released the non-album single "Come Together" with rapper An0maly, which did not chart on any Billboard song charts. Around this time, drumming duties were being handled by both Mike Smith and Adam Prentice.

In May 2020, the band's seventh studio album, Shadow Work, was announced. It released the following July, though it failed to chart in the US Billboard 200 chart, selling only 600 copies in its first week, an 87% drop from their prior studio album, DNA, in 2016. That August, the band performed alongside Smash Mouth at the Sturgis Motorcycle Rally in South Dakota; the event was later classed as a superspreading event. In the following December, multiple outlets reported that Brown had been fired from the band, though it was debunked as a hoax hours later. On January 23, 2021, Smith announced that he had left Trapt for "primarily political" reasons. He was replaced by Mitch Moore.

In 2022, the band embarked on the "20th Anniversary Tour", where they performed the self-titled album in full. This was the first tour with Shawn Sonnenschein on guitar.

In 2023, the band announced that their eighth album, titled The Fall, would be released by the end of the year, before being delayed to March 2024, and again to May 31. They embarked on The Fall Tour throughout 2023 and 2024. Trapt were supposed to appear at the 2024 edition of Louder Than Life, but were pulled from the lineup at an unknown point, which Brown claimed was due to "virtue signaling."

In 2025, Trapt embarked on a full band acoustic tour, with dates being added throughout the year. In March 2025, the band were announced to be a part of Ill Niño & Powerman 5000's "Taste of Armageddon Tour," but were pulled from the bill the same month. Brown claimed they left the tour on their own terms because of heavy backlash. During the acoustic tour, Brown claimed four venues backed out due to "cancel culture," with which people would contact the venues to inform them of the band's controversies. In May 2025, Trapt performed at Boardwalk Rock festival in Ocean City, Maryland, their first major festival appearance in years.

On April 24, 2025, it was reported that Trapt's upcoming ninth album would be titled Resurrection. When asked about it, Brown promised the album would include "some of the heaviest Trapt songs we have done." The band debuted the song "Bandages" in concert in August, while "I Did My Time" was first performed in October. The album was officially announced in March 2026, with the band releasing three tracks; "Bend So Much," "No One Home," and "I Did My Time;" exclusively through the album's pre-order on April 10. Resurrection released physically on September 11, 2026, and on September 12, Trapt is set to embark on the "Then Til Now" tour, celebrating the 25th anniversary of the band signing a record deal, as well as the anniversary of their self-titled record. On November 6, 2026, after a show in Fort Pierce, Florida, local bands Dirty Crumbums and Fear of Infirmity accused Trapt and their tour manager of cutting their opening sets short, due to a strict bedtime policy. Both bands performed in defiance, with Trapt's staff allegedly cutting Dirty Crumbums' mics and instruments roughly 17 minutes into their set, resulting in a member's amp being blown out.

== Musical style and influences ==
Trapt's musical style has been described as post-grunge, hard rock, alternative metal, alternative rock, nu metal and heavy metal. AllMusic critic MacKenzie Wilson writes that the band "draws influences from grunge and heavy metal" while "absorbing the heavy rock sounds of Korn, Soundgarden, and Metallica". The band has cited Korn, Tool, Papa Roach, Pink Floyd, Pearl Jam and Genesis as influences.

== Social media use ==
Many publications have taken note of the band's unusual use of social media accounts, run by Brown, often to lash out and attack others, something not often done from official band accounts. Music website MetalSucks noted in 2015 that the band's official Facebook account made lengthy posts criticizing viewers of Keeping Up with the Kardashians, which devolved into the account swearing and berating commenters. The comment also included homophobic insults towards internet musician Rob Scallon, whom the band had feuded with on social media earlier in the year over the unauthorized and unattributed use of Scallon's videos. In 2017, Brown insulted commenters who disagreed with his defense of President Trump's dismissal of James Comey, and then again later in the year with critics of Brown's stance that institutional racism does not exist. Brown initially expressed regret for his comments, saying "I think the biggest thing you have to do for yourself is collect yourself and realize that you’re in a position where people are looking up to you. You do have to be the bigger person, no doubt."

In March 2020, Metal Injection, The A.V. Club, and Slate all reported that the band's Twitter account had gone on a week-long effort of arguing with and insulting people. It began with insults of civil rights activist and bishop Talbert W. Swan II and accusations of having a "victim mentality". The comments then expanded into areas such as defending the Unite the Right rally, calling people "nerds", challenging the existence of white privilege in society, supporting Trump's "Chinese virus" rhetoric in reference to the COVID-19 pandemic, and fat-shaming women. Loudwire noted that many notable bands and musicians later responded to counter or ridicule the claims. Brown later used the band account to threaten legal action against an unflattering parody account assuming Trapt's identity, but dropped the issue on the same day once the account altered its Twitter handle to make the parody clearer. In May 2020, Brown threatened legal action against multiple Change.org petitions to keep the band's music off of the upcoming Tony Hawk's Pro Skater 1 + 2 re-release, even though the band's music never appeared on the originals nor was announced for the remaster. In the same month, Brown used the band's account to partially blame George Floyd for his own death.

In August 2020, in response to an article by music publication Consequence of Sound that asserted that the band drew a small crowd size at a festival, the band took to Twitter to berate the publication and any fans who agreed with the story's claim of poor attendance. The following month, the band's account was used to publicly berate Travis Livingstone, an artist the band had commissioned, but not paid, for a lyric video for their album release that year. In October 2020, the band drew criticism when they announced their support for the far-right extremist group the Proud Boys and invited the group's Dallas, Texas, chapter to their next show in town.

In November 2020, Spin reported that Facebook had deleted Trapt's page on the grounds of hate speech. In December 2020, the band's Twitter account was suspended after Brown wrote a series of Tweets that multiple publications interpreted to be about defending statutory rape, where Brown said he would 'high five' a hypothetical 15-year-old boy who had sex with a 25-year-old female teacher. In April 2021, Brown defended and clarified his stance, saying it was not meant as a defense of statutory rape, but rather, "a joke in bad taste" in relation to his thoughts on the "double standard between how men need to treat women versus the other way around".

== Awards and nominations ==
=== Billboard Music Awards ===
Year	Nominee / work	Award	Result
2003	Trapt	Rock Artist of the Year	Nominated
2003	"Headstrong"	Rock Single of the Year	Won
2003	"Headstrong"	Modern Rock Track of the Year	Won

=== Larry Awards ===
Year	Nominee / work	Award	Result
2003	"Headstrong"	Best Hard Rock Song	Won

=== Teen Choice Awards ===
Year	Nominee / work	Award	Result	Ref.
2003	"Headstrong"	Choice Rock Track	Nominated	

== Band members ==
Current members

- Chris Taylor Brown – lead vocals, rhythm guitar, synths, samples (1995–present)
- Pete Charell – bass guitar, backing vocals (1995–present)
- Shawn Sonnenschein – lead guitar (2021–present)
- Mitch Moore – drums, cajón (2021–present)

Former members

- Simon Ormandy – lead guitar (1995–2008)
- Rick Sanders – lead guitar (1995–1999)
- David Stege – drums (1995–2000)
- Robin Diaz – drums (2000–2002)
- Aaron "Monty" Montgomery – drums (2002–2012)
- Robb Torres – lead guitar (2008–2013)
- Dylan Thomas Howard – drums (2012–2016)
- Travis Miguel – lead guitar (2013–2014)
- Ty Fury – lead guitar (2014–2017)
- Brendan Hengle – drums (2016–2018); lead guitar, cajón (2018–2021)
- David Suddock – lead guitar (2017–2018)
- Mike Smith – drums (2018, 2020–2021)
- Adam Prentice – drums (2019–2020)

Timeline

== Discography ==
Studio albums

- Trapt (2002)
- Someone in Control (2005)
- Only Through the Pain (2008)
- No Apologies (2010)
- Reborn (2013)
- DNA (2016)
- Shadow Work (2020)
- The Fall (2024)
- Resurrection (2026)

== Tours ==
Headlining

- Under the Radar Tour (2003)
- Winterfresh SnoCore Tour (2004)
- Fall Tour (2005)
- Contagious Tour (2009)
- Sound Off Tour (2010)
- Fall Tour (2012)
- The Self-Titled Tour (2014)
- The "Life in Your Own Hands" Tour (2015)
- Make America Rock Again (2016)
- An Acoustic Evening with Trapt (2017)
- Australian Tour (2017, 2019)
- 20th Anniversary Tour (2022-2023)
- Full Band Acoustic Tour (2023, 2025)
- The Fall Tour (2023-2024)
- Then Til Now Tour (2026)

Co-headlining

- The Equinox Tour (2006) (with Shinedown)
- Fall Tour (2007) (with Fuel)

Opening act

- All the Right Reasons Tour (2006) (opening for Nickelback)
- Crüe Fest (2008) (opening for Mötley Crüe)
- Fall Jägermeister Music Tour (2008) (opening for Hinder)
- Monsters of Annihilation Tour (2010) (opening for Papa Roach and Skillet)
- Make America Rock Again (2017) (opening for Scott Stapp)
- Muddfest (2019) (opening for Puddle of Mudd)
- Parental Advisory Tour (2024) (opening for Josey Scott)
