= Someone in Control =

2005 studio album by Trapt

Studio album by Trapt
- Released: September 13, 2005
- Recorded: April 2004 – February 2005
- Studio: NRG Recording Studios (North Hollywood, California)
- Genres: Nu metal; post-grunge
- Length: 41:25
- Labels: Warner Bros.; Zig Zag
- Producers: Don Gilmore; Trapt

Trapt chronology
Trapt (2002)	Someone in Control (2005)	Trapt Live! (2007)

Trapt studio chronology
Trapt (2002)	Someone in Control (2005)	Only Through the Pain (2008)

Singles from Someone in Control
- 1. "Stand Up" Released: July 12, 2005; 2. "Waiting" Released: January 17, 2006; 3. "Disconnected (Out of Touch)" Released: 2006

Someone in Control is the second studio album by American rock band Trapt, released on September 13, 2005 by Warner Bros. Records.

== Release ==
The first single, "Stand Up," was released on July 12, 2005, and topped out at No. 17 on the Modern Rock Tracks chart and No. 3 on the Mainstream Rock Tracks chart. The album was released on two months later on September 13, debuting at number 14 on the Billboard 200 chart, with approximatively 61,400 copies sold in its first week. By the end of 2005, the album sold 500,000 copies. "Waiting" and "Disconnected (Out of Touch)" were released as singles in 2006.

Despite the album's moderate success, Warner Bros. was disappointed by its performance, possibly due to the lack of a hit single, and eventually stopped responding to the band. Trapt later signed to Eleven Seven Music.

== Critical reception ==
Professional ratings
Review scores
Source	Rating
AllMusic	2.5/5 stars
Blender	2/5 stars
Melodic	4/5 stars
Ultimate Guitar	7.3/10
Wise Men Promotions	4/5 stars

AllMusic's Johnny Loftus saw promise in the band's sophomore record elevating their 21st century SoCal proto-metal template with tracks like "Disconnected (Out of Touch)," "Waiting" and "Influence," saying they "succeed at constricting that sound, building some internal tension that gives Trapt some life outside their formula." Tom Beaujour of Blender found Chris Taylor Brown's vocals "overwrought" throughout the track listing and backhandedly complimented his bandmates' "preternatural command" of radio-ready nu-metal, concluding that "So even if Brown isn't exaggerating when he claims, "I'm always questioning my sanity," at least he won't have any trouble paying for a good shrink."

== Track listing ==
All lyrics are written by Chris Taylor Brown; all music is composed by Trapt.

No.	Title	Length
1.	"Disconnected (Out of Touch)"	3:47
2.	"Waiting"	3:50
3.	"Victim"	3:59
4.	"Stand Up"	3:59
5.	"Lost Realist"	4:06
6.	"Skin Deep"	3:45
7.	"Influence"	4:09
8.	"Repeat Offender"	3:16
9.	"Bleed Like Me"	3:27
10.	"Use Me to Use You"	3:29
11.	"Product of My Own Design"	3:32
Total length:		41:25

"Alibi" released as a bonus track on Walmart.com with claim code found on the inside of the compact disc.

== Personnel ==
Trapt

- Chris Taylor Brown – lead vocals, guitar
- Simon Ormandy – lead guitar
- Pete Charell – bass
- Aaron "Monty" Montgomery – drums

Additional musicians

- John O'Brien – keyboards and programming
- Bart Hendrickson – keyboards and programming (1, 5)
- Martin Tillman – cello (5)

Technical personnel

- Don Gilmore – producer, engineer
- Trapt – producers
- Fox Phelps – assistant engineer
- Daniel Mendez – Pro Tools and additional engineering
- Tom Lord-Alge – mixing
- Ted Jensen – mastering

== Chart positions ==
Album

Chart (2005)	Peak position
Canadian Albums Chart	64
US Billboard 200	14

Singles

Year	Song	US Alt.	US Main.	US Act. Rock
2005	"Stand Up"	17	3	3
2006	"Waiting"	27	20	17
2006	"Disconnected (Out Of Touch)"	—	24	22
