= Echo (Trapt song) =

Single by Trapt

from the album Trapt
- Released: January 27, 2004
- Recorded: 2001
- Genre: Pop metal; alternative rock
- Length: 4:11
- Label: Warner Bros.
- Composers: Chris Taylor Brown; Pete Charell; Simon Ormandy
- Lyricist: Chris Taylor Brown
- Producers: GGGarth; Trapt

Trapt singles chronology
"Still Frame" (2003)	"Echo" (2004)	"Stand Up" (2005)

Music video
- "Echo" on YouTube

"Echo" is the third and final single from American rock band Trapt's eponymous debut album, released on January 27, 2004.

== Music video ==
The video starts with members of the band plugging in their equipment. It then cuts to Chris Taylor Brown (singer) and a topless woman, who is lying face down, atop of a bed. The video goes back and forth between Brown and the woman lying in bed and images of the woman appearing on the bedding. Then goes into flashbacks of Brown and a girlfriend (played by Michelle Trachtenberg) having sex and having fun with friends at a party. The video comes to its end when Brown puts down his guitar mid-song and runs to find the girlfriend. As he is running, he sees more memories of her in beams of light. It ends when Brown says goodbye to her through a fence and walks away leaving her alone.

The music video was filmed in the mansion at 2218 S Harvard Blvd in Los Angeles, a location frequently used for movies, television shows, and music videos.

== Song versions ==
There are two versions to the song. One is a production edit which is commonly played and another is a full version. The production edit appears on the album and is 4:11 long (though, on some prints, the song is 4:12). The full version only appears on the single and is 4:36 long. On some album prints, however, the full version is contained. The differences between the two versions are very slight, as the only significant difference is an extended bridge in the full version.

== Chart positions ==
Chart (2004)	Peak position
Bolivia (Notimex)	2
U.S. Billboard Bubbling Under Hot 100	25
U.S. Billboard Modern Rock Tracks	10
U.S. Billboard Mainstream Rock Tracks	13
U.S. Billboard Pop Songs	27
