= Headstrong (Trapt song) =

2002 single by Trapt

- Commercial Australian artwork

Single by Trapt

from the album Trapt
- B-side: "Still Frame"
- Released: September 23, 2002
- Genre: Nu metal; alternative rock; pop metal; hard rock
- Length: 4:45 (album version); 3:54 (edit version); 3:35 (radio and video edit)
- Label: Warner Bros.; Zig Zag
- Composers: Chris Taylor Brown; Pete Charell; Simon Ormandy
- Lyricist: Chris Taylor Brown
- Producers: GGGarth; Trapt

Trapt singles chronology
"Headstrong" (2002)	"Still Frame" (2003)

Alternative cover
- Artwork used for the US promotional disc

Music video
- "Headstrong" on YouTube

"Headstrong" is the first single released by the American rock band Trapt from their 2002 debut album, Trapt. It reached No. 1 on the US Billboard Mainstream Rock Tracks and Modern Rock Tracks charts and No. 16 on the Billboard Hot 100. It crossed over to mainstream pop radio, peaking at No. 4 on the Billboard Mainstream Top 40. The song also won two Billboard Music Awards in 2003 for "Best Modern Rock Track" and "Best Rock Track".

Billboard rated "Headstrong" the No. 1 modern rock and mainstream rock song of 2003. In September 2023, for the 35th anniversary of Modern Rock Tracks (which had been renamed to Alternative Airplay), Billboard ranked the song at No. 60 on its list of the 100 most successful songs in the chart's history. In 2018, an official poll by Ultimate Guitar saw the site's users rate "Headstrong" as having the fourth-worst riff of all-time. Graham Hartmann of Metal Injection referred to the track as "Trapt's one song" and "essential divorced dad rock".

== Music video ==
A music video was produced for "Headstrong" which shows the band performing in front of a crowd. Paper and other debris are seen flying past in furious winds as the group plays in an urban nighttime setting, as well as a couple of teenagers arguing with the people they know, such as one teen getting into an argument with his father while they are in a car and the kid becomes fed up with his father's attitude and storms off as well as another teen quitting his job at a restaurant after getting pushed around by his boss; the two teens then join Trapt in the crowd. A third teen is seen walking through the crowd and eventually graffitis Trapt's logo on a wall. The video found considerable airplay on MTV2 and MMUSA upon release. The video was directed by Brian Scott Weber.

== Awards and nominations ==
=== Billboard Music Awards ===
Year	Nominee / work	Award	Result
2003	"Headstrong"	Top Rock Song	Won
2003	"Headstrong"	Modern Rock Track of the Year	Won
2003	Trapt	Top Rock Artist	Nominated

=== Larry Awards ===
Year	Nominee / work	Award	Result
2003	"Headstrong"	Best Hard Rock Song	Won

=== Teen Choice Awards ===
Year	Nominee / work	Award	Result
2003	"Headstrong"	Choice – Rock Track	Nominated

== Track listings and formats ==
- US 7-inch vinyl
1. "Headstrong" – 4:45
2. "Still Frame" – 4:31
- Australian CD single
1. "Headstrong" – 4:45
2. "Promise" – 3:36
3. "Hollowman" – 5:03

== Charts ==
=== Weekly charts ===
Chart (2003)	Peak position
Australia (ARIA)	86
UK Singles (OCC)	106
UK Rock & Metal (Official Charts)	22
US Billboard Hot 100	16
US Adult Pop Airplay (Billboard)	40
US Alternative Airplay (Billboard)	1
US Mainstream Rock (Billboard)	1
US Pop Airplay (Billboard)	4

=== Year-end charts ===
Chart (2003)	Position
US Billboard Hot 100	49
US Mainstream Rock Tracks (Billboard)	1
US Mainstream Top 40 (Billboard)	56
US Modern Rock Tracks (Billboard)	1

Chart (2004)	Position
US Mainstream Top 40 (Billboard)	50

=== Decade-end charts ===
Chart (2000–2009)	Position
US Alternative Songs (Billboard)	1
US Hot Rock Songs (Billboard)	7

== Certifications ==
Region	Certification	Certified units/sales
New Zealand (RMNZ)	Platinum	30,000^{‡}
United Kingdom (BPI)	Silver	200,000^{‡}
United States (RIAA)	Platinum	1,000,000^{*}
^{*} Sales figures based on certification alone.^{‡} Sales+streaming figures based on certification alone.

== Release history ==
Region	Date	Format(s)	Label(s)	Ref.
United States	September 23, 2002	Mainstream rock; active rock; alternative radio	Warner Bros.	
Australia	May 12, 2003	CD	Warner Bros.	
United States	June 9, 2003	Contemporary hit radio	Warner Bros.	
United Kingdom	September 1, 2003	CD	Warner Bros.	

== In popular culture ==
- "Headstrong" was included in the motocross video game MX Unleashed, and rhythm games Donkey Konga 2 and Guitar Hero: Warriors of Rock.
- "Headstrong" was used as the theme song for the WWE pay-per-view Bad Blood in 2003.
