= Trapt (album) =

Studio album by Trapt
- Released: November 5, 2002
- Studios: The Warehouse Studio, Vancouver
- Genres: Post-grunge; nu metal
- Length: 53:20
- Labels: Warner Bros.; Zig Zag
- Producers: GGGarth; Trapt; Warren Riker (add.); Anthony "Fu" Valcic (add.)

Trapt chronology
Glimpse (2000)	Trapt (2002)	Someone in Control (2005)

Singles from Trapt
- 1. "Headstrong" Released: September 23, 2002; 2. "Still Frame" Released: May 20, 2003; 3. "Echo" Released: January 27, 2004

Trapt is the debut studio album by American rock band of the same name, released on November 5, 2002 through Warner Bros. Records.

With three hit singles, the album ascended to number 42 on the Billboard 200 chart, and went on to spend more than 80 weeks inside the Billboard 200. It was certified gold by the RIAA on May 15, 2003, then platinum on November 24 of that same year, making it Trapt's most successful album to date.

== Background ==
After putting out two independent releases and performing with up and coming acts such as Papa Roach, by the year 2000, the members of Trapt had dropped out of college and moved to Los Angeles to fully pursue their music career. By late 2000, the band were already in the process of signing with Immortal Records, after Immortal executives were impressed with their performance at the Troubadour. The band wanted to choose their own producer and be granted full creative control for the album, which caused Immortal to walk away from the deal after eight weeks. In late 2001, after a 9/11 benefit show, the band was offered a deal from Warner Bros. Records, which the band signed after the label agreed to give them full creative control. When it came to deciding producers, the band chose Garth Richardson. Bassist Pete Charell said "...it was between him and Howard Benson. We chose Garth because it seemed like he was really into the music we had. It turned out he didn’t do much, what he did to get good sounds and arrangements was minor changes."

In an interview with VH1, singer Chris Taylor Brown stated the picture of a man mowing a lawn was selected as the album art to show his view of suburban life, to which he called home.

== Critical reception ==
Professional ratings
Review scores
Source	Rating
AllMusic	2.5/5 stars
IGN	9.3/10
Melodic	3.5/5 stars
Ultimate Guitar	10/10

AllMusic critic Brian O'Neill regarded the album as "as enthusiastic as it is plagiaristic," while noting "the organic feel to the disc that separates it from their more angst-ridden peers." O'Neill further wrote that the record "isn't original, per se, as much as it does a good job melding its pronounced influences more seamlessly than most; the band would get a better recommendation if the record had songs that stood out a bit more." Melodic's Pär Winberg stated that Trapt features a "softer and more pop-orientated voice that I think is great for this type of music, compared to all clones out there."

== Legacy ==
Trapt has performed the album in its entirety live across three anniversary tours; the first time in 2014 for its tenth anniversary, the second time for its 20th anniversary in 2022 and 2023, and they are currently embarking a 25th anniversary tour for the album titled "The Then Til Now Tour," which began in late 2026; the tour also marks the 25th anniversary of the band signing a record deal.

Several tracks from Trapt were re-recorded for the 2011 compilation album, Headstrong. "Stories" was re-recorded electrically for Trapt's eighth studio album, The Fall (2024).

== Track listing ==
All lyrics are written by Chris Taylor Brown; all music is composed by Brown, Pete Charell, and Simon Ormandy.

No.	Title	Length
1.	"Headstrong"	4:46
2.	"Made of Glass"	3:30
3.	"Hollowman"	5:03
4.	"These Walls"	4:06
5.	"Still Frame"	4:31
6.	"Echo"	4:12
7.	"The Game"	5:05
8.	"When All Is Said and Done"	4:16
9.	"Enigma"	4:42
10.	"Stories"	3:56
11.	"New Beginning"	9:13
Total length:		53:20

- Starting at 4:08 when "New Beginning" ends is an additional five minutes of ambient music. Constant bass and guitar notes are repeated and after about two minutes, light sounds of static and breathing can be heard. Lines of spoken gibberish are then heard for the rest of the song.

== Personnel ==
Credits adapted from the album's liner notes.

=== Trapt ===
- Chris Taylor Brown – vocals, rhythm guitar
- Simon Ormandy – lead guitar
- Pete Charell – bass guitar
- Aaron "Monty" Montgomery – drums

=== Technical personnel ===
- GGGarth – producer
- Trapt – producers
- Dean Maher – engineering
- Amber Gislason – assistant engineering
- Anthony "FU" Valcic – programming and additional production
- Warren Riker – additional production and additional engineering (track 8)
- Ben Kaplan – digital editing, additional programming
- Darryl Romphf – production coordination
- Andy Wallace – mixing
- Steve Sisco – assistant mixing
- Robin Diaz – drums (uncredited)
- Ted Jensen – mastering (Sterling Sound)

=== Imagery ===
- Larry Sultan – cover photograph
- Chris Wray-McCann – band photography
- Ted "Lover" Livingston – back cover live photo
- Lawrence Azerrad – art direction and design

== Charts ==
=== Weekly charts ===
Weekly chart performance for Trapt
Chart (2003)	Peak position
UK Rock & Metal Albums (Official Charts)	37
US Billboard 200	42
US Heatseekers Albums (Billboard)	1

=== Year-end charts ===
2003 year-end chart performance for Trapt
Chart (2003)	Position
US Billboard 200	80

2004 year-end chart performance for Trapt
Chart (2004)	Position
US Billboard 200	113

== Certifications ==
Certifications for Trapt
Region	Certification	Certified units/sales
United States (RIAA)	Platinum	1,000,000^{^}
^{^} Shipments figures based on certification alone.

== In popular culture ==
- "Headstrong" was included in numerous video games, such as the motocross game MX Unleashed, rhythm games Donkey Konga 2 and Guitar Hero: Warriors of Rock, and sports game NHL 2003.
- "Headstrong" was used as the theme song for the WWE pay-per-view Bad Blood in 2003.
- "These Walls" was included on the soundtrack for the 2003 film Grind.
