= Ted Jensen discography =

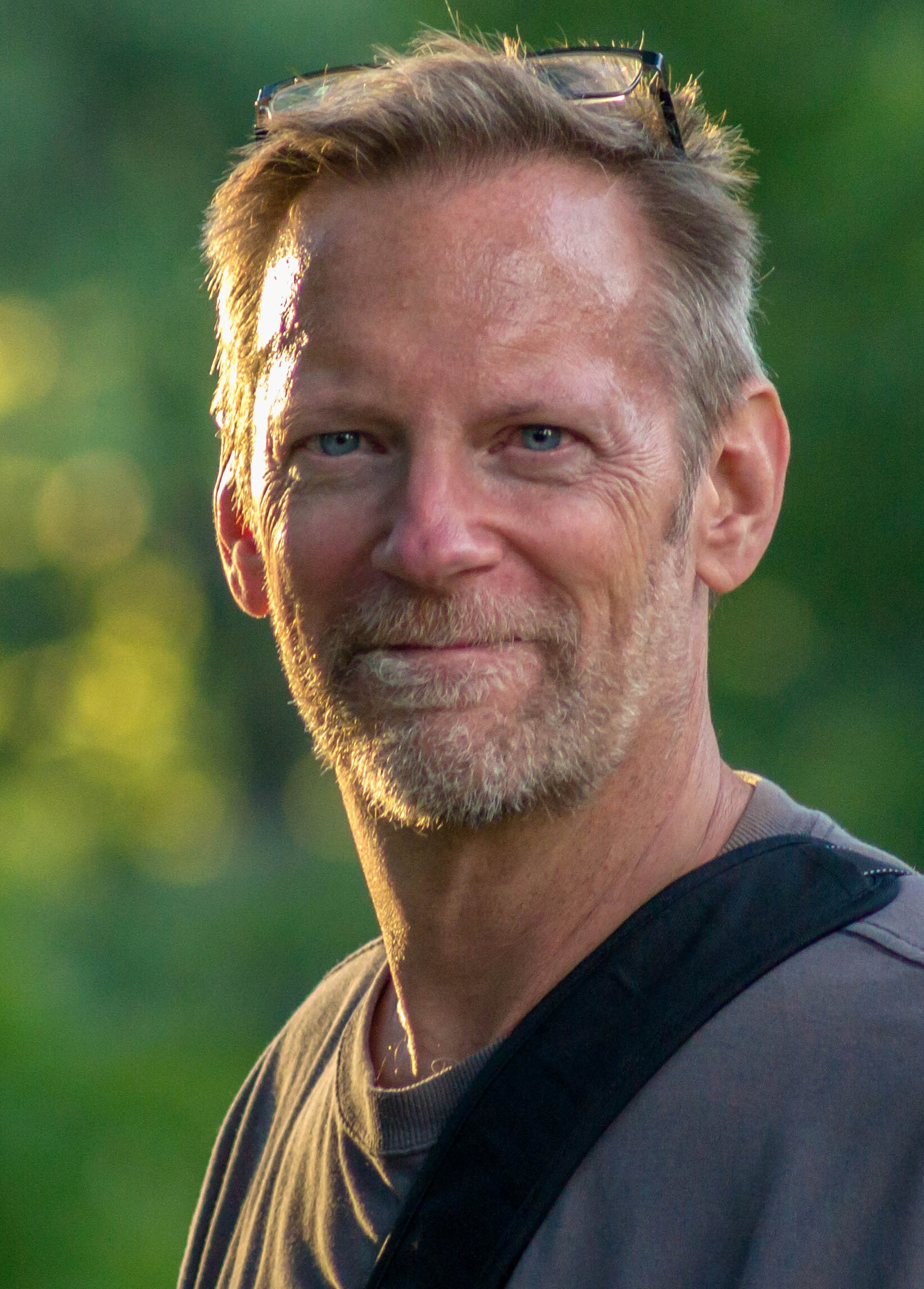
Jensen in 2013

Ted Jensen is an American mastering engineer who, among others, has mastered the Eagles' Hotel California, Green Day's American Idiot and Norah Jones' Come Away with Me.

== Selected works ==
Ted Jensen started working making tape copies at Sterling Sound in 1976. Soon after, he became an apprentice to owner Lee Hulko and mastering engineer, George Marino, taking over much of Hulko's mastering workload while Hulko focused more on management duties. In his first year at Sterling Sound, Jensen mastered the Eagles album, Hotel California and the Climax Blues Band's Gold Plated. The following year, Jensen mastered Billy Joel's The Stranger, Rod Stewart's Foot Loose & Fancy Free, Cat Stevens' Izitso and Bob Marley & The Wailers' Exodus. In the last 45 years, Ted Jensen has mastered thousands of albums for thousands of pop and rock artists.

=== 1970s–1980s ===
- 1976 Gold Plated – Climax Blues Band
- 1976 Happy Being Lonely – The Chi-Lites
- 1976 Hotel California – Eagles
- 1976 Majesty Music – Miroslav Vitouš
- 1976 Renaissance – Lonnie Liston Smith and the Cosmic Echoes
- 1976 Underwater Electronic Orchestra – Jean-Yves Labat
- 1977 A Fantasy Love Affair – Peter Brown
- 1977 Exodus – Bob Marley and the Wailers
- 1977 Fandango – Fandango
- 1977 Foot Loose & Fancy Free – Rod Stewart
- 1977 I Came to Dance – Nils Lofgren
- 1977 I Robot – The Alan Parsons Project
- 1977 Izitso – Cat Stevens
- 1977 One of a Kind – Dave Grusin
- 1977 Rhapsody in Blue – Walter Murphy
- 1977 Songwriter – Justin Hayward
- 1977 Stage Pass – Michael Stanley Band
- 1977 The Hardness of the World – Slave
- 1977 The Stranger – Billy Joel
- 1977 What a Wonderful World – Johnny Nash
- 1977 Young Loud and Snotty – The Dead Boys
- 1978 52nd Street – Billy Joel
- 1978 Angie – Angela Bofill
- 1978 Babylon by Bus – Bob Marley and the Wailers
- 1978 But Seriously, Folks... – Joe Walsh
- 1978 Cecil Taylor Unit – Cecil Taylor
- 1978 Deadlines – Strawbs
- 1978 Get Out – Foxy
- 1978 Heaven Help the Fool – Bob Weir
- 1978 Hot Streets – Chicago
- 1978 Kaya – Bob Marley and the Wailers
- 1978 Legends – Dave Valentin
- 1978 Live: Take No Prisoners – Lou Reed
- 1978 Live at Carnegie Hall: 40th Anniversary Concert – Benny Goodman
- 1978 Octave – The Moody Blues
- 1978 Pieces of Eight – Styx
- 1978 Ross – Diana Ross
- 1978 Some Girls – The Rolling Stones
- 1978 Street Hassle – Lou Reed
- 1978 Shakedown Street – Grateful Dead
- 1978 The Best of Joe Walsh – Joe Walsh
- 1978 Urban Desire – Genya Ravan
- 1978 You Ain't No Friend of Mine! – Idris Muhammad
- 1979 Carolyne Mas – Carolyne Mas
- 1979 Chicago 13 – Chicago
- 1979 Cornerstone – Styx
- 1979 Mountain Dance – Dave Grusin
- 1979 Partners in Crime – Rupert Holmes
- 1979 Rogue Waves – Terry Reid
- 1979 Survival – Bob Marley and the Wailers
- 1979 The B-52's – The B-52's
- 1979 The Bells – Lou Reed
- 1979 The Long Run – Eagles
- 1979 Three Works for Jazz Soloists and Symphony Orchestra – Don Sebesky
- 1979 What Cha' Gonna Do with My Lovin' – Stephanie Mills
- 1980 Clues – Robert Palmer
- 1980 Eagles Live – Eagles
- 1980 Emotional Rescue – The Rolling Stones
- 1980 Empty Glass – Pete Townshend
- 1980 Face to Face – Rick Derringer
- 1980 Glass Houses – Billy Joel
- 1980 One-Trick Pony – Paul Simon
- 1980 Uprising – Bob Marley and the Wailers
- 1980 Warm Leatherette – Grace Jones
- 1980 White Music – Crack the Sky
- 1980 Winelight – Grover Washington Jr.
- 1981 'Nard – Bernard Wright
- 1981 Dirty Deeds Done Dirt Cheap – AC/DC
- 1981 Face Dances – The Who
- 1981 Get Wet – Get Wet
- 1981 Ghost in the Machine – The Police
- 1981 Metal Priestess – Plasmatics
- 1981 Music from "The Elder" – Kiss
- 1981 Nightclubbing – Grace Jones
- 1981 Paradise Theater – Styx
- 1981 Songs in the Attic – Billy Joel
- 1981 Why Do Fools Fall in Love – Diana Ross
- 1982 All the Best Cowboys Have Chinese Eyes – Pete Townshend
- 1982 Bill Wyman – Bill Wyman
- 1982 Cardiac Party – Jack Mack & The Heart Attack
- 1982 Don Blackman – Don Blackman
- 1982 Living My Life - Grace Jones
- 1982 Out of the Shadows – Dave Grusin
- 1982 Records – Foreigner
- 1982 Shangó – Santana
- 1982 Sheffield Steel – Joe Cocker
- 1982 Silk Electric Diana Ross
- 1982 The Nylon Curtain – Billy Joel
- 1983 An Innocent Man – Billy Joel
- 1983 Clics modernos – Charly García
- 1983 "Weird Al" Yankovic – "Weird Al" Yankovic
- 1983 Confrontation – Bob Marley and the Wailers
- 1983 Kilroy Was Here – Styx
- 1983 Love Over and Over - Kate McGarrigle & Anna McGarrigle
- 1983 Madonna – Madonna
- 1983 Night Lines – Dave Grusin
- 1983 Speaking in Tongues – Talking Heads
- 1983 Sports Huey Lewis and the News
- 1983 Such Is Love – Peter, Paul and Mary
- 1983 Whammy! – The B-52's
- 1983 You Bought It – You Name It – Joe Walsh
- 1984 20/20 – George Benson
- 1984 Agent Provocateur - Foreigner
- 1984 Caught in the Act – Styx
- 1984 Christine McVie – Christine McVie
- 1984 Dave Grusin and the NY-LA Dream Band – Dave Grusin
- 1984 Desert Moon – Dennis DeYoung
- 1984 Earth Crisis – Steel Pulse
- 1984 Home Again – Judy Collins
- 1984 Legend – Bob Marley and the Wailers
- 1984 Stop Making Sense – Talking Heads
- 1984 Swept Away – Diana Ross
- 1984 Valotte – Julian Lennon
- 1985 20/20 – George Benson
- 1985 Deedles – Diane Schuur
- 1985 Gettin' Away with Murder – Patti Austin
- 1985 Invasion of Your Privacy – Ratt
- 1985 Lyle Mays – Lyle Mays
- 1985 Spoiled Girl - Carly Simon
- 1985 That's Why I'm Here – James Taylor
- 1986 Back in the High Life – Steve Winwood
- 1986 Beyond the Pale – Fiona
- 1986 City Slicker – James Young
- 1986 Desire Caught by the Tail – Adrian Belew
- 1986 Fame and Fortune – Bad Company
- 1986 Fore! – Huey Lewis and the News
- 1986 Powerplay - Billy Cobham
- 1986 Rebel Music – Bob Marley and the Wailers
- 1986 The Big Picture – Michael W. Smith
- 1986 The Bridge – Billy Joel
- 1986 The Secret Value of Daydreaming – Julian Lennon
- 1986 Third Degree – Johnny Winter
- 1986 True Blue – Madonna
- 1987 Cinemagic – Dave Grusin
- 1987 Coming Around Again – Carly Simon
- 1987 Crazy Nights – Kiss
- 1987 Grappelli Plays Jerome Kern – Stéphane Grappelli
- 1987 Inside Information – Foreigner
- 1987 Kohuept – Billy Joel
- 1987 Love Is for Suckers – Twisted Sister
- 1987 Men and Women – Simply Red
- 1987 No Pain for Cakes – The Lounge Lizards
- 1987 Picture This – Billy Cobham
- 1987 Pleased to Meet Me – The Replacements
- 1987 Trust Your Heart – Judy Collins
- 1988 Knock Dem Dead – Arrow
- 1988 Peter & The Wolf / Carnival Of The Animals – Part II – "Weird Al" Yankovic, Wendy Carlos
- 1989 O'La Soca – Arrow
- 1990 Soca Dance Party – Arrow
- 1988 Big Thing – Duran Duran
- 1988 CK – Chaka Khan
- 1988 Ivory Coast – Bob James
- 1988 Live at the Blue Note – Dave Valentin
- 1988 My Guitar Wants to Kill Your Mama – Dweezil Zappa
- 1988 No Easy Walk to Freedom – Peter, Paul and Mary
- 1988 Roll with It – Steve Winwood
- 1988 State of Emergency – Steel Pulse
- 1988 The Carrack Collection – Paul Carrack
- 1988 Underneath the Radar – Underworld
- 1989 Heart Like a Gun – Fiona
- 1989 Journeyman – Eric Clapton
- 1989 Powerful Stuff – The Fabulous Thunderbirds
- 1989 Save Yourself – McAuley Schenker Group
- 1989 Steel Wheels – The Rolling Stones
- 1989 Storm Front – Billy Joel
- 1989 Trouble Walkin' - Ace Frehley
- 1989 Waiting for Spring – David Benoit

=== 1990s–2000s ===
- 1990 Cherry Pie – Warrant
- 1990 Edge of the Century – Styx
- 1990 Fast Forward – Spyro Gyra
- 1990 Feeding Frenzy: Jimmy Buffett Live! – Jimmy Buffett
- 1990 Filosofía Barata y Zapatos de Goma – Charly García
- 1990 Grand Piano Canyon – Bob James
- 1990 Have You Seen Me Lately – Carly Simon
- 1990 Hearts and Flowers – Joan Armatrading
- 1990 Liberty – Duran Duran
- 1990 Light Struck – Dave Valentin
- 1990 Reference Point – Acoustic Alchemy
- 1990 Refugees of the Heart - Steve Winwood
- 1990 The Earth, a Small Man, His Dog and a Chicken – REO Speedwagon
- 1990 The Immaculate Collection – Madonna
- 1991 Back on the Case – Acoustic Alchemy
- 1991 Backlash – Bad English
- 1991 Dark Sneak Love Action – Tom Tom Club
- 1991 LaTour – LaTour
- 1991 Live at the Apollo – B.B. King
- 1991 Live at the Hollywood Palladium, December 15, 1988 – Keith Richards and the X-Pensive Winos
- 1991 Music for the People – Marky Mark and the Funky Bunch
- 1991 Mental Jewelry – Live
- 1991 Musical Portraits – Dave Valentin
- 1991 Pocket Full of Kryptonite – Spin Doctors
- 1991 Pure Schuur – Diane Schuur
- 1991 Real Life – Simple Minds
- 1991 Road Apples – The Tragically Hip
- 1991 Talkin' Blues – Bob Marley and the Wailers
- 1991 The Prodigal Stranger – Procol Harum
- 1991 Unusual Heat – Foreigner
- 1991 Walk That Walk, Talk That Talk – The Fabulous Thunderbirds
- 1991 Word of Mouth – Mike + The Mechanics
- 1992 Doo-Bop – Miles Davis
- 1992 Early Alchemy – Acoustic Alchemy
- 1992 Erotica – Madonna
- 1992 Fictionary – Lyle Mays
- 1992 Flowers and Stones – Peter, Paul and Mary
- 1992 GRP All-Star Big Band – GRP All-Star Big Band
- 1992 Homebelly Groove...Live – Spin Doctors
- 1992 Images and Words – Dream Theater
- 1992 Secret Story – Pat Metheny
- 1992 Songs for a Dying Planet – Joe Walsh
- 1992 Soul of a New Machine – Fear Factory
- 1992 Strange Weather – Glenn Frey
- 1992 Unplugged – Eric Clapton *Grammy Winner Album of the Year
- 1992 Serú '92 - Serú Girán
- 1993 Blink of an Eye – Michael McDonald
- 1993 Duets – Frank Sinatra
- 1993 Harbor Lights – Bruce Hornsby
- 1993 Live at the Marquee – Dream Theater
- 1993 Memorial Beach – A-ha
- 1993 Mexican Moon – Concrete Blonde
- 1993 No Cure for Cancer – Denis Leary
- 1993 Peter, Paul & Mommy, Too – Peter, Paul and Mary
- 1993 River of Dreams – Billy Joel
- 1993 Romulus Hunt: A Family Opera – Carly Simon
- 1993 The Rainy Season – Marc Cohn
- 1993 The Road to You – Pat Metheny
- 1993 What You Hear Is What You Get: The Best of Bad Company – Bad Company
- 1994 10 on Broadway – Dennis DeYoung
- 1994 Awake – Dream Theater
- 1994 Duets II – Frank Sinatra
- 1994 Excuses for Bad Begavior (Part One) – Sandra Bernhard
- 1994 Far Beyond Driven – Pantera
- 1994 Freak City Soundtrack – Material Issue
- 1994 From the Cradle – Eric Clapton
- 1994 Fruitcakes – Jimmy Buffett
- 1994 Going Back Home – Ginger Baker
- 1994 Groove On – Gerald Levert
- 1994 Hell Freezes Over – Eagles
- 1994 Naveed – Our Lady Peace
- 1994 Night Music – Joe Jackson
- 1994 Letters Never Sent – Carly Simon
- 1994 The Mind's Eye – Stiltskin
- 1994 Throwing Copper – Live
- 1994 To the Bone – The Kinks
- 1994 Turn It Upside Down – Spin Doctors
- 1994 Under the Table and Dreaming – Dave Matthews Band
- 1995 A Boy Named Goo – Goo Goo Dolls
- 1995 A Change of Seasons – Dream Theater
- 1995 Adrenaline – Deftones
- 1995 Astro-Creep: 2000 – Songs of Love, Destruction and Other Synthetic Delusions of the Electric Head – White Zombie
- 1995 Barometer Soup – Jimmy Buffett
- 1995 Damaged Goods – Nils Lofgren
- 1995 Demanufacture – Fear Factory
- 1995 Frogstomp – Silverchair
- 1995 It's Great When You're Straight...Yeah – Black Grape
- 1995 Life Begins at 40 Million – The Bogmen
- 1995 Love and Other Obsessions – Spyro Gyra
- 1995 Mint 400 – Ammonia
- 1995 Mr. Moonlight – Foreigner
- 1995 Naked Songs – Live and Acoustic – Rickie Lee Jones
- 1995 Natural Mystic: The Legend Lives On – Bob Marley and the Wailers
- 1995 One Clear Voice – Peter Cetera
- 1995 Plumb – Jonatha Brooke and The Story
- 1995 Sinatra 80th: Live in Concert – Frank Sinatra
- 1995 Tails – Lisa Loeb
- 1995 Tambu – Toto
- 1995 Vaughan Williams: Fantasia on a theme by Thomas Tallis; Symphony No. 5; Previn: Reflections
- 1995 We Live Here – Pat Metheny Group
- 1996 A Place in the World – Mary Chapin Carpenter
- 1996 Banana Wind – Jimmy Buffett
- 1996 Beyond the Missouri Sky (Short Stories) – Pat Metheny and Charlie Haden
- 1996 Crash – Dave Matthews Band
- 1996 Mortal City – Dar Williams
- 1996 Neurotic Outsiders – Neurotic Outsiders
- 1996 No Talking, Just Head – The Heads
- 1996 Quartet – Pat Metheny
- 1996 Remember – Rusted Root
- 1996 The Great Southern Trendkill – Pantera
- 1996 Tidal – Fiona Apple
- 1996 Villains – The Verve Pipe
- 1996 You've Got to Believe in Something – Spin Doctors
- 1997 Aftertaste – Helmet
- 1997 Around the Fur – Deftones
- 1997 Beautiful World – Big Head Todd and the Monsters
- 1997 Feelings – David Byrne
- 1997 Firecracker – Lisa Loeb
- 1997 Good Feeling – Travis
- 1997 Heaven & Hell – Joe Jackson
- 1997 Imaginary Day – Pat Metheny Group
- 1997 Junction Seven – Steve Winwood
- 1997 Middle of Nowhere – Hanson
- 1997 Official Live: 101 Proof – Pantera
- 1997 Second-hand Smoke – Sublime
- 1997 Secret Samadhi – Live
- 1997 Snowed In – Hanson
- 1997 Stuff – Holly McNarland
- 1997 Stupid Stupid Stupid – Black Grape
- 1997 The Dance – Fleetwood Mac
- 1997 The More Things Change... – Machine Head
- 1997 Third Eye Blind – Third Eye Blind
- 1998 Before These Crowded Streets – Dave Matthews Band
- 1998 Celebrity Skin – Hole
- 1998 Mechanical Animals – Marilyn Manson
- 1998 Obsolete – Fear Factory
- 1998 On Eagle's Wings – Michael Crawford
- 1998 Ray of Light – Madonna
- 1998 Sketches for My Sweetheart the Drunk – Jeff Buckley
- 1998 Soulfly – Soulfly
- 1998 Sunburn – Fuel
- 1998 The Water Garden – Alex De Grassi
- 1998 Up – R.E.M.
- 1998 Visual Audio Sensory Theater – VAST
- 1998 Whitechocolatespaceegg – Liz Phair
- 1998 You Are Here – Steve Khan
- 1999 'Til the Medicine Takes – Widespread Panic
- 1999 A Map of the World – Pat Metheny
- 1999 Anomie & Bonhomie – Scritti Politti
- 1999 Brave New World – Styx
- 1999 Buckcherry – Buckcherry
- 1999 Dosage – Collective Soul
- 1999 Everything You Want – Vertical Horizon
- 1999 February Son – Oleander
- 1999 First Love – Hikaru Utada
- 1999 Here Comes the Bride – Spin Doctors
- 1999 Human Clay – Creed
- 1999 Lost and Gone Forever – Guster
- 1999 Mindfields – Toto
- 1999 Nasty Little Thoughts – Stroke 9
- 1999 Northern Star – Melanie C
- 1999 Ricky Martin – Ricky Martin
- 1999 Street Faërie – Cree Summer
- 1999 Supernatural – Santana
- 1999 The Burning Red – Machine Head
- 1999 The Distance to Here – Live
- 1999 The Last Tour on Earth – Marilyn Manson
- 1999 Tight – Mindless Self Indulgence
- 2000 Awake – Godsmack
- 2000 Breach – The Wallflowers
- 2000 Caviar – Caviar
- 2000 Chore of Enchantment – Giant Sand
- 2000 Comatised – Leona Naess
- 2000 Everything You Ever Wanted to Know About Silence – Glassjaw
- 2000 Good Charlotte – Good Charlotte
- 2000 Gung Ho – Patti Smith
- 2000 Here Come the Noise Makers – Bruce Hornsby
- 2000 Horrorscope – Eve 6
- 2000 Night and Day II – Joe Jackson
- 2000 Now You See Inside – SR-71
- 2000 Poem – Delerium
- 2000 The Door – Keb' Mo'
- 2000 The Greyest of Blue Skies – Finger Eleven
- 2000 The Height of Callousness – Spineshank
- 2000 Warning – Green Day

=== 2000s–2010s ===
- 2001 Bleed American – Jimmy Eat World
- 2001 Cocky – Kid Rock
- 2001 Don't Tell the Band – Widespread Panic
- 2001 Irresistible – Jessica Simpson
- 2001 J.Lo – Jennifer Lopez
- 2001 Laundry Service – Shakira
- 2001 Momentum – TobyMac
- 2001 Rockin' the Suburbs – Ben Folds
- 2001 Satellite – P.O.D.
- 2001 Supercharger – Machine Head
- 2001 The Anatomy of the Tongue in Cheek – Relient K
- 2001 Underneath – The Verve Pipe
- 2001 V – Live
- 2001 What I Learned About Ego, Opinion, Art & Commerce – Goo Goo Dolls
- 2002 3 – Soulfly
- 2002 A Jackknife to a Swan – The Mighty Mighty Bosstones
- 2002 Away from the Sun – 3 Doors Down
- 2002 Babylon – Skindred
- 2002 Ben Folds Live – Ben Folds
- 2002 Big Swing Face – Bruce Hornsby
- 2002 Bitterness the Star – 36 Crazyfists
- 2002 Bounce – Bon Jovi
- 2002 Busted Stuff – Dave Matthews Band
- 2002 Cake and Pie – Lisa Loeb
- 2002 Come Away with Me – Norah Jones
- 2002 Dark Days – Coal Chamber
- 2002 Darkhorse – Crazy Town
- 2002 Highly Evolved – The Vines
- 2002 It Had to Be You: The Great American Songbook – Rod Stewart
- 2002 October Road – James Taylor
- 2002 OK Go – OK Go
- 2002 Silence – Blindside
- 2002 Speaking of Now – Pat Metheny Group
- 2002 The Big Room – M2M
- 2002 To Whom It May Concern – Splender
- 2002 Tomorrow – SR-71
- 2002 Trapt – Trapt
- 2002 Waiting for My Rocket to Come – Jason Mraz
- 2003 At Last – Cyndi Lauper
- 2003 Birds of Pray – Live
- 2003 Blackout – Hed PE
- 2003 Chimera – Delerium
- 2003 Confession – Ill Niño
- 2003 Fallen – Evanescence
- 2003 Flutterby – Butterfly Boucher
- 2003 Ghosts – Sleeping at Last
- 2003 Go – Vertical Horizon
- 2003 Hatefiles – Fear Factory
- 2003 In Between Now and Then – O.A.R.
- 2003 In Reverie – Saves the Day
- 2003 Kid Rock – Kid Rock
- 2003 Live at Budokan – Sheryl Crow
- 2003 Liz Phair – Liz Phair
- 2003 Ocean Avenue – Yellowcard
- 2003 One Quiet Night – Pat Metheny
- 2003 Rock n Roll – Ryan Adams
- 2003 Rules of Travel – Rosanne Cash
- 2003 Self-Destructive Pattern – Spineshank
- 2003 Some Devil – Dave Matthews
- 2003 Speed Graphic – Ben Folds
- 2003 Stop All the World Now – Howie Day
- 2003 Thank You – Stone Temple Pilots
- 2003 The Trouble with Being Myself – Macy Gray
- 2003 Three Days Grace – Three Days Grace
- 2003 To Whom It May Concern – Lisa Marie Presley
- 2003 Two Angels and a Dream – Depswa
- 2003 Two Lefts Don't Make a Right...but Three Do – Relient K
- 2003 Year of the Spider – Cold
- 2004 America's Sweetheart – Courtney Love
- 2004 American Idiot – Green Day
- 2004 Around the Sun – R.E.M.
- 2004 Autobiography – Ashlee Simpson
- 2004 Baptism – Lenny Kravitz
- 2004 Barenaked for the Holidays – Barenaked Ladies
- 2004 Catalyst – New Found Glory
- 2004 Cool Morning – Sloan Wainwright
- 2004 From a Basement on the Hill – Elliott Smith
- 2004 Futures – Jimmy Eat World
- 2004 Getting Away with Murder – Papa Roach
- 2004 Halcyon Days – Bruce Hornsby
- 2004 Has Been – William Shatner
- 2004 Healing Rain – Michael W. Smith
- 2004 Hopes and Fears – Keane
- 2004 Love Is Hell – Ryan Adams
- 2004 Mmhmm – Relient K
- 2004 Our Shadows Will Remain – Joseph Arthur
- 2004 Pawn Shoppe Heart – The Von Bondies
- 2004 Potter's Field - 12 Stones
- 2004 Prophecy – Soulfly
- 2004 Seven Circles – The Tea Party
- 2004 Show and Tell – Silvertide
- 2004 Size Matters – Helmet
- 2004 South of Sideways - Edgewater
- 2004 Speak – Lindsay Lohan
- 2004 Super D – Ben Folds
- 2004 Take It All Away – Ryan Cabrera
- 2004 Take It from the Top – Bob James
- 2004 The Capitol Albums, Volume 1 – The Beatles
- 2004 The Crash of '47 – Atomship
- 2004 The Dana Owens Album – Queen Latifah
- 2004 The Sound of White – Missy Higgins
- 2004 Trouble – Bonnie McKee
- 2004 Up the Dose – Skrape
- 2004 Vol. 3: (The Subliminal Verses) – Slipknot
- 2004 Where You Want to Be – Taking Back Sunday
- 2004 Who Killed...... The Zutons? – The Zutons
- 2004 Winning Days – The Vines
- 2005 15 – Buckcherry
- 2005 Alex Lloyd – Alex Lloyd
- 2005 All That I Am – Santana
- 2005 All the Right Reasons – Nickelback
- 2005 Apathetic EP – Relient K
- 2005 Best of Soul – BoA
- 2005 Broken Valley – Life of Agony
- 2005 Bullet in a Bible – Green Day
- 2005 Catch Without Arms – dredg
- 2005 Everything Is – Nine Black Alps
- 2005 From the Ground Up – Antigone Rising
- 2005 Gasoline – Theory of a Deadman
- 2005 Hours – Funeral for a Friend
- 2005 I Am Me - Ashlee Simpson
- 2005 Lifehouse – Lifehouse
- 2005 Lost and Found – Mudvayne
- 2005 Move Along – The All-American Rejects
- 2005 Mr. A-Z – Jason Mraz
- 2005 Nothing Is Sound – Switchfoot
- 2005 Odditorium or Warlords of Mars – The Dandy Warhols
- 2005 Odyssey – Fischerspooner
- 2005 On the Outside – Starsailor
- 2005 Possibilities – Herbie Hancock
- 2005 See You on the Other Side – Korn
- 2005 Somebody's Miracle – Liz Phair
- 2005 Songs for Silverman – Ben Folds
- 2005 Supernature – Goldfrapp
- 2005 Takk... – Sigur Rós
- 2005 Ten Thousand Fists – Disturbed
- 2005 Thanks for the Memory: The Great American Songbook, Volume IV – Rod Stewart
- 2005 The Way Up – Pat Metheny Group
- 2005 The Weight Is a Gift – Nada Surf
- 2005 Us and Them – Shinedown
- 2005 Winter Wonderland – Point of Grace
- 2005 Worlds Apart – ...And You Will Know Us by the Trail of Dead
- 2006 4 – Gerling
- 2006 A Death-Grip on Yesterday – Atreyu
- 2006 A Decade – Our Lady Peace
- 2006 As Daylight Dies – Killswitch Engage
- 2006 Beautiful World – Take That
- 2006 Black Cadillac – Rosanne Cash
- 2006 Black Fingernails, Red Wine – Eskimo Joe
- 2006 Black Stone Cherry – Black Stone Cherry
- 2006 Chopped, Screwed, Live and Unglued – Korn
- 2006 Come What(ever) May – Stone Sour
- 2006 Coming Home – New Found Glory
- 2006 Daughtry – Daughtry
- 2006 Daylight – Needtobreathe
- 2006 Decemberunderground – AFI
- 2006 Don't You Fake It – The Red Jumpsuit Apparatus
- 2006 Dusk and Summer – Dashboard Confessional
- 2006 End of Silence – Red
- 2006 Every Man for Himself – Hoobastank
- 2006 Every Second Counts – Plain White T's
- 2006 Full of Elevating Pleasures – Boom Boom Satellites
- 2006 Ganging Up on the Sun – Guster
- 2006 Goodbye Alice in Wonderland – Jewel
- 2006 If Only You Were Lonely - Hawthorne Heights
- 2006 Let Love In – Goo Goo Dolls
- 2006 Lights and Sounds – Yellowcard
- 2006 Live Trucker – Kid Rock
- 2006 Oh! Gravity. – Switchfoot
- 2006 One-X – Three Days Grace
- 2006 Phobia – Breaking Benjamin
- 2006 Robbers & Cowards – Cold War Kids
- 2006 Rock Star Supernova – Rock Star Supernova
- 2006 Saosin – Saosin
- 2006 Sleep Is the Enemy – Danko Jones
- 2006 Songs from Black Mountain – Live
- 2006 Still Searching – Senses Fail
- 2006 Supremacy – Hatebreed
- 2006 Ta-Dah – Scissor Sisters
- 2006 Tears Don't Fall – Bullet for My Valentine
- 2006 Testify – P.O.D.
- 2006 The Black Parade – My Chemical Romance
- 2006 The Capitol Albums, Volume 2 – The Beatles
- 2006 The Crusade – Trivium
- 2006 The Open Door – Evanescence
- 2006 The Paramour Sessions – Papa Roach
- 2006 The Poison: Live at Brixton – Bullet for My Valentine
- 2006 The Reckoning – Pillar
- 2006 The Sufferer & the Witness – Rise Against
- 2006 This New Day – Embrace
- 2006 This Old Road – Kris Kristofferson
- 2006 Till the Sun Turns Black – Ray LaMontagne
- 2006 Tired of Hanging Around – The Zutons
- 2006 True Self – SOiL
- 2006 Under the Iron Sea – Keane
- 2006 Until There's Nothing Left of Us – Kill Hannah
- 2006 Up in the Attic – Alien Ant Farm
- 2006 We Are Glitter – Goldfrapp
- 2007 Alpha – Sevendust
- 2007 Another Animal – Another Animal
- 2007 Anthem for the Underdog - 12 Stones
- 2007 Because of the Times – Kings of Leon
- 2007 Calling the World – Rooney
- 2007 Chase This Light – Jimmy Eat World
- 2007 Cities – Anberlin
- 2007 Consequence – The Crash Motive
- 2007 Control – GoodBooks
- 2007 Exposed – Boom Boom Satellites
- 2007 Famous – Puddle of Mudd
- 2007 Finding Beauty in Negative Spaces – Seether
- 2007 Five Score and Seven Years Ago – Relient K
- 2007 From Them, Through Us, to You - Madina Lake
- 2007 Good Morning Revival – Good Charlotte
- 2007 Happiness Ltd. – Hot Hot Heat
- 2007 Infinity on High – Fall Out Boy
- 2007 It Won't Be Soon Before Long – Maroon 5
- 2007 Jonas Brothers – Jonas Brothers
- 2007 Let It Snow, Baby... Let It Reindeer – Relient K
- 2007 Notes from the Past – Taking Back Sunday
- 2007 One Man Band – James Taylor
- 2007 Paper Walls – Yellowcard
- 2007 Quartet – Pat Metheny
- 2007 Red Harvest – Bloodsimple
- 2007 Riot! – Paramore
- 2007 Rock n Roll Jesus – Kid Rock
- 2007 Runnin' Wild – Airbourne
- 2007 Scary Kids Scaring Kids - Scary Kids Scaring Kids
- 2007 Scream – Tokio Hotel
- 2007 Seven Second Surgery - Faber Drive
- 2007 Smile for Them - Armor for Sleep
- 2007 So Wrong, It's Right – All Time Low
- 2007 Songs of Mass Destruction – Annie Lennox
- 2007 Them vs. You vs. Me – Finger Eleven
- 2007 This Moment – Steven Curtis Chapman
- 2007 Underclass Hero – Sum 41
- 2007 Vena Sera – Chevelle
- 2007 Venus Doom – HIM
- 2007 Volta – Björk
- 2007 Who We Are – Lifehouse
- 2007 Wolves – Idiot Pilot
- 2008 Agony & Irony – Alkaline Trio
- 2008 All Hope Is Gone – Slipknot
- 2008 Appeal to Reason – Rise Against
- 2008 Bittersweet World – Ashlee Simpson
- 2008 Chapter VII: Hope & Sorrow – Sevendust
- 2008 Dark Horse – Nickelback
- 2008 Death Magnetic – Metallica
- 2008 Don't Forget – Demi Lovato
- 2008 Duo – Richard Marx and Matt Scannell
- 2008 Folie à Deux – Fall Out Boy
- 2008 From First to Last – From First to Last
- 2008 Heart Station – Hikaru Utada
- 2008 Hello Love – Chris Tomlin
- 2008 The Illusion of Progress – Staind
- 2008 Indestructible – Disturbed
- 2008 It Is Time for a Love Revolution – Lenny Kravitz
- 2008 Last Night – Moby
- 2008 Live in Phoenix – Fall Out Boy
- 2008 Liverpool 8 – Ringo Starr
- 2008 Lost in the Sound of Separation – Underoath
- 2008 Low vs Diamond – Low vs Diamond
- 2008 Never Too Loud – Danko Jones
- 2008 New Surrender - Anberlin
- 2008 Satisfied – Taylor Dayne
- 2008 Scars & Souvenirs – Theory of a Deadman
- 2008 Scream Aim Fire – Bullet for My Valentine
- 2008 Shogun – Trivium
- 2008 Simple Plan – Simple Plan
- 2008 Snacktime! – Barenaked Ladies
- 2008 Take It to the Limit – Hinder
- 2008 The Black Swan – Story of the Year
- 2008 The Moon Under Water – Ryan Cabrera
- 2008 The New Game – Mudvayne
- 2008 The Script – The Script
- 2008 The Sound of Madness – Shinedown
- 2009 21st Century Breakdown – Green Day
- 2009 A Fine Mess – Kate Voegele
- 2009 Alter the Ending – Dashboard Confessional
- 2009 Artwork – The Used
- 2009 Awake – Skillet
- 2009 Believe – Orianthi
- 2009 Big Whiskey & the GrooGrux King – Dave Matthews Band
- 2009 Black Gives Way to Blue – Alice in Chains
- 2009 Can't Keep a Secret - Faber Drive
- 2009 Dear Agony – Breaking Benjamin
- 2009 Evangelion – Behemoth
- 2009 For Your Entertainment – Adam Lambert
- 2009 For(n)ever – Hoobastank
- 2009 Full Circle – Creed
- 2009 Halestorm – Halestorm
- 2009 Happy Hour – Uncle Kracker
- 2009 Hello Hurricane – Switchfoot
- 2009 Humanoid – Tokio Hotel
- 2009 It's Blitz! – Yeah Yeah Yeahs
- 2009 Killswitch Engage – Killswitch Engage
- 2009 Leave This Town – Daughtry
- 2009 Lonely Road – The Red Jumpsuit Apparatus
- 2009 Mean Everything to Nothing – Manchester Orchestra
- 2009 Metamorphosis – Papa Roach
- 2009 Mudvayne – Mudvayne
- 2009 New Again – Taking Back Sunday
- 2009 Night Castle – Trans-Siberian Orchestra
- 2009 Not Without a Fight – New Found Glory
- 2009 Nothing Personal – All Time Low
- 2009 Ocean Eyes – Owl City
- 2009 One Hundred Years from Now – Dennis DeYoung
- 2009 Picture Perfect – SOiL
- 2009 Save Me, San Francisco – Train
- 2009 Say Anything – Say Anything
- 2009 Sci-Fi Crimes – Chevelle
- 2009 The List – Rosanne Cash
- 2009 The Resistance – Muse
- 2009 The Show Must Go – Hedley
- 2009 Wait for Me – Moby

=== 2010s to 2020 ===
- 2010 AB III – Alter Bridge
- 2010 Alive – Ed Kowalczyk
- 2010 All My Friends Are Here – Arif Mardin
- 2010 All in Good Time – Barenaked Ladies
- 2010 And If Our God Is for Us... – Chris Tomlin
- 2010 Asylum – Disturbed
- 2010 Audio Secrecy – Stone Sour
- 2010 Believe (II) – Orianthi
- 2010 Best of Tokio Hotel – Tokio Hotel
- 2010 Cardiology – Good Charlotte
- 2010 Cold Day Memory – Sevendust
- 2010 Danger Days: The True Lives of the Fabulous Killjoys – My Chemical Romance
- 2010 Diamond Eyes – Deftones
- 2010 Fever – Bullet for My Valentine
- 2010 Go – Jónsi
- 2010 Guitar Heaven: The Greatest Guitar Classics of All Time – Santana
- 2010 Hang Cool Teddy Bear – Meat Loaf
- 2010 Hoodoo – Krokus
- 2010 Infestation – Ratt
- 2010 Invented – Jimmy Eat World
- 2010 Kaleidoscope Heart – Sara Bareilles
- 2010 Korn III: Remember Who You Are – Korn
- 2010 Life Turns Electric – Finger Eleven
- 2010 Live It Up – Lee DeWyze
- 2010 Live from Freedom Hall – Lynyrd Skynyrd
- 2010 MTV Unplugged – All Time Low
- 2010 My Darkest Days – My Darkest Days
- 2010 Nightmare – Avenged Sevenfold
- 2010 No Apologies – Trapt
- 2010 No Guts. No Glory. – Airbourne
- 2010 Science & Faith – The Script
- 2010 Screamworks: Love in Theory and Practice – HIM
- 2010 Some Kind of Trouble – James Blunt
- 2010 Stone Temple Pilots – Stone Temple Pilots
- 2010 Tear the World Down – We Are the Fallen
- 2010 The Constant – Story of the Year
- 2010 The Incredible Machine – Sugarland
- 2010 The Powerless Rise – As I Lay Dying
- 2010 The Trouble with Angels – Filter
- 2010 This Addiction – Alkaline Trio
- 2010 Time for Annihilation: On the Record & On the Road – Papa Roach
- 2010 Tonight – TobyMac
- 2010 Vintage Vinos – Keith Richards
- 2010 VOCAbuLarieS – Bobby McFerrin
- 2010 What Separates Me from You – A Day to Remember
- 2010 Wonderlustre – Skunk Anansie
- 2010 Ø (Disambiguation) – Underoath
- 2011 A Dramatic Turn of Events – Dream Theater
- 2011 All Things Bright and Beautiful – Owl City
- 2011 All You Need Is Now – Duran Duran
- 2011 Awesome as Fuck – Green Day
- 2011 Between the Devil & the Deep Blue Sea – Black Stone Cherry
- 2011 Blessed – Lucinda Williams
- 2011 Break the Spell – Daughtry
- 2011 Call to Arms – Saxon
- 2011 Ceremonials – Florence and the Machine **Grammy Nomination
- 2011 Christmas in Diverse City – TobyMac
- 2011 Decas – As I Lay Dying
- 2011 Endgame – Rise Against
- 2011 Evanescence – Evanescence
- 2011 Dirty Work – All Time Low
- 2011 Get Your Heart On! – Simple Plan
- 2011 Everything Changes – Julian Lennon
- 2011 Goodbye Lullaby – Avril Lavigne
- 2011 In Waves – Trivium
- 2011 In Your Dreams – Stevie Nicks
- 2011 Inni – Sigur Rós
- 2011 Live at Shea Stadium: The Concert – Billy Joel
- 2011 Lovestrong – Christina Perri
- 2011 Luna Sea – Luna Sea
- 2011 Música + Alma + Sexo – Ricky Martin
- 2011 Hats Off to the Bull – Chevelle
- 2011 Hell in a Handbasket – Meat Loaf
- 2011 Holding Onto Strings Better Left to Fray – Seether
- 2011 How Great Is Our God: The Essential Collection – Chris Tomlin
- 2011 Prisoner – The Jezabels
- 2011 Regeneration: Volume I & II – Styx
- 2011 Screaming Bloody Murder – Sum 41
- 2011 Shallow Bay: The Best of Breaking Benjamin – Breaking Benjamin
- 2011 Skynyrd Nation – Lynyrd Skynyrd
- 2011 Something for the Pain – Redlight King
- 2011 Songwriter – Paul Simon
- 2011 Staind – Staind
- 2011 Reanimate 2.0: The Covers EP – Halestorm
- 2011 Th1rt3en – Megadeth
- 2011 The Best Of... The Great American Songbook – Rod Stewart
- 2011 The Big Roar – The Joy Formidable
- 2011 The Bright Lights EP – Gary Clark, Jr.
- 2011 The Essential Meat Loaf – Meat Loaf
- 2011 The Hunter – Mastodon
- 2011 The Hymn of a Broken Man – Times of Grace
- 2011 The Lost Children – Disturbed
- 2011 The Path of Totality – Korn
- 2011 The Reckoning – Needtobreathe
- 2011 The Sea of Memories – Bush
- 2011 The Truth Is... – Theory of a Deadman
- 2011 The Unforgiving – Within Temptation
- 2011 Time of My Life – 3 Doors Down
- 2011 Under Your Skin – Saliva
- 2011 Vice Verses – Switchfoot
- 2011 Vices and Virtues – Art of Dying
- 2011 War of Angels - Pop Evil
- 2011 What's It All About – Pat Metheny
- 2011 When You're Through Thinking, Say Yes – Yellowcard
- 2011 White Collar Lies – Kopek
- 2011 Live Life Loud and Crazy Love - Hawk Nelson
- 2012 3 – The Script
- 2012 Amaryllis – Shinedown
- 2012 America America – BeBe Winans
- 2012 Antennas to Hell – Slipknot
- 2012 Awakened – As I Lay Dying
- 2012 Away from the World – Dave Matthews Band
- 2012 Black Traffic – Skunk Anansie
- 2012 Blak and Blu – Gary Clark, Jr.
- 2012 Christmas Gift Pack – Chris Tomlin
- 2012 Collide with the Sky – Pierce the Veil
- 2012 Days Go By – The Offspring
- 2012 Dead Silence – Billy Talent
- 2012 Don't Panic – All Time Low
- 2012 Dreams of Fireflies (On a Christmas Night) – Trans-Siberian Orchestra
- 2012 Into the Light – Matthew West **Grammy Nomination
- 2012 Fire It Up – Joe Cocker
- 2012 King Animal – Soundgarden
- 2012 Koi No Yokan – Deftones
- 2012 Last Parade – Call Me No One
- 2012 Last of a Dyin' Breed – Lynyrd Skynyrd
- 2012 Barefoot at the Symphony Tour – Idina Menzel
- 2012 Out of the Game – Rufus Wainwright
- 2012 Phantom Antichrist – Kreator
- 2012 North – Matchbox Twenty
- 2012 Songs for the End of the World – Rick Springfield
- 2012 Southern Air – Yellowcard
- 2012 The Duke – Joe Jackson
- 2012 The Midsummer Station – Owl City
- 2012 The Orchestrion Project – Pat Metheny
- 2012 The Strange Case Of... – Halestorm
- 2012 Traveller – Jerry Douglas
- 2012 Unity Band – Pat Metheny
- 2012 Valtari – Sigur Rós
- 2012 Where I find You – Kari Jobe **Grammy Nomination
- 2012 The 2nd Law – Muse
- 2012 ¡Dos! – Green Day
- 2012 ¡Tré! – Green Day
- 2012 ¡Uno! – Green Day
- 2012 Generation Freakshow – Feeder
- 2013 8:18 – The Devil Wears Prada
- 2013 A Life by Design? – Fight or Flight
- 2013 All That Echoes – Josh Groban
- 2013 All This for a King: The Essential Collection – David Crowder Band
- 2013 BE – Beady Eye
- 2013 Black Dog Barking – Airbourne
- 2013 Black Out the Sun – Sevendust
- 2013 Bookmarks – Five for Fighting
- 2013 Breach – The Kissaway Trail
- 2013 Burning Lights – Chris Tomlin **Grammy Nomination
- 2013 Christmas Gift Pack – Jeremy Camp
- 2013 Common Courtesy – A Day to Remember
- 2013 Damage – Jimmy Eat World
- 2013 Device – Device
- 2013 Dream Theater – Dream Theater
- 2013 Echoes from the Underground – Vertical Horizon
- 2013 Exile – Hurts
- 2013 Face the Music – Marianas Trench
- 2013 Fashionably Late – Falling in Reverse
- 2013 Feel – Sleeping with Sirens
- 2013 Fortress – Alter Bridge
- 2013 From Death to Destiny – Asking Alexandria
- 2013 Fuse – Keith Urban
- 2013 Golden – Lady Antebellum
- 2013 Hail Mary – Dark New Day
- 2013 If the River Was Whiskey – Spin Doctors
- 2013 If You Have Ghost – Ghost B.C.
- 2013 Infestissumam – Ghost B.C.
- 2013 Kveikur – Sigur Rós
- 2013 Lastima Que Sean Ajenas – Pepe Aguilar **Grammy Nomination
- 2013 Live at Rome Olympic Stadium – Muse
- 2013 Locked & Loaded – Eve To Adam
- 2013 Long Forgotten Songs: B-Sides & Covers 2000–2013 – Rise Against
- 2013 Lucky Numbers – Dave Stewart
- 2013 Magnetic – Goo Goo Dolls
- 2013 Mechanical Bull – Kings of Leon **Grammy Nomination
- 2013 New – Paul McCartney
- 2013 Opposites – Biffy Clyro
- 2013 Paramore – Paramore
- 2013 Pepper – Pepper
- 2013 Prográmaton – Zoé
- 2013 Proof of Life – Scott Stapp
- 2013 Reflektor – Arcade Fire **Grammy Nomination
- 2013 Release the Panic – Red
- 2013 Reveal the Change – Silent Voices
- 2013 The Revelation – Coldrain
- 2013 Rise – Skillet
- 2013 Savages – Soulfly
- 2013 Say the Words – Wanting Qu
- 2013 Seether: 2002-2013 – Seether
- 2013 Sempiternal – Bring Me the Horizon
- 2013 Spirityouall – Bobby McFerrin
- 2013 Stairway to Hell – Ugly Kid Joe
- 2013 Super Collider – Megadeth
- 2013 Tap: Book of Angels Volume 20 – Pat Metheny
- 2013 Tears on Tape – HIM
- 2013 Temper Temper – Bullet for My Valentine
- 2013 The Catalyst Fire – Dead Letter Circus
- 2013 The Complete Album Collection – Paul Simon
- 2013 The Devil Put Dinosaurs Here – Alice in Chains **Grammy Nomination
- 2013 The Dream Calls for Blood – Death Angel
- 2013 The Flood and the Mercy – Ed Kowalczyk
- 2013 The Sun Comes Out Tonight – Filter
- 2013 This World Won't Last Forever, But Tonight We Can Pretend – Matt Hires
- 2013 To Be Loved – Michael Bublé
- 2013 Too Weird to Live, Too Rare to Die! – Panic! at the Disco
- 2013 Triumph and Power – Grand Magus
- 2013 Tug of War – Red Line Chemistry
- 2013 Two Lanes of Freedom – Tim McGraw **Grammy Nomination
- 2013 Vengeance Falls – Trivium
- 2013 We as Human – We as Human
- 2013 What About Now – Bon Jovi
- 2013 Wild Life – Hedley
- 2013 Wrong Guy (I Did It This Time) – Whitney Wolanin
- 2013 Your Grace Finds Me – Matt Redman
- 2013 Zigaexperientia – Supercell
- 2014 5 Seconds of Summer – 5 Seconds of Summer
- 2014 747 – Lady Antebellum
- 2014 A Matter of Trust: The Bridge to Russia – Billy Joel
- 2014 Agua Maldita – Molotov
- 2014 Behind the Light – Phillip Phillips
- 2014 Between the Stars – Flyleaf
- 2014 Black Veil Brides – Black Veil Brides
- 2014 Bloodstone & Diamonds – Machine Head
- 2014 Bloodsuckers – VAMPS
- 2014 Broken Compass – Sleepwave
- 2014 Bulletproof Picasso – Train
- 2014 Cavalier Youth – You Me at Six
- 2014 Dear Youth – The Ghost Inside
- 2014 Disgusting – Beartooth
- 2014 Doom Abuse – The Faint
- 2014 Everything Will Be Alright in the End – Weezer
- 2014 Fading West – Switchfoot
- 2014 From the Spark – Grizfolk
- 2014 Ghost Stories – Coldplay **Grammy Nomination
- 2014 Ghost Stories Live 2014 – Coldplay
- 2014 Glory – Kutless
- 2014 Going to Hell – The Pretty Reckless
- 2014 Gord Downie, The Sadies, and the Conquering Sun – The Sadies
- 2014 High Priestess – Kobra and the Lotus
- 2014 Hits – Billy Talent
- 2014 Hydra – Within Temptation
- 2014 I Never Learn – Lykke Li
- 2014 Isolate and Medicate – Seether
- 2014 Kin – Pat Metheny
- 2014 Let's Go Extinct – Fanfarlo
- 2014 Lift a Sail – Yellowcard
- 2014 Magic Mountain – Black Stone Cherry
- 2014 Man on the Run – Bush
- 2014 May Death Never Stop You – My Chemical Romance
- 2014 Memoirs of a Murderer – King 810
- 2014 Agua Maldita – Molotov **Grammy Nomination
- 2014 Mind over Matter – Young the Giant
- 2014 No Fixed Address – Nickelback
- 2014 No Sound Without Silence – The Script
- 2014 Once More 'Round the Sun – Mastodon
- 2014 Our Endless War – Whitechapel
- 2014 Pop Psychology – Neon Trees
- 2014 Reincarnate – Motionless in White
- 2014 Restoring Force/Full Circle – Of Mice & Men
- 2014 Rise Up – Saliva
- 2014 Rise of the Lion – Miss May I
- 2014 Run Wild. Live Free. Love Strong. – For King & Country
- 2014 Savages – Theory of a Deadman
- 2014 Song in My Head – The String Cheese Incident
- 2014 Stuck – Adelitas Way
- 2014 Teeth Dreams – The Hold Steady
- 2014 The Beauty of Destruction – Devil You Know
- 2014 The Black Market – Rise Against
- 2014 The Human Contradiction – Delain
- 2014 The Satanist – Behemoth
- 2014 The Turn – Live
- 2014 Very Good Bad Thing – Mother Mother
- 2014 World on Fire – Slash featuring Myles Kennedy and The Conspirators
- 2014 Wovenwar – Wovenwar
- 2014 You Owe Nothing – Kill It Kid
- 2015 35xxxv – One Ok Rock
- 2015 Aesthesis – Dead Letter Circus
- 2015 Around the World and Back – State Champs
- 2015 Being as an Ocean – Being as an Ocean
- 2015 9 – Negrita
- 2015 Angel EP – Theory of a Deadman
- 2015 Before This World – James Taylor **Grammy Nomination
- 2015 Cauterize – Tremonti
- 2015 Dark Before Dawn – Breaking Benjamin
- 2015 Day of the Dead – Hollywood Undead
- 2015 Dogma – the GazettE
- 2015 Eclipse – Twin Shadow
- 2015 Fast Forward – Joe Jackson
- 2015 First Kiss – Kid Rock
- 2015 Future Hearts – All Time Low
- 2015 Holy War – Thy Art Is Murder
- 2015 How Big, How Blue, How Beautiful – Florence + the Machine **Grammy Nomination
- 2015 I Cant Stop – BoDeans
- 2015 I Will Follow – Jeremy Camp
- 2015 Immortalized – Disturbed
- 2015 Ire – Parkway Drive
- 2015 Live at Budokan: Red Night – Babymetal
- 2015 Locura Total – Fito Páez
- 2015 Madness – Sleeping with Sirens
- 2015 Metal Allegiance – Metal Allegiance
- 2015 Michael Ray – Michael Ray
- 2015 Mickey Guyton EP – Mickey Guyton
- 2015 Mobile Orchestra – Owl City
- 2015 Need to Know – Priory
- 2015 Out of the Wasteland – Lifehouse
- 2015 Paper Gods – Duran Duran
- 2015 Payola – Desaparecidos
- 2015 Rise Up – Art of Dying
- 2015 Saint Asonia – Saint Asonia
- 2015 Space – The Devil Wears Prada
- 2015 That's the Spirit – Bring Me the Horizon
- 2015 The Color Before the Sun – Coheed & Cambria
- 2015 Threat to Survival – Shinedown
- 2015 Three – Gloriana
- 2015 Uglier Than They Used ta Be – Ugly Kid Joe
- 2015 Under One Sky – The Tenors
- 2015 Vena – Coldrain
- 2015 Venom – Bullet for My Valentine
- 2015 Venus – Joy Williams
- 2015 Walls – Gateway Worship
- 2015 We Will Not Be Shaken (Live) – Bethel Music
- 2015 When the Morning Comes – A Great Big World
- 2015 + - – Mew
- 2016 13 Voices – Sum 41
- 2016 Adore: Christmas Songs of Worship – Chris Tomlin
- 2016 Afraid of Heights – Billy Talent
- 2016 Anarchytecture – Skunk Anansie
- 2016 Astoria – Marianas Trench
- 2016 Bad Vibrations – A Day to Remember
- 2016 California – Blink-182 **Grammy Nominee
- 2016 Distortland – The Dandy Warhols
- 2016 DNA – Trapt
- 2016 Dystopia – Megadeth
- 2016 Exist! – Alexandros
- 2016 Have It All – Bethel Music
- 2016 Hidden City – The Cult
- 2016 Hurricane – Nick Fradiani
- 2016 If I'm the Devil – Letlive
- 2016 Incarnate – Killswitch Engage
- 2016 It's About Time – Hank Williams Jr.
- 2016 It's Not Over...The Hits So Far – Daughtry
- 2016 Kentucky – Black Stone Cherry
- 2016 Letters from the Labyrinth – Trans-Siberian Orchestra
- 2016 Limitless – Tonight Alive
- 2016 Love Riot – Newsboys
- 2016 Magma – Gojira **Grammy Nominee
- 2016 Matière Noire – Mass Hysteria
- 2016 Misadventures – Pierce the Veil
- 2016 No Place in Heaven – Mika
- 2016 Portrait – Cardiknox
- 2016 Rita Wilson – Rita Wilson
- 2016 Rocket Science – Rick Springfield
- 2016 S.O.A.R. – Devour the Day
- 2016 Santana IV – Santana
- 2016 Sinner – Aaron Lewis
- 2016 The Astonishing – Dream Theater
- 2016 The Evil Divide – Death Angel
- 2016 The Last Hero – Alter Bridge
- 2016 To Be Everywhere Is to Be Nowhere – Thrice
- 2016 Unleashed – Skillet
- 2016 Us and the Night – 3 Doors Down
- 2016 Wakrat – WAKRAT
- 2016 War – She Is We
- 2016 We Are the Ones – Dee Snider
- 2016 What's Inside: Songs from Waitress – Sara Bareilles
- 2016 Weezer – Weezer **Grammy Nomination
- 2016 Yellowcard – Yellowcard
- 2016 Aggressive – Beartooth
- 2016 Bang, Zoom, Crazy... Hello – Cheap Trick
- 2016 Before Sunrise – Modern Space
- 2016 Capsule: 1999–2016 – The Faint
- 2016 Cold World – Of Mice & Men
- 2016 Don't You – Wet
- 2016 Dust – Tremonti
- 2016 Hometown Life – Sully Erna
- 2016 Into the Wild Live: Chicago – Halestorm
- 2016 Lifelines – I Prevail
- 2016 Lunar Prelude – Delain
- 2016 Moonbathers – Delain
- 2016 Road Less Traveled – Boyce Avenue
- 2016 The Loudspeaker EP – MUNA
- 2016 The Memories Uninvited – One Less Reason
- 2016 The Black Parade/Living with Ghosts – My Chemical Romance
- 2016 The Unity Sessions – Pat Metheny
- 2016 To Celebrate Christmas – Jennifer Nettles
- 2016 Transit Blues – The Devil Wears Prada
- 2016 WALLS – Kings of Leon
- 2016 Who You Selling For – The Pretty Reckless
- 2016 Wrong Crowd – Tom Odell
- 2016 Beginner 初学者 – Joker Xue 薛之谦
- 2016 Just Right 刚刚好 – Joker Xue 薛之谦
- 2017 A Girl, a Bottle, a Boat – Train
- 2017 Reanimate 3.0: The Covers EP – Halestorm
- 2017 A Place Where There's No More Pain – Life of Agony
- 2017 Silver Eye – Goldfrapp
- 2017 About U – MUNA
- 2017 Ambitions – One OK Rock
- 2017 Songs of Cinema – Michael Bolton
- 2017 Feed the Machine – Nickelback
- 2017 Memphis... Yes, I'm Ready – Dee Dee Bridgewater
- 2017 3 Minutes to Midnight – Lawson Rollins
- 2017 Random – Charly Garcia
- 2017 Fail You Again – Can't Swim
- 2017 The Sick, Dumb and Happy – The Charm The Fury
- 2017 Residente – Residente *2017 Winner of a Latin Grammy for Album of the Year
- 2017 Believe – The String Cheese Incident
- 2017 Good Life Bad Liver – Justin Masters
- 2017 Cosas Vanas – Ciclo
- 2017 Dreamcar – Dreamcar
- 2017 Crooked Teeth – Papa Roach
- 2017 Fateless – Coldrain
- 2017 Sunrise – Day6
- 2017 Last Young Renegade – All Time Low
- 2017 We're Alright – Cheap Trick
- 2017 Being as an Ocean – Being as an Ocean
- 2017 Focus – Jae Jung Parc
- 2017 Mis-An-Thrope – DED
- 2017 Om – Park Won
- 2017 Walk on Water – Thirty Seconds to Mars
- 2017 Gossip – Sleeping with Sirens
- 2017 Skin & Earth – Lights
- 2017 Asking Alexandria – Asking Alexandria
- 2017 Wake Up Call – Theory of a Deadman
- 2017 Hallelujah Here Below – Elevation Worship **Grammy nominated
- 2017 Like The Wind 像风一样 – Joker Xue 薛之谦
- 2018 Vale – Black Veil Brides
- 2018 Collateral – Phillip Phillips
- 2018 Defy – Of Mice & Men
- 2018 Hallelujah Nights – Lanco
- 2018 Crooked Shadows – Dashboard Confessional
- 2018 Outsider – Three Days Grace
- 2018 Erase Me – Underoath
- 2018 Sound Doctrine – Naul
- 2018 When Legends Rise – Godsmack
- 2018 Ember – Breaking Benjamin
- 2018 Attention Attention – Shinedown
- 2018 Reverence – Parkway Drive
- 2018 Rollin' Stoned and Livin' Free – Them Evils
- 2018 Bigger – Sugarland
- 2018 A Dying Machine – Tremonti
- 2018 M/F – Matt Fishel
- 2018 Artificial Selection – Dance Gavin Dance
- 2018 Gravity – Bullet for My Valentine
- 2018 Killing Is My Business... and Business Is Good! – Megadeth
- 2018 Appetite for Destruction – Guns N' Roses
- 2018 Evolution – Disturbed
- 2018 Lemon – Kenshi Yonezu
- 2018 Various Artists – Muscle Shoals: Small Town, Big Sound
- 2018 Only Ticket Home – Gavin James
- 2018 Young and Dangerous – The Struts
- 2018 Jubilee Road – Tom Odell
- 2018 Hurry Up & Hang Around – Blues Traveler
- 2018 The Future – From Ashes to New
- 2018 Halftime – Karen Mok
- 2018 Vicious – Halestorm *Grammy Winner
- 2018 Disease – Beartooth
- 2018 Living the Dream – Slash (feat. Myles Kennedy & The Conspirators)
- 2018 Matzka Station – Matzka
- 2018 Pop Evil – Pop Evil
- 2018 Catharsis – Machine Head
- 2018 Be the Cowboy – Mitski
- 2019 Amo – Bring Me the Horizon
- 2019 The World Needs a Hero – Megadeth
- 2019 The System Has Failed – Megadeth
- 2019 Evolution – Kobra and the Lotus
- 2019 World War X – Carnifex
- 2019 Beauty of Youth – Pretty Vicious
- 2019 Wilder Woods – Wilder Woods
- 2019 Latenights and Longnecks – Justin Moore
- 2019 Freya Ridings – Freya Ridings
- 2019 Humanicide – Death Angel
- 2019 I, The Mask – In Flames
- 2019 Order in Decline – Sum 41
- 2019 Heartache Medication – Jon Pardi
- 2019 Victorius – Skillet
- 2019 State I'm In – Aaron Lewis
- 2019 No Saint – Lauren Jenkins
- 2019 Warheads on Foreheads – Megadeth
- 2019 Eye of the Storm – One Ok Rock
- 2019 You Are OK – The Maine
- 2019 Pop Talks – Judah and the Lion
- 2019 Trauma – I Prevail
- 2019 OK I'm Sick – Badflower
- 2019 Egowork – The Faint
- 2019 Maniac – Mass Hysteria
- 2019 Twenty – Taking Back Sunday
- 2019 Magnolia – Randy Houser
- 2019 Who Do You Trust? – Papa Roach
- 2019 The Side Effects – Coldrain

=== 2020s to present ===
- 2020 Decade – Fools Errant
- 2020 Si Vis Pacem, Para Bellum – Seether
- 2020 When You See Yourself – Kings of Leon
- 2020 What the Dead Men Say - Trivium
- 2020 Wake Up, Sunshine – All Time Low
- 2020 Viva the Underdogs – Parkway Drive
- 2020 This Christmas – Francesca Battistelli
- 2020 The Speed of Now, Vol. 1 - Keith Urban
- 2020 The Kingdom – Bush
- 2020 The Blessing [Live] – Kari Jobe
- 2020 The Best Ones of the Best Ones – Dashboard Confessional
- 2020 The Atlantic Years 1984–1990 – Ratt
- 2020 The Symbol Remains – Blue Öyster Cult
- 2020 The Human Condition – Black Stone Cherry
- 2020 Songs of Recovery – Darro
- 2020 Si Vis Pacem, Para Bellum – Seether
- 2020 Say Nothing – Theory of a Deadman
- 2020 Rancho Fiesta Sessions – Jon Pardi
- 2020 Odin's Raven Magic – Sigur Rós
- 2020 Next Girl – Carly Pearce
- 2020 New Empire, Vol. 2 – Hollywood Undead
- 2020 Mettavolution [Live] – Rodrigo y Gabriela
- 2020 Medium Rarities – Mastodon
- 2020 McGraw Machine Hits: 2013-2019 – Tim McGraw
- 2020 MONOMANIA – The Word Alive
- 2020 Lamb of God – Lamb of God
- 2020 If It Wasn't for You – Caylee Hammack
- 2020 I Hurt You, I Made This – Brother Sundance
- 2020 God, Family, Country – Craig Morgan
- 2020 Getting Good – Lauren Alaina
- 2020 From This Place – Pat Metheny
- 2020 DC Talk Collection – dc Talk
- 2020 Co-Starring – Ray Wylie Hubbard
- 2020 Bad Trick – Ray Wylie Hubbard
- 2020 Aurora – Breaking Benjamin
- 2020 American Standard – James Taylor
- 2020 Amends – Grey Daze
- 2020 All Distortions Are Intentional – Neck Deep
- 2020 Ain't Looking Back – Mo Pitney
- 2020 Acting My Age – The Academic / Cid Rim
- 2021 Should’ve Known Better - Carly Pearce
- 2021 Overcast – Almora Down
- 2021 Earth Is a Black Hole – Teenage Wrist
- 2021 Death by Rock and Roll – The Pretty Reckless
- 2021 Dangerous: The Double Album – Morgan Wallen
- 2021 29 – Carly Pearce
- 2021 Where Have You Gone – Alan Jackson
- 2021 When You See Yourself – Kings of Leon
- 2021 The Campfire – Needtobreathe
- 2021 The Sunday EP – Needtobreathe
- 2021 The Bitter Truth – Evanescence
- 2021 Surface Sounds – KALEO
- 2021 Straight Outta the Country – Justin Moore
- 2021 Reveries – Styx
- 2021 Real to Me – Callista Clark
- 2021 Paranoia – Maggie Lindemann
- 2021 Nowhere Generation – Rise Against
- 2021 Magnetic – Newsboys
- 2021 Love Songs – Take That
- 2021 Lazy Love Songs – Guster
- 2021 In Another World – Cheap Trick
- 2021 Fortitude – Gojira
- 2021 Encounter – Kari Jobe
- 2021 Crash of the Crown – Styx
- 2021 Blue Weekend – Wolf Alice
- 2021 Best Country Valentine's Day – various
- 2021 The Ironic Divide – Aziola Cry
- 2021 Best Thing Since Backroads – Jake Owen
- 2021 Dear Miss Loretta – Carly Pierce
- 2021 Don't Hate Me – Badflower
- 2021 Absurd – Guns N' Roses
- 2021 Stubborn Pride/Paradise Lost on Me – Zac Brown Band
- 2021 In the Court of the Dragon – Trivium
- 2021 Brushed – Quicksand
- 2021 Rambler – Bones Owens
- 2021 What's Coming to Me – Dorothy
- 2021 Kids – Sam Williams
- 2021 Songs of Loss and Separation – Times of Grace
- 2021 Girl Who Didn't Care – Tenille Townes
- 2021 White Buffalo – Crown Lands
- 2021 Tattoo – Girlfriends
- 2021 Family – Badflower
- 2021 Tequila Does – Miranda Lambert
- 2021 Only Us – Clayton Anderson
- 2021 Text You Back – Brother Sundance
- 2021 I am Nothing – Kat Von D
- 2021 Same Boat – Zac Brown Band
- 2021 American Rust – Ernest
- 2021 Nowhere Generation – Rise Against
- 2021 Chemical Warfare – Escape the Fate
- 2021 Godzilla – The Veronicas
- 2021 Bite Marks – AU/RA
- 2021 Child of the State – Ayron Jones
- 2021 Remind Me of You – Lily Rose
- 2021 Choke – The Warning
- 2021 Blurry – Hardy
- 2021 Help Me to Feel Again – Judah and the Lion
- 2021 Take Your Time – Ayron Jones
- 2022 You Proof – Morgan Wallen
- 2022 Water to Drink Not Write About – Florence + the Machine
- 2022 Voyeurist – Underoath
- 2022 Til My Last Day: The Love Songs – Justin Moore
- 2022 Thought You Should Know - Morgan Wallen
- 2022 The Tipping Point - Tears for Fears
- 2022 Still Dreamin – Tomoyasu Hotei
- 2022 Consilience - Libricide
- 2022 Stereotype – Cole Swindell
- 2022 Scoring the End of the World – Motionless in White
- 2022 ROX RMX, Vol. 2 – Roxette
- 2022 Planet Zero – Shinedown
- 2022 Nowhere Generation II – Rise Against
- 2022 My Favorite Ghosts – Florence + the Machine
- 2022 Live at the Roxy – The Tragically Hip
- 2022 Laurel Hell – Mitski
- 2022 "Last Night Lonely" – Jon Pardi
- 2022 Lalalalovesongs – Jason Mraz
- 2022 In Our Own Sweet Time – Vance Joy
- 2022 In Between: The Collection - Danielle Bradbery
- 2022 Impera – Ghost
- 2022 Hunter's Moon – Ghost
- 2022 Harder Than It Looks – Simple Plan
- 2022 Harder Than Hell – Florence + the Machine
- 2022 Growin' Up – Luke Combs
- 2022 Gifts from the Holy Ghost – DOROTHY
- 2022 Frayed at Both Ends – Aaron Lewis
- 2022 Don't Think Jesus – Morgan Wallen
- 2022 Dominion – Skillet
- 2022 Crisis of Faith - Billy Talent
- 2022 Co-Starring Too - Ray Wylie Hubbard
- 2022 Back from the Dead – Halestorm
- 2022 A Tribute to Led Zeppelin – Beth Hart
- 2022 1972 – T. Rex (Remastering)
- 2022 4 – Slash
- 2022 Luxury Disease – One Ok Rock
- 2022 The Sick, the Dying... and the Dead! – Megadeth
- 2022 True Power – I Prevail
- 2023 Lighting Up the Sky – Godsmack
- 2023 Coco Moon – Owl City
- 2023 Childhood Eyes – Yellowcard
- 2024 Saviors - Green Day
- 2024 DEGENERATE – Starset
- 2024 TokSik – Starset
- 2024 Revolution – Skillet
- 2024 Dystopia – Starset
- 2024 Keep Me Fed – The Warning
- 2025 The Scholars - Car Seat Headrest
- 2025 Silos – Starset
- 2026 Megadeth – Megadeth
- 2026 Monarch – Dead Poet Society

== 5.1 Surround sound ==
- 1997 Imaginary Day – Pat Metheny
- 1997 Hourglass – James Taylor
- 2001 Hotel California – Eagles
- 2001 Stiff Upper Lip Live – AC/DC
- 2005 Disasterpieces – Slipknot (Quadruple Platinum)
- 2005 Brick – Talking Heads
- 2006 True Stories – Talking Heads
- 2006 Remain in Light – Talking Heads
- 2006 Naked – Talking Heads
- 2006 Talking Heads: 77 – Talking Heads
- 2006 More Songs About Buildings and Food – Talking Heads
- 2006 Little Creatures – Talking Heads
- 2006 Fear of Music – Talking Heads
- 2006 Speaking in Tongues – Talking Heads
- 2008 Metallica – Metallica
- 2013 Live at Rome Olympic Stadium – Muse
- 2013 The Truth About Love – Pink

== Catalog remastering/box sets ==
- The Beatles (The Capitol Albums),
- Billy Joel – The Stranger 30th Anniversary Edition, My Lives
- Eagles
- Joe Walsh
- AC/DC
- Bob Marley
- James Brown
- Cat Stevens
- Kings of Leon
- The Complete Roadrunner Collection
- Fear Factory
- Madonna
- Aretha Franklin
- Paul Simon
- Keith Richards – The Only Offender US Box Set
- Duran Duran
- The Cars – The Cars, Candy-O, Panorama, Shake It Up, Heartbeat City, Door To Door, Best Of
- Guns N' Roses – Locked 'N Loaded **Grammy Nomination
- Luna Sea

== Motion picture soundtracks/Broadway shows ==
- 2020 Promising Young Woman [Original Motion Picture Soundtrack]
- 2017 The Shack: Music From and Inspired by the Original Motion Picture – Various Artists
- 2016 Captain Fantastic Soundtrack – Alex Somers
- 2016 School of Rock – The Musical (Original Cast Recording)
- 2016 Waitress – (Original Cast Recording)
- 2014 Unbroken – Alexandre Desplat
- 2014 Jersey Boys: Music from the Motion Picture and Broadway Musical – Bob Gaudio, Bob Crewe
- 2012 Newsies – Newsies – Alan Menken
- 2007 Silk [Original Motion Picture Soundtrack] – Ryuichi Sakamoto
- 2007 The Transformers: The Movie [2007 Live Action]
- 2006 Over the Hedge [Original Motion Picture Soundtrack] – Rupert Gregson-Williams
- 2005 Jersey Boys [Original Broadway Cast Recording] – Bob Gaudio, Bob Crewe
- 2005 Disney's On the Record [Original Cast Recording]
- 2005 Monty Python's Spamalot [Original Broadway Cast Recording]
- 2005 Rent [Selections from the Original Motion Picture Soundtrack]
- 2005 Robots [Original Soundtrack]
- 2005 The Chumscrubber [Original Motion Picture Score] – James Horner
- 2004 Taboo [Original Broadway Cast] – Boy George, Kevan Frost, John Themis. Richie Stevens
- 2004 Shall We Dance? – Music From The Motion Picture
- 2004 Bride and Prejudice [Original Soundtrack]
- 2003 Daredevil: "Bring Me To Life", "My Immortal" – Varèse Sarabande
- 2003 How to Deal [Original Soundtrack]
- 2003 Freddy vs. Jason [Original Soundtrack] – Graeme Revell, Machine Head
- 2003 Wicked: A New Musical [Original Broadway Cast Recording] – Stephen Schwartz
- 2002 Treasure Planet [Original Motion Picture Score] James Newton Howard
- 2002 Femme Fatale (Original Soundtrack) – Ryuichi Sakamoto
- 2000 Aida (Original Broadway Cast Recording) – Elton John And Tim Rice
- 1999 Annie Get Your Gun [1999 Broadway Revival Cast]
- 1999 Man on the Moon [Original Soundtrack]
- 1999 Jawbreaker [Original Soundtrack] – Stephen Endelman
- 1999 eXistenZ [Music from the Motion Picture] – Howard Shore
- 1998 Child's Play 4
- 1998 Snake Eyes [Music from the Motion Picture] – Ryuichi Sakamoto
- 1997 Crash [Original Motion Picture Soundtrack] Howard Shore
- 1997 West Side Story – Dave Grusin
- 1996 Before and After [Music from the Original Motion Picture Soundtrack] Howard Shore
- 1996 Big [Original Broadway Cast] –
- 1995 Dumb and Dumber – Todd Rundgren
- 1995 Cure [Original Soundtrack] – Dave Grusin
- 1994 Corrina Corrina [Original Soundtrack] – Rick Cox
- 1994 Ed Wood [Original Soundtrack] – Howard Shore
- 1994 Passion [Original Broadway Cast Recording] Original Broadway Cast – Stephen Sondheim and James Lapine
- 1994 The Client [Original Score] – Howard Shore
- 1993 Philadelphia – Jonathan Demme
- 1993 The Goodbye Girl [Broadway Cast] – Dave Grusin
- 1993 The Firm – Dave Grusin
- 1993 Teenage Mutant Ninja Turtles III – Original Motion Picture Soundtrack – Pete Ganbarg
- 1993 Mrs. Doubtfire [Original Soundtrack Album] – Howard Shore
- 1992 Reality Bites: Original Motion Picture Soundtrack
- 1992 Rush [Original Score] – Eric Clapton
- 1992 Twin Peaks – Fire Walk With Me (Music From The Motion Picture Soundtrack)
- 1992 White Men Can't Jump (Original Motion Picture Soundtrack)
- 1992 White Men Can't Rap (More Music From The Twentieth Century Fox Film White Men Can't Jump)
- 1991 Teenage Mutant Ninja Turtles II: The Secret of the Ooze (The Original Motion Picture Soundtrack)
- 1987 Hearts of Fire – Original Motion Picture Soundtrack
- 1986 She's Gotta Have It – Original Motion Picture Soundtrack – Bill Lee
- 1982 Little Shop of Horrors Cast Album – Howard Ashman & Alan Menken
- 1982 On Golden Pond Music From The Motion Picture Soundtrack – Dave Grusin

== Television and video documentaries ==
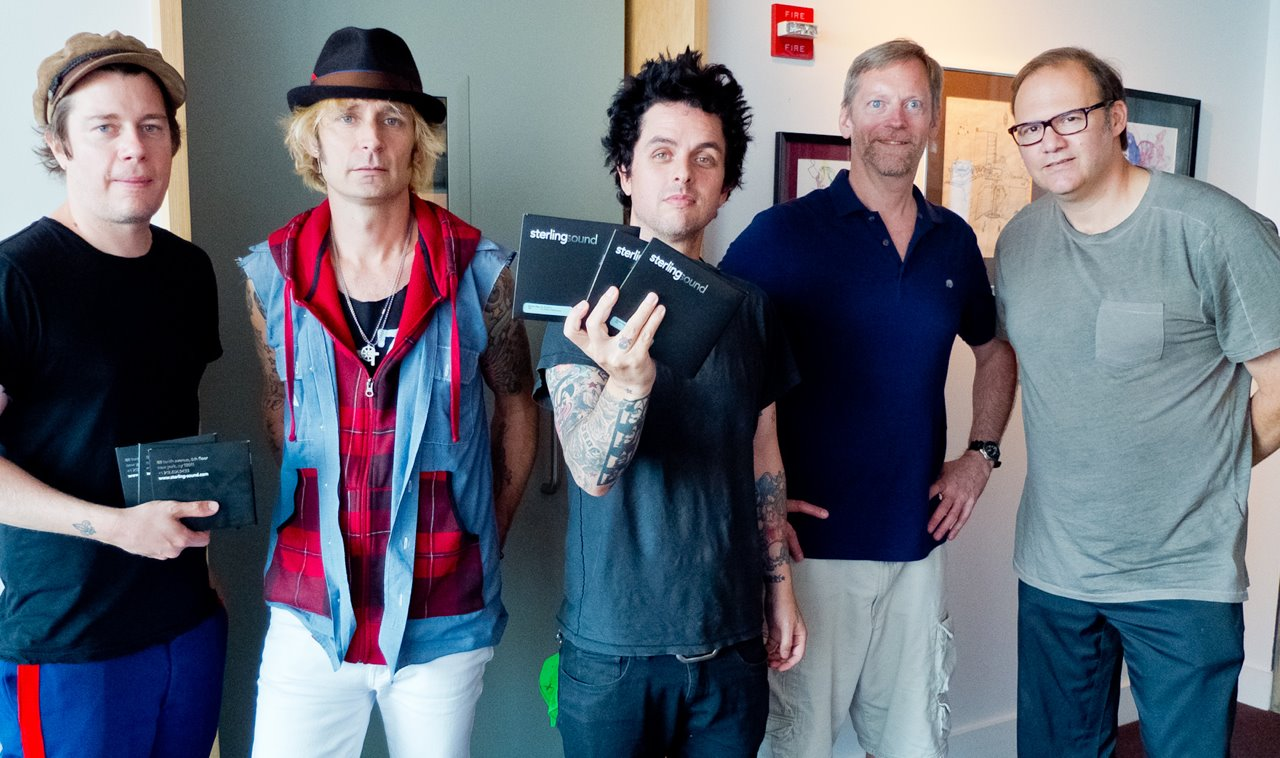
Green Day (minus Tré Cool) with Ted Jensen and Rob Cavallo

- 2014 Destiny – Score by Paul McCartney featuring "Hope for the Future"
- 2012 SUM 41: Blood in My Eyes (Video short)
- 2011 Sigur Rós: Inni (Documentary)
- 2010 Go Quiet Jonsi
- 2006 The Videos: 1989–2004 [Video] Metallica
- 2006 MTV Unplugged [DVD] Ricky Martin
- 2005 Green Day: Bullet in a Bible (Video documentary)
- 2005 A Supernatural Evening with Carlos Santana (TV Special)
- 2004 Worship at Red Rocks [DVD] John Tesh
- 2004 Live from the Eye of the Storm (Video short) (surround sound)
- 2004 Xenosaga Episode II: Jenseits von Gut und Böse (Video Game)
- 2003 Pearl Jam: Live at the Garden (Video documentary)
- 2002 Nickelback: Live at Home (Video documentary) (surround)
- 2002 Disasterpieces
- 2001 AC/DC: Stiff Upper Lip Live (Video documentary) (surround mixing)
- 2001 Pearl Jam: Touring Band 2000 (Video documentary)
- 1999 Madonna: The Video Collection 93:99
- 1999 SNL: 25 Years of Music
- 1999 VH1 Storytellers – Meat Loaf
- 1987 Moonlighting: The Television Soundtrack Album
