= The Beautiful Game (Acoustic Alchemy album) =

Studio album by Acoustic Alchemy
- Released: 6 April 2000
- Recorded: 1999–2000
- Studios: Coast Recorders, San Francisco, US; Tiny Telephone, San Francisco, US; Higher Ground, London, UK; Hansa Haus, Bonn, Germany
- Length: 62:48
- Labels: Higher Octave Music; 48946
- Producers: Richard Bull; Greg Carmichael; Miles Gilderdale

Acoustic Alchemy chronology
Positive Thinking... (1998)	The Beautiful Game (2000)	AArt (2001)

Professional ratings
Review scores
Source	Rating
AllMusic	4.5/5 stars

The Beautiful Game is the tenth full-length album by Acoustic Alchemy. It was released on April 6, 2000, and marked a turning point in the career of guitarist Greg Carmichael. This album was the first without founding member Nick Webb, who had died two years previously due to pancreatic cancer. Duties on steel string guitar were now filled by understudy Miles Gilderdale, who remains in the post to this day.

The album came as a stark change to fans of the group. Glossy production and radically different songwriting brought about a new 21st century sound, completely adverse to the style built up over a decade and a half up until this point. Experimentation was certainly a prominent factor in "The Beautiful Game". Tracks like "The Last Flamenco" brought drum and bass style synthesised loops, whilst "Kidstuff" employed a repeated sample of a baby giggling.

One of the band's longer efforts, the album lasts over an hour including two bonus tracks, featuring Greg Carmichael and John Parsons re-recording two of the tracks with a country and western style backing.

== Track listing ==
#	Title	Writers	Duration
1	"Angel Of The South"	Carmichael/Gilderdale	6:41
2	"The Panama Cat"	Carmichael/Gilderdale/Felix	5:04
3	"Trail Blazer"	Carmichael/Gilderdale/Parsons	5:00
4	"The Beautiful Game"	Carmichael/Disley	5:16
5	"Hats of Magic"	Carmichael/White	5:03
6	"Tête à Tête"	Carmichael/Disley	4:43
7	"The Last Flamenco"	Carmichael/Parsons/White	4:20
8	"Kidstuff"	Carmichael/White	4:19
9	"Big Sky Country"	Carmichael/Gilderdale/Parsons	4:34
10	"Hold On to Your Heart"	Carmichael/Parsons	4:11
11	"Jubilation"	Carmichael/Parsons	4:39
12	"Big Sky Country" (Nashville version)	Carmichael/Gilderdale/Parsons	4:17
13	"Trail Blazer" (Nashville version)	Carmichael/Gilderdale/Parsons	4:41

== Personnel ==
Studio:

- Producers: Richard Bull, Miles Gilderdale, Greg Carmichael, Steven Jones.
- Audio Mixers: Richard Bull; Steve Jones.
- Engineers include: Jim Sweeney, Richard Bull, Klaus Genuit.

Musicians:

- Miles Gilderdale (guitar, programming);
- Greg Carmichael, John Parsons (guitar);
- Jerry Douglas (dobro);
- Sam Bush (violin);
- Snake Davis (whistle, saxophone);
- Al Richardson, Pat Burgeson (harmonica);
- Guy Barker (trumpet);
- Terry Disley, Tony White, Simon Hale, William Richardson (keyboards);
- Frank Felix, Viktor Krauss (bass);
- Frank Tontoh, Geoff Dunn, Larry Atamanuik (drums);
- Scooter Delong (percussion);
- Richard Bull, Tony White (programming).
