= Sounds of St. Lucia: Live =

Live album by Acoustic Alchemy
- Released: 11 March 2003
- Recorded: 2000
- Venue: St. Lucia Jazz Festival
- Genre: Smooth jazz
- Length: 71:55
- Label: Image Entertainment; 3513
- Producer: Paxton Baker; Derek Lewis; Bill Plummer

Acoustic Alchemy chronology
AArt (2001)	Sounds of St. Lucia: Live (2003)	Radio Contact (2003)

Sounds of St. Lucia: Live is a live album released by Image Entertainment, on both CD and DVD, of a performance by Acoustic Alchemy at the tenth St. Lucia Jazz Festival in 2000.

The band line-up on this album consists of Greg Carmichael (nylon guitar), Miles Gilderdale (steel guitar), Frank Felix (bass), Tony White (keyboards) and Richard Brook (drums).

The DVD version is released in Dolby Digital 5.1 Surround Sound and contains two additional tracks not on the CD: "Catalina Kiss" and "Casino". "Catalina Kiss" is the lead in and "Casino" is the lead out song of the DVD. Both show scenic views of St. Lucia. Excluding these two extra tracks, the song order is identical with the exception of "Trail Blazer" and "Red Dust & Spanish Lace".

== Track listings ==
=== CD ===
#	title	Writers	Duration
1	"Trail Blazer"	Gilderdale/Parsons-Morris/Carmichael	6:06
2	"Playing For Time"	Webb/Carmichael/Parsons-Morris	6:26
3	"Angel of the South"	Gilderdale/Carmichael	7:18
4	"The Beautiful Game"	Disley/Carmichael	5:24
5	"Viva Ché"	Carmichael/Gilderdale/Felix	4:15
6	"Cool As A Rule"	Webb/Carmichael	4:17
7	"Red Dust and Spanish Lace"	Webb/Carmichael/Parsons-Morris	4:40
8	"Flamoco Loco"	Carmichael/Gilderdale	7:54
9	"The Wind of Change"	Carmichael/Gilderdale/White	2:34
10	"Augusträsse 18"	Webb/Carmichael/Parsons-Morris/Gilderdale	7:01
11	"The Panama Cat"	Felix/Gilderdale/Carmichael	8:46
12	"Lazeez"	Webb/Carmichael/Parsons-Morris	6:52

=== DVD ===
#	title	Writers	DVD Time Indices	Duration
1	"Catalina Kiss"	Webb/Carmichael/Parsons-Morris	0:07 – 4:37	4:30
2	"Playing For Time"	Webb/Carmichael/Parsons-Morris	5:40 – 11:45	6:05
3	"Angel of the South"	Gilderdale/Carmichael	13:05 – 20:12	7:07
4	"The Beautiful Game"	Disley/Carmichael	21:21 – 26:31	5:10
5	"Trail Blazer"	Gilderdale/Parsons-Morris/Carmichael	26:46 – 32:35	5:49
6	Viva Ché	Carmichael/Gilderdale/Felix	34:10 – 38:19	4:09
7	"Cool as a Rule"	Webb/Carmichael	43:28 – 47:31	4:03
8	"Flamoco Loco"	Carmichael/Gilderdale	47:41 – 55:24	7:43
9	"The Wind of Change"	CarmichaelGilderdale/White	55:43 – 58:05	2:22
10	"Augustasse 18"	Webb/Carmichael/Parsons-Morris/Gilderdale	1:00:25 – 1:07:16	6:51
11	"Panama Cat"	Felix/Gilderdale/Carmichael	1:08:50 – 1:18:02	9:12
12	"Lazeez"	Webb/Carmichael/Parsons-Morris	1:19:03 – 1:25:16	6:13
13	"Red Dust & Spanish Lace"	Webb/Carmichael/Parsons-Morris	1:26:32 – 1:30:48	4:16
14	"Casino"	Webb/James	1:31:07 – 1:36:28	7:21
