= Reference Point =

Studio album by Acoustic Alchemy
- Released: August 7, 1990
- Recorded: 1990
- Studio: Hansa-Haus Studios (Bonn, Germany)
- Genre: Smooth jazz
- Length: 38:03
- Label: GRP 9614
- Producer: John Parsons

Acoustic Alchemy chronology
Blue Chip (1989)	Reference Point (1990)	Back on the Case (1991)

Professional ratings
Review scores
Source	Rating
AllMusic	3/5 stars

Released in 1990, Reference Point is the first album by Acoustic Alchemy released for jazz label GRP and their fourth album overall. The song "Caravan of Dreams" was nominated for a Grammy Award in 1990 for Best New Age Performance.

Containing some of the band's more popular tracks, such as the title track "Reference Point", "Same Road, Same Reason" and "Cuban Heels", the nine-track album is also the only album by the band to offer a cover track: "Take Five".

== Awards ==
32nd Annual Grammy Awards

Year	Nominee / work	Award	Result
1990	"Caravan of Dreams"	Best New Age Performance	Nominated

== Track listing ==
No.	Title	Writer(s)	Length
1.	"Reference Point"	Nick Webb; Greg Carmichael; John Parsons	4:30
2.	"Missing Your Touch"	Nick Webb; Greg Carmichael; John Parsons	4:40
3.	"Take Five"	Paul Desmond	4:35
4.	"Same Road, Same Reason"	Greg Carmichael	4:49
5.	"Make My Day"	Greg Carmichael	4:08
6.	"Caravan of Dreams"	Nick Webb; Simon James	2:55
7.	"Homecoming"	Nick Webb; Greg Carmichael; John Parsons	5:30
8.	"Cuban Heels"	Greg Carmichael	3:25
9.	"Lullaby for the First Born"	Nick Webb; Greg Carmichael	3:31
Total length:			38:03

== Personnel ==
Acoustic Alchemy

- Greg Carmichael – nylon guitars
- Nick Webb – steel-string guitars, nylon guitar (3)

Additional musicians

- Terry Disley – keyboards (1–8)
- Klaus Sperber – bass guitar (1, 2, 4, 5, 7, 8)
- Bert Smaak – drums (1, 4, 5, 7, 8)
- Mario Argandoña – percussion (1–5, 7, 8)
- Serge Maillard – Roland 808 programming (2), programming (3)
- John Parsons – Roland 808 programming (2), programming (3), steel-string guitar (4)
- Ludwig Götz – trombone (3, 5)

== Production ==
- John Parsons – producer, mixing
- Klaus Genuit – recording, mixing
- Joseph Doughney – digital editing, post-production
- Michael Landy – digital editing, post-production
- The Review Room (New York City, New York, USA) – digital editing and post-production location
- Ted Jensen – mastering at Sterling Sound (New York, NY, USA)
- Suzanne Sherman – GRP production coordinator
- Andy Baltimore – GRP creative director
- David Gibb – graphic design
- Jacki McCarthy – graphic design
- Andy Ruggirello – graphic design
- Dan Serrano – graphic design
- Keith Russell – art direction
- Kevin Calvert – photography
- Stewart Coxhead for The Art and Music Corporation, Ltd. – management
