= American/English =

Studio album by Acoustic Alchemy
- Released: 29 March 2005 (United States); 11 April 2005 (UK)
- Recorded: 2005 at: Higher Ground Studios, London, UK; Hansa Haus Studios, Bonn, Germany
- Genre: Smooth jazz
- Length: 48:45
- Label: Higher Octave Music; 72435-79755-2-0
- Producer: Richard Bull; Greg Carmichael; Miles Gilderdale

Acoustic Alchemy chronology
Radio Contact (2003)	American/English (2005)	This Way (2007)

Professional ratings
Review scores
Source	Rating
Allmusic	4/5 stars

American/English is Acoustic Alchemy's fourth album release on the Higher Octave Music label, and contains eleven tracks, making it also their shortest album with the label to date.

The album was preceded by single "Say Yeah" for smooth jazz radio in the USA, an offering in a hip-hop style, remarked by some to be similar in style to British urban singer-songwriter Craig David. Experimental attributes include digital processing on Carmichael's guitar, which 'cut off' the ends of each note, and scat style vocals from Gilderdale toward the end of the track.

Other highlights include "The Detroit Shuffle", reminiscent of 1989's "Catalina Kiss" from the "Blue Chip" album. The track fused a vibrant melody with the shuffle rhythm which helped seal the band's popularity in the genre towards the end of the 1980s.

This is the first of Acoustic Alchemy's albums to include EMI's Copy Control technique, designed to prevent illegal reproduction and audio ripping of the disc. Such controls only exist on the commercial release of the album; the "promo only" copies do not contain any copy protection, but carry an FBI Anti-Piracy warning.

== Track listing ==
#	Title	Writers	Duration
1	"The Crossing"	Carmichael/Gilderdale	4:42
2	"Say Yeah"	Carmichael/Gilderdale	3:39
3	"So Kylie"	Carmichael/Gilderdale	4:22
4	"Trinity"	Carmichael/Gilderdale	4:41
5	"The Detroit Shuffle"	Carmichael/Gilderdale	4:29
6	"Cherry Hill"	Carmichael/Gilderdale	3:27
7	"She Speaks American/English"	Carmichael/Gilderdale	4:44
8	"Lilac Lane"	Carmichael/Gilderdale/Norton	4:49
9	"The 14 Carrot Café"	Carmichael/Gilderdale/Norton	4:09
10	"Get Up (Levantar y Bailar)"	Carmichael/Gilderdale	3:57
11	"The Moon and the Sun"	Carmichael/Gilderdale/White	5:39

== Singles ==
1. "Say Yeah"
2. "Trinity"
