= Radio Contact =

Studio album by Acoustic Alchemy
- Released: 24 June 2003
- Recorded: 2003
- Studio: Hansa Haus Studios, Bonn, Germany; Green Nun Studios, Brighton, UK
- Genre: Smooth jazz
- Length: 60:02
- Label: Higher Octave Music; 84283
- Producer: Maria Ehrenreich; Greg Carmichael; Miles Gilderdale

Acoustic Alchemy chronology
Sounds of St. Lucia: Live (2003)	Radio Contact (2003)	American/English (2005)

Radio Contact is the thirteenth album by Acoustic Alchemy. Comprising thirteen tracks and led off by the single "No Messin'", the album features input from fellow guitarist Chuck Loeb on two tracks.

The album is the band's first to contain a full vocal track, "Little Laughter", performed by Jo Harrop. The track "Ya Tebya Lubliu" was so named after the Russian phrase for "I Love You".

== Track listing ==
#	Title	Writers	Duration
1	"No Messin'"	Carmichael/Gilderdale	5:36
2	"Milo"	Carmichael/Gilderdale/White	4:49
3	"Shelter Island Drive"	Carmichael/Gilderdale/Norton	5:55
4	"Urban Cowboy"	Carmichael/Gilderdale	4:07
5	"El Camino Del Corazon"	Carmichael/Gilderdale	5:11
6	"Little Laughter"	Carmichael/Gilderdale/Harrop/Russel/Walling	5:42
7	"Tinderbox"	Carmichael/Gilderdale/Norton	4:15
8	"What Comes Around..."	Carmichael/Gilderdale/White	4:29
9	"Coffee With Manni"	Carmichael/Gilderdale	2:49
10	"Shoestring"	Carmichael/Gilderdale/Norton	5:21
11	"Turn The Stars On"	Carmichael/Gilderdale/Norton	4:34
12	"Ya Tebya Lubliu"	Carmichael/Gilderdale/Norton	3:01
13	"Venus Morena"	Carmichael/Gilderdale/Coldrick/Felix	4:13

== Singles ==
1. "No Messin'"
