= The New Edge =

Studio album by Acoustic Alchemy
- Released: 16 March 1993
- Recorded: 1993
- Studio: Hansa-Haus Studios (Bonn, Germany); Lansdowne Studios (London, UK); Sound Emporium Studios (Nashville, Tennessee, USA); Middle Tennessee State University (Murfreesboro, Tennessee, USA)
- Genre: Smooth jazz
- Length: 44:18
- Label: GRP 9711
- Producer: Steven Jones

Acoustic Alchemy chronology
Early Alchemy (1992)	The New Edge (1993)	Against the Grain (1994)

Professional ratings
Review scores
Source	Rating
AllMusic	4.5/5 stars

The New Edge is the seventh album by Acoustic Alchemy, released on 16 March 1993. The album is critically regarded as one of Acoustic Alchemy's better albums, despite only having one track, "Cool as a Rule", on their standard set-list.

There are two different versions of the album. The New Edge was released with an extra track on the European release. The eleventh track, "Act of Innocence", was written in three time. This extends the total length of the disc to 47 minutes.

== Track listing ==
#	Title	Writers	Duration
1	"Oceans Apart"	Nick Webb/Greg Carmichael/John Parsons	5:36
2	"The Notting Hill Two-Step"	Webb/Carmichael/Parsons	3:49
3	"Slow Ride Home"	Webb/Carmichael	4:10
4	"Cool As A Rule"	Webb/Carmichael	3:47
5	"Santa Café"	Webb/Carmichael/Parsons	4:24
6	"Arc En Ciel"	Webb/Carmichael	3:19
7	"London Skyline"	Webb/Carmichael/Parsons	6:01
8	"The Liaison"	Webb/Carmichael/Parsons	5:14
9	"Until Always"	Parsons	4:52
10	"Rive Gauche"	Webb/Carmichael	3:06
11	"Act Of Innocence"	Webb/Carmichael	3:09 (Extra Track)

== Personnel ==
Acoustic Alchemy

- Nick Webb – steel-string guitars (1–8, 10), nylon guitar (1), 12-string guitar (1–3), sitar guitar (2)
- Greg Carmichael – steel-string guitars (1, 3), nylon guitars

Additional musicians

- Terry Disley – keyboards (1, 2, 4, 7–9), accordion (10)
- Glen Keiles – programming (6)
- Rainer Brüninghaus – keyboards (7, 9)
- Jerry Douglas – dobro (3)
- The Diego Brothers – rhythm guitars (10)
- Patrick Bettison – bass guitar (1, 4, 7–9)
- Dave Pomeroy – bass guitar (3)
- Gunnar Plümer – double bass (5, 10)
- Dan Tomlinson – drums (1, 2, 4, 7–9)
- Mario Argandoña – percussion (1–5, 7, 9), vocals (4), handclaps (5), drums (10)
- Sam Bacco – percussion (3)
- Caroline Dale – cello (1, 2, 7)
- Derrick James – saxophone (4, 9)

Orchestra on "Arc En Ciel"

- Barrington Pheloung – orchestral arrangements and conductor
- John Anderson – Cor anglais, oboe
- Caroline Dale, Caroline Dearnley and Anthony Pleeth – cello
- Chris Laurence and Sara Loewenthal – double bass
- Levine Andrade, Andy Brown and Garfield Jackson – viola
- Pauline Lowbury, Rita Manning, Jim McLeod, Maciej Rakowski, Konstantin Stoianov and Cathy Thompson – violin

== Production ==
- Greg Carmichael – executive producer
- Nick Webb – executive producer
- Steven Jones – producer, mixing, engineer (3)
- Klaus Genuit – engineer (1, 2, 4–10), mixing
- Dave Sinko – engineer (3)
- Randy LeRoy – sequencing at Final Stage Mastering (Nashville, Tennessee, USA)
- Joseph Doughney – post-production
- Michael Landy – post-production
- Adam Zelinka – post-production
- The Review Room (New York City, New York, USA) – post-production location
- Denny Purcell – mastering at Georgetown Masters (Nashville, Tennessee, USA)
- Michael Pollard – GRP production coordinator
- Diane Dragonette – production coordinating assistant
- Sonny Mediana – GRP production director
- Sharon Franklin – production directing assistant
- Andy Baltimore – GRP creative director
- Alba Acevedo – graphic design
- Scott Johnson – graphic design
- Jackie Salway – graphic design
- Dan Serrano – graphic design
- Artbeat Graphic Designs – cover design
- Craig Oddy – cover photography
- Terry Disley – band photography
- Ruthie Teague – band photography
- Stewart Coxhead for The Art and Music Corporation Ltd. – management
