= Natural Elements (Acoustic Alchemy album) =

Studio album by Acoustic Alchemy
- Released: March 7, 1988
- Recorded: 1988
- Studio: Hansa-Haus Studios (Bonn, Germany)
- Genre: Smooth jazz
- Length: 34:21
- Label: MCA 42125; GRP 9834 (1996 re-release)
- Producer: John Parsons

Acoustic Alchemy chronology
Red Dust & Spanish Lace (1987)	Natural Elements (1988)	Blue Chip (1989)

Natural Elements was the second major label release by Acoustic Alchemy from 1988. The shortest of all of the band's albums, only comprising eight tracks, Natural Elements set out to show what the title suggests: the organic side to Acoustic Alchemy's music.

Points to note from this album include the title track, Natural Elements, which became the theme tune to long-running BBC gardening show, Gardener's World, and the re-recording of an early track, "Casino", now re-arranged to include piano and full percussion parts. The track "Ballad For Kay" is dedicated to Nick Webb's wife, Kay.

== Critical reception ==
Professional ratings
Review scores
Source	Rating
AllMusic	3/5 stars

Stewart Mason of AllMusic begins his review with, "Not quite complex enough to be jazz, not quite mellow or ambient enough to be new age, and just a little too cerebral to just be pop music, Acoustic Alchemy's Natural Elements is its own little oddity."

While doing an article on Acoustic Alchemy, Dirk Sutro of The Los Angeles Times wrote, "Americans love the rich acoustic music of Acoustic Alchemy. The British band has sold more than 100,000 copies each of its albums "Red Dust & Spanish Lace" and "Natural Elements" in the United States."

== Track listing ==
All tracks are written by Greg Carmichael and Nick Webb, unless otherwise noted.

No.	Title	Writer(s)	Length
1.	"Drake's Drum"		4:45
2.	"Overnight Sleeper"		3:35
3.	"Natural Elements"		3:51
4.	"Casino"	Nick Webb; Simon James	3:48
5.	"If Only"		5:08
6.	"Ballad for Kay"	Nick Webb	2:56
7.	"Evil the Weasel"	John Parsons	5:34
8.	"Late Night Duke Street"		4:44
Total length:			34:21

== Musicians ==
Acoustic Alchemy

- Nick Webb – nylon guitars, steel guitars
- Greg Carmichael – nylon guitars

Additional musicians

- Mike Herting – keyboards, synthesizers
- Rainer Brüninghaus – acoustic piano, synthesizers
- Serge Maillard – programming
- John Parsons – programming
- Konrad Mathieu – bass
- Bert Smaak – drums
- Mario Argandoña – percussion
- Vera Elfert – recorder

== Production ==
- John Parsons – producer
- Klaus Genuit – engineer
- Günther Kasper – acoustic piano recording at Sound Studio N (Köln, Germany)
- Manfred Struck – mixing at Fairland Studio (Bochum, Germany)
- Milan Bogdan – digital editing
- Benny Quinn – mastering at Masterfonics (Nashville, Tennessee, USA)
- Simon Levy – art direction
- Virginia Team – design
- Ashley Jackson – front cover painting
- Paul Cox – back cover photography
- Stewart Coxhead for Bullet Management, Ltd. – management

Track information and credits adapted from the album's liner notes.
