= Against the Grain (Acoustic Alchemy album) =

Against The Grain

Studio album by Acoustic Alchemy
- Released: 11 October 1994
- Recorded: 1994
- Studio: Mayfair Studios and Winsford Studios (London, UK) Hansa Haus Studios (Bonn, Germany)
- Genre: Smooth jazz
- Length: 53:19
- Label: GRP 97832
- Producer: Steven Jones Klaus Genuit

Acoustic Alchemy chronology
The New Edge (1993)	Against The Grain (1994)	Arcanum (1996)

Professional ratings
Review scores
Source	Rating
AllMusic	2/5 stars

Against The Grain, Acoustic Alchemy's 8th album, was released on 11 October 1994 under the GRP label.

Despite having only ten tracks, Against the Grain manages to notch up a total play time of 53 minutes because of the band's experimentation with some longer, more drawn out tracks.

The most successful effort from this release was "Lazeez", one of two tracks from this album to appear on the compilation album, "The Very Best Of Acoustic Alchemy" (2002).

== Track listing ==
#	Title	Writers	Duration
1	"Against The Grain"	Iain McArthur/Nick Webb/Greg Carmichael/John Parsons	5:39
2	"Lazeez"	Webb/Carmichael/Parsons	4:54
3	"A Different Kind of Freedom"	Webb/Carmichael/Parsons	6:20
4	"Lady Lynda"	Webb/Carmichael/Parsons	5:22
5	"Road Dogs"	Webb/Carmichael/Parsons	4:19
6	"Shoot The Loop"	McArthur/Webb/Carmichael	5:19
7	"Across The Golden Gate"	Webb/Carmichael/Parsons	5:12
8	"Papillon"	Webb/Carmichael	6:39
9	"Silent Partner"	Webb/Carmichael	4:30
10	"Nouveau Tango"	Webb/Carmichael/Parsons	5:05

== Personnel ==
Acoustic Alchemy

- Nick Webb – steel-string guitars, 12-string guitar (5)
- Greg Carmichael – nylon guitars

Additional musicians

- Rainer Brüninghaus – acoustic piano (1, 2, 4, 8, 10), keyboards (3, 4, 8)
- Iain McArthur – programming (1, 6)
- Terry Disley – keyboards (4, 9)
- Mike Herting – keyboards (7)
- John Parsons – dobro (1), electric guitars (3, 6, 10), steel-string guitar (6)
- Jerry Douglas – dobro (5, 7)
- Paul Harriman – bass (2–5, 7–10)
- Bert Smaak – drums (2–5, 7, 8, 10)
- Luís Jardim – percussion (2–5, 7, 9, 10)
- Phil Todd – flute (3), soprano saxophone (3, 8), tenor saxophone (3)

== Production ==
- Greg Carmichael – executive producer, liner notes
- Nick Webb – executive producer, liner notes
- Steven Jones – producer, engineer, mixing
- Klaus Genuit – co-producer, engineer, mixing
- Richard Battaglia – additional engineer
- Oggie Skinner – additional engineer
- Randy LeRoy – digital editing at Final Stage Mastering (Nashville, Tennessee, USA)
- Joseph Doughney – post-production
- Michael Landy – post-production
- The Review Room (New York City, New York, USA) – post-production location
- Denny Purcell – mastering at Georgetown Masters (Nashville, Tennessee, USA)
- Cara Bridgins – GRP production coordinator
- Joseph Moore – production coordinating assistant
- Sonny Mediana – GRP production director, art direction
- Lilian Barbuti – production directing assistant
- Andy Baltimore – GRP creative director
- Laurie Goldman – art direction
- Chet Snedden – front cover photography
- Norman M. Castillo – photography
- Stewart Coxhead for The Art and Music Corporation, Ltd. – management
