= Positive Thinking... =

Studio album by Acoustic Alchemy
- Released: 19 May 1998
- Recorded: 1997–1998
- Studio: The Manor House (Monkton Combe, UK); Hansa-Haus Studio (Bonn, Germany)
- Genre: Smooth jazz
- Length: 52:11
- Label: GRP; 9907
- Producer: Steven Jones Greg Carmichael

Acoustic Alchemy chronology
Arcanum (1996)	Positive Thinking... (1998)	The Beautiful Game (2000)

Professional ratings
Review scores
Source	Rating
AllMusic	4/5 stars
Record Mirror	9/10

Positive Thinking... is the tenth and final album recorded by Acoustic Alchemy for GRP, released on May 19, 1998.

It marks a milestone in the band's history not only for the change of record company, but for the loss of founding member Nick Webb, who died during the recording of this album. His name appears in the credits for having contributed to every song, however Webb's parts in the recordings were done by longstanding sideman John Parsons.

Current steel string guitarist Miles Gilderdale contributes to two songs on this album.

The song "Augustrasse 18" is titled after the address of the Hansahaus-Studios in Bonn, Germany (actually written Auguststraße) where Acoustic Alchemy recorded numerous albums under producer John Parsons.

== Track listing ==
#	Title	Writers	Duration
1	"Passionelle"	Webb/Carmichael	4:40
2	"Rainwatching W.I."	Webb/Carmichael	4:42
3	"Cadaqués"	Webb/Carmichael	5:49
4	"The Five Card Trick"	Webb/Carmichael/Parsons	5:10
5	"Positive Thinking"	Webb/Carmichael/Dale	4:21
6	"The Better Shoes"	Webb/Carmichael/Parsons	5:27
7	"Vapour Trails"	Webb/Carmichael/Parsons	4:29
8	"Augustrasse 18"	Webb/Carmichael/Gilderdale/Parsons	6:46
9	"Time Gentlemen Please"	Webb/Carmichael	4:37
10	"Limited Excess"	Webb/Carmichael/Gilderdale/Parsons	6:10

== Personnel ==
Acoustic Alchemy

- Greg Carmichael – steel string guitars, nylon guitars
- Miles Gilderdale – programming, electric guitars
- Nick Webb – composition, arrangements, inspiration
- John Parsons – electric guitars, steel string guitars
- Dennis Murphy – bass guitar
- John Sheppard – drums

With:

- Rainer Brüninghaus – keyboards
- Mario Argandoña – percussion
- Caroline Dale – cello, string arrangements

=== Production ===
- Greg Carmichael – producer
- Steven Jones – producer, engineer, mixing
- DRS – recording
- Klaus Genuit – mixing
- Randy LeRoy – mastering at Final Stage Mastering (Nashville, Tennessee, USA)
- Porl Ferguson – sleeve design
- Linda Schwab – sleeve design, conceptual artwork
- Wellcome Institute (London) – cover photography
- Stewart Coxhead for The Art & Music Corporation, Ltd. – management
