= Early Alchemy =

Jazz compilation

Compilation album by Acoustic Alchemy
- Released: 16 March 1992
- Recorded: 1982–1990
- Studio: Wave, London, UK; Hansa Haus, Bonn, Germany
- Genre: Smooth jazz
- Length: 44:54
- Label: GRP 9666
- Producer: Nick Webb

Acoustic Alchemy chronology
Back on the Case (1991)	Early Alchemy (1992)	The New Edge (1993)

Professional ratings
Review scores
Source	Rating
AllMusic	3/5 stars

Early Alchemy is a compilation album by Acoustic Alchemy produced by band member Nick Webb and their sixth album overall, released on 16 March 1992. It was put together from old recordings and outtakes by Webb and Simon James, to give insight into the progression of the band's music.

The album contains the original recordings of "Sarah Victoria" and "Casino", successful Acoustic Alchemy songs co-written by James. The instrumental make-up of the band includes a double bass, percussionist and string quartet (the Violettes) backing up the sound of the dual acoustic guitars.

== Track listing ==
#	Title	Writers	Duration
1	"Santiago"	Webb	4:20
2	"Sarah Victoria"	Webb	1:56
3	"Last Summer Song"	Webb/Clyne	3:22
4	"Slap It Down"	Webb	2:39
5	"Sira's Song"	Webb	3:39
6	"Moonstone"	Webb/James	1:48
7	"Wind It Up"	Webb/Clyne/Twigg	4:03
8	"Casino"	Webb/James	3:18
9	"Little Bercheres"	Webb	4:40
10	"Amanecer"	James	3:06
11	"Waiting For You"	Webb	3:25
12	"Return Flight"	Webb	3:23
13	"Daybreak"	James	2:56
14	"A Dream Of Fair Women"	Webb/James	2:19

== Personnel ==
- Mario Argandoña – percussion, sound effects, finger snaps
- Andy Baltimore – creative director
- Francis Bucknall – cello
- Mike Caldwell – photography
- Jeff Clyne – bass, composer, double bass
- Joseph Doughney – producer, digital editing, post production
- John Earls – violin
- Klaus Genuit – engineer, remixing
- David Gibb – design
- Katy Hull – violin
- Martin Humbey – viola
- Simon James – guitar, composer, guitar (steel)
- Ted Jensen – mastering
- Scott Johnson – design
- Doreen Kalcich – assistant producer
- Michael Landy – producer, digital editing, post production
- Ron Mathewson – double bass
- Ron Mathewson – bass
- Sonny Mediana – design
- John O'Keeny – percussion, conductor, vibraphone
- John Parsons – percussion, guitar (steel), sound effects, engineer, finger snaps, remixing
- Michael Pollard – production coordination
- Andy Ruggirello – design
- Dan Serrano – design
- Rod Shone – photography
- Klaus Sperber – bass
- Trevor Tomkins – percussion
- The Violettes – strings
- Nick Webb – composer, guitar (steel), producer, engineer, liner notes, remixing
- Gareth Winters – cover design
- Adam Zelinka – producer, digital editing, post production
