= Arcanum (album) =

Studio album by Acoustic Alchemy
- Released: 18 June 1996
- Recorded: 1996
- Studio: Pinewood Studios (London, UK); Hausa-Haus Studio (Bonn, Germany)
- Genre: Smooth jazz
- Length: 53:29
- Label: GRP 9848
- Producer: Steven Jones

Acoustic Alchemy chronology
Against the Grain (1994)	Arcanum (1996)	Positive Thinking... (1998)

Professional ratings
Review scores
Source	Rating
AllMusic	4.5/5 stars

Arcanum (stylized as a͡rcānˈum on the cover) is the ninth album by Acoustic Alchemy, released on June 18, 1996. It would be their penultimate release on the GRP jazz label.

The production on this album differed from normal; the band recorded the disc live at Pinewood Film Studios, London, UK. They enlisted the help of the London Metropolitan Orchestra to provide backing.

The album contained twelve tracks, three of which were new ("Columbia", "Chance Meeting" and "Something She Said"), and the others re-recordings of tracks selected from the band's discography to this point.

Footage from some of the recording of this album appears on the GRP video release, "Best Kept Secret" (VHS 1998, DVD 2006).

== Track listing ==
#	Title	Writers	Duration
1	"Columbia"	Webb/Carmichael	4:48
2	"Homecoming"	Webb/Carmichael/Parsons	5:40
3	"Chance Meeting"	Webb/Carmichael	3:48
4	"Lazeez"	Webb/Carmichael/Parsons	5:49
5	"Mr. Chow"	Webb/Carmichael/Parsons	3:13
6	"Same Road, Same Reason"	Webb/Carmichael	4:14
7	"Casino"	Webb/James	6:06
8	"Something She Said"	Webb/Carmichael/Parsons	3:55
9	"Jamaica Heartbeat"	Webb/Carmichael/Parsons	3:53
10	"Catalina Kiss"	Webb/Carmichael/Parsons	4:21
11	"Reference Point"	Webb/Carmichael/Parsons	4:21
12	"Hearts In Chains"	Webb/Carmichael	3:21

== Personnel ==
Acoustic Alchemy

- Greg Carmichael – acoustic nylon guitars
- Nick Webb – steel string acoustic guitars
- John Parsons – acoustic guitars, electric guitars
- Dennis Murphy – bass guitar
- John Shepard – drums
- Mario Argandoña – percussion

The London Metropolitan Orchestra

- Caroline Dale – cello, string arrangements
- David Daniels – cello
- Andy Brown – viola
- Yuko Inoue – viola
- Rosemary Furniss – violin
- Elizabeth Layton – violin
- Cathy Thompson – violin
- Jeremy Williams – violin

=== Production ===
- Steven Jones – producer, engineer, mixing
- Klaus Genuit – engineer, mixing
- Randy LeRoy – digital editing at Final Stage Mastering (Nashville, Tennessee, USA)
- Denny Purcell – mastering at Georgetown Masters (Nashville, Tennessee, USA)
- John Shepard – art direction
- Laurie Goldman – graphic design
- Linda Schwab – artwork, CD illustrations
- Craig Oddy – photography
- Stewart Coxhead for The Art and Music Coorporation, Ltd. – management
