= Natural elements =

Natural elements or Natural Elements may refer to:

== In science ==
- Chemical elements that are not synthesised
- Classical element, the concept in ancient Greece of earth, water, air or fire
- Isotopic abundance, the relative amounts of isotopes of a chemical element
- Abundance of the chemical elements, the relative occurrence of chemical elements

== In entertainment ==
- Natural Elements (Acoustic Alchemy album), 1988
- Natural Elements (Shakti album), 1977
- Natural Elements (hip hop group), an underground group from New York City
