= The Beautiful Game (disambiguation) =

The phrase "The Beautiful Game" is a synonym for association football.

The Beautiful Game may also refer to:

- The Beautiful Game, also known as The Match, a 2001 film
- The Beautiful Game (2012 film), a documentary film about association football in Africa
- The Beautiful Game (2024 film), a British film directed by Thea Sharrock
- The Beautiful Game (musical), a musical by Andrew Lloyd Webber and Ben Elton
- The Beautiful Game (Acoustic Alchemy album), the tenth full-length album by an English smooth jazz band Acoustic Alchemy
- The Beautiful Game (compilation album), a multi-artist album released in 1996 to commemorate the UEFA Euro 1996 football cup.
- Beautiful Game Studios, a computer game development studio based in London
- The Beautiful Game, a 2016 album by American band Vulfpeck
- The Beautiful Game, a 2021 song by Mirror
- The 2013–14 San Antonio Spurs, nicknamed "The Beautiful Game"
