= Back on the Case =

Studio album by Acoustic Alchemy
- Released: 13 August 1991
- Recorded: 1991
- Studio: Hansa Haus Studios (Bonn, Germany)
- Genre: Smooth jazz
- Length: 48:01
- Label: GRP 9648
- Producer: Greg Carmichael; Nick Webb; Klaus Genuit

Acoustic Alchemy chronology
| Reference Point (1990) | Back on the Case (1991) | Early Alchemy (1992) |

Professional ratings
Review scores
| Source | Rating |
|---|---|
| AllMusic | 4/5 stars |

Back on the Case is the fifth studio album by Acoustic Alchemy, released on August 13, 1991. The first four tracks all appear on the band's 2002 compilation album, The Very Best of Acoustic Alchemy. It is the second album by the band to feature pianist Terry Disley.

== Track listing ==
| # | Title | Writers | Duration |
|---|---|---|---|
| 1 | "The Alchemist" | Webb/Carmichael | 3:54 |
| 2 | "Jamaica Heartbeat" | Webb/Carmichael/Parsons | 5:31 |
| 3 | "Georgia Peach" | Webb/Carmichael/Parsons | 4:23 |
| 4 | "Playing For Time" | Webb/Carmichael/Parsons | 6:05 |
| 5 | "When The Lights Go Out" | Webb/Parsons | 4:36 |
| 6 | "Clear Air For Miles" | Webb/Carmichael/Disley | 6:34 |
| 7 | "Fire Of The Heart" | Webb/Carmichael/Parsons/Disley | 4:06 |
| 8 | "Freeze Frame" | Webb/Carmichael/Parsons | 4:02 |
| 9 | "On The Case" | Webb/Carmichael/Parsons | 3:57 |
| 10 | "Break For The Border" | Webb/Carmichael/Parsons | 4:53 |

== Personnel ==
Acoustic Alchemy

- Nick Webb – steel-string guitars (1–6, 8, 10), sitar guitar (2), electric guitars (3), 6-string guitar (9), 12-string guitar (9)
- Greg Carmichael – nylon guitars (1–4, 6–10), steel-string guitars (3, 9)

Additional musicians

- Terry Disley – keyboards, synth bass (6)
- Patrick Bettison – bass (1–5, 7, 8, 10)
- Abe White – bass (9)
- Dan Tomlinson – cymbals (1), drums (2–10)
- Mario Argandoña – percussion, vocals (4), handclaps (7)
- Randy Brecker – trumpet (2), flugelhorn (7)
- "Little" Terry Dee – harmonica (9)

== Production ==
- Greg Carmichael – producer
- Nick Webb – producer
- Klaus Genuit – producer, recording, mixing
- Joseph Doughney – digital editing, post-production
- Michael Landy – digital editing, post-production
- The Review Room (New York City, New York, USA) – digital editing and post-production location
- Ted Jensen – mastering at Sterling Sound (New York, NY, USA)
- Michelle Lewis – GRP production coordinator
- Craig Oddy – sleeve photography
- Andy Baltimore – GRP creative director
- David Gibb – graphic design
- Scott Johnson – graphic design
- Sonny Mediana – graphic design
- Andy Ruggirello – graphic design
- Dan Serrano – graphic design
- Stewart Coxhead for The Art and Music Corporation, Ltd. – management
