= This Way (Acoustic Alchemy album) =

Studio album by Acoustic Alchemy
- Released: 14 May 2007
- Recorded: 2006
- Studios: Higher Ground Studios, London, UK; Hansa Haus Studios, Bonn, Germany
- Genre: Smooth jazz
- Length: 54:49
- Labels: Narada Jazz; TBC
- Producer: TBC

Acoustic Alchemy chronology
American/English (2005)	This Way (2007)

Professional ratings
Review scores
Source	Rating
Allmusic	4/5 stars

This Way is an album by Acoustic Alchemy, released on 14 May 2007 in the United Kingdom. It was released on 6 June 2007 in the United States. The album was their first to be released on Narada Jazz.

On 4 February 2007, Acoustic Alchemy announced that they had completed recording the new album, comprising eleven tracks. It features special guest appearances from trumpeter Rick Braun (on the track "Carlos The King"), saxophonist Jeff Kashiwa (on "Egg"), and collaborations with label-mates Down to the Bone.

== Track listing ==
#	Title	Writers	Duration
1	"Love Is All There Is"	Carmichael/Gilderdale	4:22
2	"Ernie"	Carmichael/Gilderdale	6:34
3	"Who Knows"	Carmichael/Gilderdale/White	3:56
4	"Slampop"	Carmichael/Gilderdale	4:47
5	"Out of Nowhere"	Carmichael/Gilderdale	3:38
6	"This Way"	Carmichael/Gilderdale	4:41
7	"Tied Up with String"	Carmichael/Gilderdale	5:12
8	"Only in My Dreams"	Carmichael/Gilderdale	5:52
9	"Carlos the King"	Carmichael/Gilderdale	5:52
10	"Egg"	Carmichael/Gilderdale/White	5:11
11	"Now I'm on My Way"	Carmichael/Gilderdale	4:44

== Musicians ==
- Greg Carmichael - nylon string guitar
- Miles Gilderdale - steel string guitar, electric guitar, programming, vocals, backing vocals
- Paul Harriman - bass (4)
- John Goldsby - bass (7)
- Julian Crampton - bass (9, 10)
- Neil Cowley - Wurlitzer organ (1, 8, 11); piano (1, 8, 9)
- Terry Disley - piano (2)
- Mike Herling - piano (4, 7)
- Greg Grainger - drums (2, 9, 10); percussion (2, 9); vocals (1); backing vocals (8, 11)
- Bert Smaak - drums (4, 7)
- Fred White - trumpet (1–3, 7, 10); Fender Rhodes electric piano (3, 10)
- Kevin Robinson - trumpet (2, 3, 10); flugelhorn (3)
- Dennis Rollins - trombone (2)
- Rick Braun - flugelhorn (9)
- Snake Davis - alto saxophone (1, 2, 10); saxophones (7); baritone saxophone (10)
- Jeff Kashiwa - tenor saxophone (2, 10)
- Richard Bull - add. programming (1–3, 9)
