= Blue Chip (album) =

Studio album by Acoustic Alchemy
- Released: November 1989
- Recorded: August–November 1989
- Studio: Hansa-Haus Studios (Bonn, Germany)
- Genre: Smooth jazz
- Length: 43:54
- Label: MCA 6291; GRP 9837 (1996 re-release)
- Producer: John Parsons

Acoustic Alchemy chronology
Natural Elements (1988)	Blue Chip (1989)	Reference Point (1990)

Professional ratings
Review scores
Source	Rating
Allmusic	3/5 stars

Blue Chip is the third album by Acoustic Alchemy, released under the MCA Master Series label in 1989, and again under GRP in 1996. The album presented an experiment with pop music in the band's signature style using strong memorable melody lines.

The most successful track is "Catalina Kiss", the album opener and a longstanding live favourite. Using a shuffle rhythm, the track calls upon the saxophone for embellishments, whilst tonal harmonies between the two guitars evoke a strong melody. JazzTrax host Art Good suggested that the song was inspired by a performance the band performed at the Catalina Island Jazz Festival in 1988.

== Track listing ==
#	Title	Writers	Duration
1	"Catalina Kiss"	Webb/Carmichael/Parsons	4:33
2	"The Blue Chip Bop"	Webb/Carmichael/Parsons	3:41
3	"Making Waves"	Webb/Carmichael/Parsons	4:51
4	"With You In Mind"	Webb/Carmichael/Parsons	3:58
5	"Bright Tiger"	Webb/Carmichael	4:47
6	"Ariane"	Webb/Carmichael/Parsons	4:53
7	"Highland"	Webb/Carmichael/Parsons	4:42
8	"Boulder Coaster"	Webb/Carmichael/Parsons	5:26
9	"Hearts In Chains"	Webb/Carmichael	3:29
10	"No More Nachos (Por Favor)"	Webb/Carmichael	3:34

== Personnel ==
Acoustic Alchemy

- Greg Carmichael – acoustic guitars
- Nick Webb – acoustic guitars

Additional musicians

- Rainer Bruninghaus – acoustic piano, keyboards
- John Parsons – electric guitars, guitar synthesizer
- Klaus Sperber – basses
- Bert Smaak – drums, drum programming, percussion
- Mario Argadoña – percussion
- Klaus Genuit – percussion programming, sound design
- Karl Heinz Wiberny – saxophones, woodwinds

== Production ==
- John Parsons – producer
- Klaus Genuit – engineer, mixing
- Milan Bogdan – digital editing
- Benny Quinn – digital editing, mastering
- Masterfonics (Nashville, Tennessee, USA) – editing and mastering location
- Acoustic Alchemy – art direction
- Virginia Team – design
- Kevin Calvert – photography
- Stewart Coxhead for Bullet Management, Ltd. – management
