= Red Dust & Spanish Lace =

Studio album by Acoustic Alchemy
- Released: May 4, 1987
- Recorded: 1987
- Studio: Hansa-Haus Studios (Bonn, Germany): Hot Nights Studios (London, UK)
- Genre: Smooth jazz
- Length: 38:15
- Label: MCA 5816; GRP 9833 (1996 re-release)
- Producer: John Parsons

Acoustic Alchemy chronology
Red Dust & Spanish Lace (1987)	Natural Elements (1988)

Red Dust & Spanish Lace
- Original cover

Professional ratings
Review scores
Source	Rating
AllMusic	4.5/5 stars

Red Dust and Spanish Lace was the breakthrough debut album by Acoustic Alchemy from 1987. Comprising nine tracks in total, the album spawned the radio-friendly single "Mr. Chow", which was described as "Chinese reggae". Other highlights include "Sarah Victoria", a re-recording of an early demo track, and the title track.

== Track listing ==
No.	Title	Writer(s)	Length
1.	"Mr. Chow"	Nick Webb; Greg Carmichael	3:06
2.	"Ricochet"	Nick Webb; Greg Carmichael; John Parsons	3:20
3.	"The Stone Circle"	Nick Webb; Greg Carmichael; John Parsons	4:16
4.	"The Rideout"	Nick Webb; Greg Carmichael	3:33
5.	"Girl With A Red Carnation"	Nick Webb	3:07
6.	"The Colonel And The Ashes"	Nick Webb; Greg Carmichael	3:24
7.	"One For The Road"	Nick Webb; John Parsons; Jeff Clyne	6:23
8.	"Sarah Victoria"	Nick Webb	2:19
9.	"Red Dust And Spanish Lace"	Nick Webb; Greg Carmichael; John Parsons	8:47
Total length:			38:15

== Singles ==
1. "Mr. Chow"

== Personnel ==
Acoustic Alchemy

- Greg Carmichael – nylon guitar (1–4, 6–9), steel string guitar (2, 5)
- Nick Webb – steel string guitar, nylon guitar (5)

Additional musicians

- Rainer Bruninghaus – keyboards (1–5, 7, 9)
- David Munday – keyboards (6)
- John Parsons – harmony steel string guitar (1)
- Werner Kopal – bass (1, 2, 7, 9)
- Gunnar Plümer – acoustic bass (3, 4)
- Bert Smaak – drums (1, 2, 4, 7)
- Mario Argandoña – percussion (1, 3, 5, 7, 9)
- Simon Morton – percussion (6)

=== Production ===
- John Parsons – producer
- Klaus Genuit – recording (1–5, 7–9)
- John Brand – recording (6)
- Manfred Struck – mixing at Fairland Studios (Bochum, Germany)
- Milan Bogdan – digital editing
- Benny Quinn – mastering at Masterfonics (Nashville, Tennessee, USA)
- Simon Levy – art direction
- Virginia Team – art direction, design
- Jerry Joyner – front cover artwork
- Gary Ledden – back cover photography
