= Acoustic Alchemy =

English jazz band

- Origin: London, England, U.K.
- Genres: Instrumental smooth jazz, contemporary jazz, mainstream jazz, jazz-pop, folk-jazz, world fusion, new Age
- Years active: 1981–present
- Labels: MCA, GRP, Higher Octave, Narada, Heads Up
- Members: Greg Carmichael; Miles Gilderdale; Greg Grainger; Julian Crampton; Gary Grainger; Anthony "Fred" White; Eddie M
- Past members: Dennis Murphy; Terry Disley; Nick Webb; John Parsons; Simon James; Bert Smaak; Mario Argandoña; Frank Felix; John Sheppard; Richard Brook
- Website: acousticalchemy.co.uk

Acoustic Alchemy is an English smooth jazz band formed in England in the early 1980s by Nick Webb and Simon James.

== 1981–1989: Early days ==
Acoustic Alchemy was formed around the acoustic guitars of Simon James (nylon string) and Nick Webb (steel string), often backed up by double bass, percussion, and string quartet the Violettes. The band made two albums that were unprofitable. In the mid-1980s, James left, and in the 1990s he formed Kymaera, a similar, though more Latin oriented band.

In 1985, Webb discovered Greg Carmichael, a guitarist with a London pub band called the Holloways (not affiliated with the indie band of the same name), who became James' successor. The new pairing found work as an in-flight band on Virgin Atlantic flights to and from the United States. Six weeks after sending demos to MCA, the band was called to record their first album, which was released in 1987 titled Red Dust and Spanish Lace. Appearing on the album were Mario Argandoña on percussion and Bert Smaak on drums. The album was the first of many to be recorded at the Hansa Haus Studios, in Bonn, Germany, where they met sound engineer Klaus Genuit, who worked on many of the band's albums. Two more albums followed for MCA: Natural Elements (1988) and Blue Chip (1989). The title track from Natural Elements became the theme music for the BBC TV programme Gardeners' World.

== 1990–1998: Mainstream success ==
Acoustic Alchemy were soon moved to jazz label GRP as MCA bought GRP in February 1990. Six more albums followed, starting with Reference Point (1990), featuring a cover of "Take Five" by Dave Brubeck and Back on the Case (1991). Reference Point was nominated for a Grammy Award. Webb uncovered fourteen early tracks from 1982 to 1987 featuring Simon James, which were released on the compilation Early Alchemy (1992). The New Edge (1993) and Against the Grain (1994) followed.

For their eighth album, Arcanum (1996), the band re-recorded some of its popular tracks. The album was recorded in London's Pinewood Studios with the string section of the London Metropolitan Orchestra. The collection included three new tracks, "Columbia", "Something She Said", and "Chance Meeting". Personnel on the recording was Webb, Carmichael, Sheppard, Murphy and Parsons. It was produced by Aubry "Po" Powell, who worked with Pink Floyd, Paul McCartney, Jimmy Page, and Robert Plant.

Positive Thinking (1998) was to be Acoustic Alchemy's last album with original frontman Nick Webb. It was recorded over a week in a large house in Monkton Combe, near Bath, England. Recorded by Steve Jones, the musicians were Greg Carmichael (guitar), John Sheppard (drums), and Dennis Murphy (bass).

Webb was diagnosed with pancreatic cancer before working on the album and died on 5 February 1998.

== 1999: Reform and changes ==
After Webb's death, Greg Carmichael brought in Miles Gilderdale as his partner, and the band moved label to Higher Octave Music. The debut album on the label, The Beautiful Game, (2000) was more experimental, borrowing from several genres of music. It featured the introduction of Anthony "Fred" White on keyboards.

AArt (2001) was released a year later and was nominated for a Grammy Award for Best Contemporary Instrumental Album.

Radio Contact (2003) contained "Little Laughter", the band's first song with a vocal, performed by Jo Harrop. Harrop was a backing vocalist who was discovered by Gilderdale during a session with Latin singer Enrique Iglesias.

Early in 2006, bassist Frank Felix left the band to concentrate on other projects. The position was filled by two bass players: former Incognito and Down to the Bone bassist Julian Crampton for UK dates and guitarist Gary Grainger (brother of longtime drummer Greg Grainger) in the U.S.

GRP re-released a concert/documentary video of Acoustic Alchemy entitled Best Kept Secret on 25 July 2006.

This Way (2007) included guest appearances by trumpeter Rick Braun and Down to the Bone. Roseland followed in 2011.

== Discography ==
=== Singles ===
- "The Earl of Salisbury's Pavane", GRP Christmas album Vol. 2 (1991)

=== DVDs ===
- Sounds of St. Lucia: Live (2003)
- Best Kept Secret (2006, re-release of VHS from 1998)

=== Albums ===
Year	Title	Members							
Year	Title	Steel string guitar	Nylon string guitar	Electric guitar	Bass	Keyboards	Drums	Percussion	Other instrument
1987	Red Dust and Spanish Lace	Nick Webb, John Parsons	Greg Carmichael	–	Werner Kopal	Rainer Brüninghaus	Bert Smaak	Mario Argandoña	–
1988	Natural Elements	Nick Webb, John Parsons	Greg Carmichael	–	Konrad Mathieu	Rainer Brüninghaus	Bert Smaak	Mario Argandoña	–
1989	Blue Chip	Nick Webb	Greg Carmichael	John Parsons	Klaus Sperber	Rainer Brüninghaus	Bert Smaak	Mario Argandoña	Karl-Heinz Wiberny (saxophone)
1990	Reference Point	Nick Webb	Greg Carmichael	–	Patrick Bettison, Abe White	Terry Disley	Dan Tomlinson	Mario Argandoña	Randy Brecker (trumpet, flugelhorn), Terry Dee (harmonica)
1991	Back on the Case	Nick Webb	Greg Carmichael	–	Klaus Sperber	Terry Disley	Bert Smaak	Mario Argandoña	Ludwig Gotz (trombone)
1992	Early Alchemy	Nick Webb	Simon James	–	Jeff Clyne, Ron Mathewson	–	–	Mario Argandoña	The Violettes (string quartet)
1993	The New Edge	Nick Webb	Greg Carmichael	–	Dave Pomeroy, Patrick Bettison	Rainer Brüninghaus, Terry Disley	Dan Tomlinson	Mario Argandoña	Derrick James (saxophone)
1994	Against the Grain	Nick Webb	Greg Carmichael	John Parsons	Paul Harriman	Mike Herting, Terry Disley	Bert Smaak	Mario Argandoña	–
1994	Greatest Hits	Various							
1996	Arcanum	Nick Webb	Greg Carmichael	John Parsons	Dennis Murphy	–	John Sheppard	Mario Argandoña	Tony Rice
1998	Positive Thinking...	John Parsons	Greg Carmichael	Miles Gilderdale	Dennis Murphy	Rainer Brüninghaus	John Sheppard	Mario Argandoña	–
2000	The Beautiful Game	Miles Gilderdale	Greg Carmichael	Miles Gilderdale, John Parsons	Frank Felix	Anthony "Fred" White	Geoff Dunn	Scooter de Long	Terry Disley (piano)
2001	AArt	Miles Gilderdale	Greg Carmichael	Miles Gilderdale	Frank Felix	Anthony "Fred" White	Pete Lewinson	Richard Bull	Terry Disley (piano), Fayyaz Virji (trombone), Snake Davis and Jeff Kashiwa (saxophone)
2002	The Very Best of Acoustic Alchemy	Various							
2003	Sounds of St. Lucia: Live	Miles Gilderdale	Greg Carmichael	–	Frank Felix	Anthony "Fred" White	Richard Brook	–	–
2003	Radio Contact	Miles Gilderdale	Greg Carmichael	Miles Gilderdale	Frank Felix	Anthony "Fred" White, Jamie Norton	Greg Grainger	Mario Argandoña	Neil Cowley (piano), Jo Harrop (vocal), Eddie M (saxophone)
2005	American/English	Miles Gilderdale	Greg Carmichael	Miles Gilderdale	Frank Felix	Anthony "Fred" White, Jamie Norton	Greg Grainger, Bert Smaak	–	Eddie M (Saxophone)
2007	This Way	Miles Gilderdale	Greg Carmichael	Miles Gilderdale	Julian Crampton	Anthony "Fred" White	Greg Grainger, Bert Smaak	–	Neil Cowley (piano), Terry Disley (piano), Rick Braun (flugelhorn), Jeff Kashiwa (saxophone)
2008	The Very Best of Acoustic Alchemy Vol. 2	Various							
2011	Roseland	Miles Gilderdale	Greg Carmichael	Miles Gilderdale	Julian Crampton	Anthony "Fred" White	Greg Grainger		
2014	Live in London	Miles Gilderdale	Greg Carmichael	Miles Gilderdale	Gary Grainger	Anthony "Fred" White	Greg Grainger		
2018	33 1/3	Miles Gilderdale	Greg Carmichael	Miles Gilderdale	Gary Grainger	Anthony "Fred" White	Greg Grainger		
2025	The Empire of Lights, Part One [EP]	Miles Gilderdale	Greg Carmichael	Miles Gilderdale	Gary Grainger	Jay Rowe	Greg Grainger		
