= AArt =

Studio album by Acoustic Alchemy
- Released: 25 September 2001
- Recorded: 2001
- Studios: Higher Ground Studios, London, UK
- Genre: Smooth jazz
- Length: 62:14
- Labels: Higher Octave Music; 11103
- Producer: Richard Bull

Acoustic Alchemy chronology
The Beautiful Game (2000)	AArt (2001)	Sounds of St. Lucia: Live (2003)

Professional ratings
Review scores
Source	Rating
AllMusic	3/5 stars

AArt is the eleventh album to be released by smooth jazz band Acoustic Alchemy. It contains more tracks than any other studio recording by the band, with fourteen.

Continuing on from the radical enforced changes on The Beautiful Game, AArt follows precedent with another varied mix of styles and genres, and even calls upon saxophonist Jeff Kashiwa, formerly of The Rippingtons, to share the lead on one track, "AArt Attack".

"The Velvet Swing" achieved daytime radio play on London's 102.2 Jazz FM.

== Track listing ==
#	Title	Writers	Duration
1	"Wish You Were Near"	Greg Carmichael; Miles Gilderdale; Anthony H. White	4:05
2	"AArt Attack"	Greg Carmichael; Miles Gilderdale	4:01
3	"Flamoco Loco"	Greg Carmichael; Miles Gilderdale	4:05
4	"Tuff Puzzle"	Greg Carmichael; Miles Gilderdale; Frank Felix	5:14
5	"Passion Play"	Greg Carmichael; Miles Gilderdale	4:46
6	"Senjo Wine"	Greg Carmichael; Miles Gilderdale; Frank Felix	4:33
7	"Viva Ché"	Greg Carmichael; Miles Gilderdale; Frank Felix	3:44
8	"The Velvet Swing"	Greg Carmichael; Miles Gilderdale; Anthony H. White	5:36
9	"Robbie's Revenge"	Greg Carmichael; Miles Gilderdale; Anthony H. White	4:10
10	"Love At A Distance"	Greg Carmichael; Miles Gilderdale; Terence Disley	4:14
11	"Code Name Pandora"	Greg Carmichael; Miles Gilderdale	5:10
12	"Nathan Road"	Greg Carmichael; Miles Gilderdale; Anthony H. White	5:07
13	"Cactus Blue"	Greg Carmichael; Miles Gilderdale	4:56
14	"The Wind Of Change"	Greg Carmichael; Miles Gilderdale; Anthony H. White	2:33

== Singles ==
1. "Wish You Were Near"
