= Simon James (musician) =

English musician (born 1954)

Simon James (born 13 March 1954) is an English acoustic guitarist and a founding member of Acoustic Alchemy. After leaving the band, he formed Kymaera, a Latin-style contemporary jazz band.

== Early years and education ==
Born in York, England, James was educated at Ampleforth College, North Yorkshire Leeds College of Music, studying flute and guitar, and Trinity College of Music, London, where he studied guitar and composition with Hector Quine and David Newbold respectively. He joined the teaching staff at Trinity in 1977 and became guitar tutor at the Purcell School of Music in 1984. In 1981 he attended a master class in flamenco given by Paco Peña in Cordoba, Spain. Flamenco influenced his music on the early recordings by Acoustic Alchemy. In 1983 he became guitar teacher at Whitgift School.

== Career ==
In 1979 James helped start the band Acoustic Alchemy. In 1985, he left the band to pursue other interests. He has toured solo, with Nick Webb, and with Maria Ewing, and has performed on live broadcasts for radio and television.

In 1984–1985 James and Webb began a collaboration with actress Sylvia Syms on a series of shows combining poetry and music ("The Female Principle", "If This Be Love", "Mothers and Daughters", "Love Lust and We All Make Mistakes"). This involved writing and arranging music for the shows and appearing in them.

In 1987 James started the publishing company Designer Music. Commissions have included a fifteen part history of bullfighting released in Spain by Planeta/Agostini in Autumn 1994 and a thirteen part series on serial killers produced by Mainline Television in 1996 for SKY TV. Another series of commissions lead to the formation of the band Kymaera in 1998.

Kymaera's first album, Rio Moods (MCI), was a tribute to the music of Antonio Carlos Jobim but also contained original compositions. The second album consisted of music by George Michael. James and guitarist Shane Hill arranged the music and produced the albums. Kymaera made its debut at Ronnie Scott's Jazz Club on 21 June 1998. A third album, Careless Whispers, was released in September 1998. Into the Rainbow (2001) was a tribute to his former partner Webb, who died in February 1998, and included Ewing and Greg Carmichael from Acoustic Alchemy. In July and August 2001 Kymaera made an album for Union Square entitled California Dreamin' which was released the following year. In 2004 Kymaera recorded another album for Union Square. Some tracks were released in 2006 on Smooth Jazz with vocals by Lynieve Austin. In 2006, James formed the band Almaraya based on the rhythm section of Kymaera and the vocals of Austin. The band performed for the first time at Croydon Jazz Festival in April of that year.
