= Frank Felix =

British musician

Frank Felix is a bass guitar player, from London, England.

He is credited with working with the following: Snake Davis, Peter White, Light of the World, Gabrielle, Lonnie Liston Smith, Acoustic Alchemy, Dave Koz, Nelly Furtado, Jim Diamond, Ronnie Laws, Heatwave (band), Mica Paris, Fatboy Slim, Jeff Kashiwa and Tony Hadley.

After seven years with the successful contemporary jazz group Acoustic Alchemy, Felix left the band to pursue a solo career. His first album, Funky Underground: Vol 1 was released in 2007.
