= Miles Gilderdale =

Miles Gilderdale (born in Kingston, Jamaica) is a member of smooth jazz group Acoustic Alchemy and plays the steel-string acoustic guitar and electric guitar.

In 1996, Gilderdale became a member of the contemporary jazz group Acoustic Alchemy and has collaborated on seven releases, including 2001's Grammy nominated AArt. Gilderdale contributed to the group's 1998 release Positive Thinking... and was selected by Greg Carmichael for the steel string acoustic chair which was left vacant by the passing of the group's original founder, Nick Webb.

A seasoned guitarist and performer, Miles Gilderdale first became known in the UK and Europe to audiences in the 1980s as the lead singer and guitarist in York/Harrogate-based soul band Zoot and the Roots which also included the sax player Snake Davis. He has worked on stage with artists as diverse as Ben E. King, Ronnie Wood, and Jools Holland, as well as having done numerous live BBC Radio 1 broadcasts and TV appearances.

Gilderdale has composed material for the award-winning computer game Broken Sword by Revolution software and regularly has incidental music feature on TV and Radio which he writes with the independent production company MZen

When not touring with Acoustic Alchemy, he can be often spotted gigging around the UK with The Blueflies, a funk/blues outfit composed of Miles, ex-Zoots bassist and co-songwriter Gavin Ewing and drummer Paul Stipetic. While allowing Gilderdale to rock-out and improvise, The Blueflies hard-edged funk blues sound is in contrast to his 'smooth jazz' solo work and performances with Acoustic Alchemy.
