= Trio Rio =

German quintet

- Origin: Cologne, Germany
- Genres: Latin dance, Eurodisco
- Years active: 1983–1987
- Label: Metronome Records
- Members: Peter Fessler; Serge Maillard; Oliver Heuss; Cläusel Quitschau; Pablo Escayola; Klaus Mages

Trio Rio was a German quintet from Cologne.

== History ==
The band was founded in 1983 by vocalist Peter Fessler (born 1959) together with four friends all of whom he met during his study at the Cologne University of Music. They are best known for their hit song "New York - Rio - Tokyo" which reached number three on the German chart in 1986. The follow-up single, "Voulez Voulez Vous" did not manage to chart. The band separated in 1987.

Following the band's separation. Fessler moved to the United States for a while. Performing solo in clubs, bars and hotels in New York and San Francisco, before returning to Germany in 1991 to restart his solo career. in 1993 he would release "Conquer Me", which became solo hit. From there he switched to playing jazz with Randy Crawford, Sheila E., Al Jarreau and Chaka Khan, he also began writing songs for various artists. Klaus Mages later joined the Rainbirds. Oliver Heuss went on to compose film scores and ad jingles. The bass player of the band, Cläusel Quitschau, died in 2016.

== Members ==
- Peter Fessler (vocals) (1983–1987)
- Serge Maillard (vocals) (1987)
- Oliver Heuss (keyboard) (1983-1987)
- Cläusel Quitschau (bass) (1983-1987) † September 27, 2016
- Pablo Escayola (percussion) (1983-1987)
- Klaus Mages (drums) (1983–1987)

== Discography ==
=== Albums ===
- 1986 - Trio Rio (#23 Germany)
- 1987 - Voodoo Nights
- 1990 - Who Dat, Mon?

=== Singles ===
- 1986 - "I'm Still In Love With You"
- 1986 - "New York - Rio - Tokyo" (#3 Germany – 14 weeks on the chart)
- 1987 - "Voulez Voulez Vous"
- 1987 - "Greatest Love"
- 1990 - "Who Dat, Mon?"
