= Terry Disley =

British musician

Terry Disley is a jazz keyboardist and composer who was born in London. While in London, Cannes and Los Angeles in the 1990s, he recorded with many artists including Bryan Ferry, Bon Jovi, Sir Van Morrison, Sir Paul McCartney, George Harrison, Madness, Sir Mick Jagger, Terry Hall and Billy Bragg. For five years, he was also the musical director for Dave Stewart, contributing music for a whole range of albums and five major motion picture scores including Showgirls, Beautiful Girls and The Ref.

He was a touring and recording keyboardist with UK jazz group Acoustic Alchemy from their earliest days in the late 1980s through to the mid-1990s. Disley was an influence on their recordings and co-wrote on Acoustic Alchemy's Grammy-nominated CD Back on the Case. After the death of Nick Webb in 1998, Acoustic Alchemy returned in 2000 with a release on EMI's Higher Octave label. Disley composed the radio hit "The Beautiful Game" for that release as well as "Tete a Tete" and followed these with "Love at a Distance" on the follow-up CD, Aart, also nominated for a Grammy award. In 2004, 2005 and 2006, Disley appeared on Acoustic Alchemy's US and UK tours as a special guest.

After relocating to San Francisco, he formed his own group, the Terry Disley Experience, which has received rave reviews from appearances at the Lake Tahoe and Catalina Jazz Festivals, the SF JAZZ Stanford Summerfest Series, the Filoli Jazz concert series and two appearances at the Sonoma Jazz Festival.

The group's CD's, including Experience, London Underground, Across the Pond, The Jazzcracker & Other Delights, West Coast Jazz Impressions and Brubeck vs. Guaraldi, have received extensive national and international radio airplay, and Disley's group continues to gather momentum at live dates around the San Francisco Bay Area including sell-out shows at Yoshi's Jazz Club, the Bach Dancing and Dynamite Society and the Little Fox Theater.
