= Nick Webb (musician) =

English acoustic guitarist and composer (1954–1998)

- Born: 14 March 1954; Manchester, Lancashire, England
- Died: 5 February 1998 (aged 43) London, England
- Genre: Smooth jazz
- Occupation: Musician
- Instrument: Guitar
- Formerly of: Acoustic Alchemy

Nicholas Webb (14 March 1954 – 5 February 1998) was an English acoustic guitarist, composer, and co-founder of contemporary jazz group Acoustic Alchemy. Webb was the brother of Alex Webb, the nephew of actress Sylvia Syms, and appeared as a child in The Punch and Judy Man (1963), British comedian Tony Hancock's second starring film, in which Syms played the wife of his character.

== Career ==
Nick Webb was born in Manchester, Lancashire, and educated at Berkhamsted School, Ashlyns School (in Berkhamsted), the London Academy of Music and Dramatic Art (LAMDA), and Leeds College of Music. Captivated by the folk musicians of the 1960s, particularly John Martyn, he began playing and performing as a teenager and ran The Portcullis Club in Berkhamsted.

At the beginning of the 1980s, Webb met classical and flamenco guitarist Simon James and founded Acoustic Alchemy as a duo, recording a self-financed, self-produced album in 1981. James left the partnership to study flamenco guitar in Spain, leaving Webb to promote the record. He turned to rock guitarist Greg Carmichael, whose background complemented his own. Webb had studied jazz at Leeds while Carmichael had studied classical music at London College of Music.

The duo worked for Virgin Airlines, recording in-flight music for trans-Atlantic flights, then signed to MCA, which released their 1987 debut album Red Dust & Spanish Lace. The album included assistance from percussionist Mario Aragandoña and drummer Bart Smaak and was the first of many to be produced by German audio engineer Klaus Genuit at Hansa Haus Studios in Bonn, Germany. After the albums Natural Elements in 1988 and Blue Chip in 1989, Acoustic Alchemy signed with GRP Records, which released Reference Point in 1990. The album was nominated for a Grammy Award. GRP released Back on the Case (1991), The New Edge (1993), Against the Grain (1994) and Arcanum (1996). During the 1990s the band toured the United States.

Positive Thinking (1998) was Acoustic Alchemy's last album with Webb. Due to pancreatic cancer, he was unable to perform on the album, but he wrote for it and supervised the recording. He died in February 1998, and the album was released later that year.
