= Greg Carmichael =

British guitarist

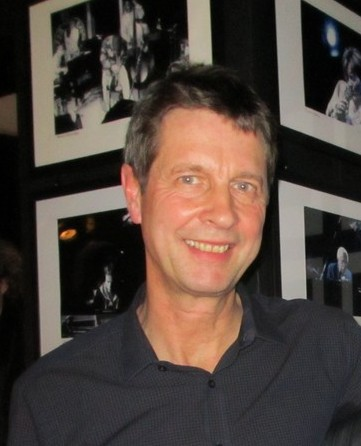
- Carmichael at Pizza Express Jazz club in London, 2012

Background information
- Born: 7 August 1953 (age 71)
- Occupation: Musician
- Instrument: Guitar
- Member of: Acoustic Alchemy

Greg Carmichael (born 7 August 1953) is a British guitarist and co-founding member (along with Nick Webb) of contemporary jazz group Acoustic Alchemy. His primary instrument is the nylon-string acoustic guitar. He joined the band in 1985 as a partner with steel-string guitarist Nick Webb to work on the band's first album, Red Dust and Spanish Lace, and has been at the forefront of the band ever since.

After the death of Webb from pancreatic cancer in 1998, Carmichael decided to continue with the band, calling on steel-string guitarist Miles Gilderdale as a partner.
