= Manhattan (disambiguation) =

Manhattan is the most densely populated borough of New York City.

Manhattan may also refer to:

== Places ==
- Manhattan, Colorado, a ghost town
- Manhattan, Florida, an unincorporated community
- Manhattan, Illinois, a village in Will County
- Manhattan, Indiana, an unincorporated community
- Manhattan, Kansas, a city
- Manhattan, Montana, a town
- Manhattan, Nevada, a town
- Manhattan estate, Wrocław, a residential and commercial complex

== Businesses ==
- The Manhattan Company, a bank in the United States operating independently from 1799 to 1955
- Manhattan Construction Company, a division of Rooney Holdings Inc.
- Manhattan Life Insurance Company, founded in 1850
- Hotel Manhattan, a former hotel in New York City

== Ships ==
- Manhattan (1843 ship), a ship that made the first authorized United States visit to Tokyo Bay
- Manhattan (YTB-779), a large harbor tug serving from 1965 to 2004
- SS Manhattan (1931), a luxury liner
- SS Manhattan (1962), a tanker constructed to pass the Northwest Passage
- USS Manhattan (1863), a Union Navy ship in service until 1902

== Music ==
- Manhattan Records, a record label
- The Manhattans, an R&B group from the 1970s and 80s
- Manhattan (Art Farmer album), 1981, or the title song
- Manhattan (Jeffrey Lewis & Los Bolts album), 2015
- Manhattan (Skaters album), 2014
- "Manhattan" (song), a song written in 1925 by Rodgers and Hart
- "Manhattan", a 1973 song by C. Jérôme
- "Manhattan", a 2023 song by Chvrches from The Bones of What You Believe (10 Year Anniversary Edition)
- "Manhattan", a 2009 song by Kings of Leon from Only by the Night
- "Manhattan", a 2006 song by La Oreja de Van Gogh from Guapa
- "Manhattan", a 2012 song by Cat Power from Sun
- Manhattan (soundtrack), to the 1979 film
- The Manhattan Transfer, jazz and pop vocal quartet

== Film and television ==
- Manhattan (1924 film), a film starring Richard Dix
- Manhattan (1979 film), a film by Woody Allen
- Manhattan (TV series), a 2014–2016 series
- "Manhattan" (Once Upon a Time), a 2013 episode of Once Upon a Time
- Manhattan, a fictional town in Manhattan, AZ

== Schools ==
- Manhattan Christian College, Manhattan, Kansas
- Manhattan High School, Manhattan, Kansas
- Manhattan School, Manhattan, Nevada
- Manhattan School of Music, Manhattan, New York
- Manhattan University, Bronx, New York

== Buildings ==
- Manhattan Laundry, a complex of historic buildings in Washington, D.C.
- Manhattan Tower, an apartment building in the Park Tzameret neighborhood of Tel Aviv, Israel

== Other uses ==
- Manhattan (board game), a 1990s board game by Andreas Seyfarth
- Manhattan (cocktail), an alcoholic drink
- Manhattan, a 1979 novel by Neal Travis
- Manhattan Avenue (Brooklyn), in Williamsburg and Greenpoint, New York
- Manhattan Avenue (Manhattan), in Harlem and the Upper West Side, New York
- Manhattan Bridge, connecting Lower Manhattan and Brooklyn
- Manhattan Handicap, an American Thoroughbred horse race held annually at Belmont Park in Elmont, New York
- Manhattan Limited, a Pennsylvania Railroad that ran between Chicago and New York City until 1971
- Manhattan station, a commuter railroad station on Metra's SouthWest Service in Manhattan, Illinois
- Manhattan Theatre, a former Broadway theatre
- Manhattan Project, an operation that built the first nuclear weapons
- Manhattan Rebellion, a failed coup attempt against the government of Thailand in 1951

== People with the surname ==
- Avro Manhattan (1914–1990), a writer best known for his criticisms of the Roman Catholic Church

== See also ==
- Doctor Manhattan, a character in the comic Watchmen
- Manhattan Building (disambiguation)
- Manhattan distance or Manhattan length, a distance relating to taxicab geometry
- Manhattan wiring, a technique for laying out circuits in computer engineering
- USS Manhattan, a list of ships
- Manhattan, Inc., a monthly magazine (1984–1990)
- Mainhattan, the business center of Frankfurt am Main
