= HandPicked =

Studio album by Earl Klugh
- Released: July 30, 2013
- Studio: Studio 861 (Atlanta, Georgia); Flora Recording and Playback (Portland, Oregon); Record Plant (Hollywood, California); The House (Nashville, Tennessee)
- Genre: Smooth jazz
- Length: 55:36
- Label: Heads Up
- Producer: Earl Klugh; Bill Frisell; Jake Shimabukuro; Vince Gill

Earl Klugh chronology
| The Spice of Life (2008) | HandPicked (2013) |

HandPicked is a studio album by jazz guitarist Earl Klugh released on July 30, 2013. This is Klugh's first album of new material since he released The Spice of Life in 2008 and it is also his first for the Heads Up label. The album features Klugh playing solo guitar arrangements on 13 of the 16 songs in a style similar to his earlier albums Solo Guitar and Naked Guitar. On the remaining three tracks, Klugh plays duets with guitarist Bill Frisell, ukulele player Jake Shimabukuro, and guitarist and vocalist Vince Gill.

== Reception ==
Professional ratings
Review scores
| Source | Rating |
|---|---|
| AllMusic | 4/5 stars |
| Premier Guitar | 4/5 |
| PopMatters | 7/10 stars |

Writing for AllMusic, critic Thom Jurek wrote, "It's been five years since Earl Klugh issued the smooth chamber group offering The Spice of Life." "It's been a long time since we heard Klugh this way, almost totally solo, taking an intimate look at music he loves from across the spectrum. His graceful yet inventive playing, the clean production, and a canny choice of material make Hand Picked one of the finest recordings in his catalog."

Jason Shadrick of Premier Guitar gives the album a 4 out of a possible 5 picks and writes, "On HandPicked, Klugh sticks with mainly pop and jazz standards and doesn't fall into the trap of over-arranging tunes to the detriment of melodies. He opens with Burt Bacharach's "Alfie," holding true to the original’s melody, but adding his trademark harmonic twists and turns, as well as occasional technical flash."

Brent Faulkner of PopMatters gives the album 7 out of a possible 10 and concludes his review with, "Ultimately, Handpicked is pleasant showing the total musician flexing his muscles. The bar has long been established for Klugh, but this effort is definitely confirmation of his elite status."

Matthew Alley reviews the album for Black Grooves and concludes, "While it may be a bit inconsistent at times, overall Handpicked is a strong effort from the virtuoso guitarist and is well-deserving of its Grammy nomination for Best Pop Instrumental Album of 2013. Klugh continues to surprise and delight with his clever arrangements, compositions, and performances."

== Track listing ==
1. "Alfie" (Burt Bacharach, Hal David) – 2:34
2. "Lullaby of Birdland" (George Shearing) – 2:28
3. "Blue Moon" (Duet with Bill Frisell) (Lorenz Hart, Richard Rodgers) – 6:11
4. "In Six" (Earl Klugh) – 4:08
5. "Cast Your Fate To The Wind" (Vince Guaraldi) – 3:14
6. "Hotel California" (Duet with Jake Shimabukuro) (Don Felder, Glenn Frey, Don Henley) – 8:05
7. "More and More Amor" (Sol Lake) – 3:38
8. "'Round Midnight" (Thelonious Monk, Cootie Williams, Bernard Hanighen) – 2:31
9. "But Beautiful" (Johnny Burke, Jimmy Van Heusen) – 1:48
10. "All I Have to Do Is Dream" (Duet with Vince Gill) (Boudleaux Bryant) – 3:46
11. "Goin' Out of My Head" (Teddy Randazzo, Bobby Weinstein) – 3:39
12. "If I Fell" (John Lennon, Paul McCartney) – 1:58
13. "Where the Wind Takes Me" (Klugh) – 2:03
14. "Morning Rain" (Klugh) – 3:16
15. "Love Is a Many Splendored Thing" (Sammy Fain, Paul Francis Webster) – 2:21
16. "This Time (Solo)" (Klugh) – 3:56

== Personnel ==
- Earl Klugh – guitar
- Bill Frisell – guitar on "Blue Moon"
- Jake Shimabukuro – ukulele on "Hotel California"
- Vince Gill – guitar and vocals on "All I Have To Do Is Dream"

== Production ==
- Earl Klugh – executive producer, producer
- Bill Frisell – producer (3)
- Jake Shimabukuro – producer (6)
- Vince Gill – producer (10)
- Audrey Birnbaum – project coordinator, management
- Denise Waichunas – project coordinator, management
- Ashley Bothwell – package design
- Annette Tanner – photography
- Vii Tanner – photography

Technical credits

- Alan Silverman – mastering at ARF Mastering, Inc. (New York, NY)
- Bert Elliott – mixing, recording (1, 2, 4, 5, 7–9, 11–16)
- Tucker Martine – recording (3)
- Erik Zobler – recording (6)
- Matt Rausch – recording (10)
- Michael Finn – assistant engineer (3)
- Daniel Zaidenstadt – assistant engineer (6)
