= Midnight in San Juan (Earl Klugh album) =

Studio album by Earl Klugh
- Released: February 19, 1991
- Recorded: March 1989–April 1990
- Studio: Lakeview Studio and Mark Nilan's Studio (Detroit, Michigan); Studio A (Dearborn Heights, Michigan); Conway Studios (Hollywood, California); Clinton Studios (New York City, New York)
- Genre: Smooth jazz, crossover jazz, instrumental pop
- Length: 41:25
- Label: Warner Bros.
- Producer: Earl Klugh

Earl Klugh chronology
Solo Guitar (1989)	Midnight in San Juan (1991)	Move (1994)

Professional ratings
Review scores
Source	Rating
allmusic.com	2.5/5 stars

Midnight in San Juan is a smooth jazz studio album by Earl Klugh released on February 19, 1991. It was his 16th studio album. The album was a commercial success as it reached No.1 on many jazz radio and retail charts, including hitting No.1 on the Top Contemporary Jazz Albums charts. In this release, Klugh lays heavy emphasis on Latin and Caribbean elements. Two songs on the album feature legendary NEA Jazz Master Jean "Toots" Thielemans on the harmonica and Grammy Award winner Don Sebesky as conductor and arranger.

== Track listing ==
All songs written by Earl Klugh.

1. "Midnight in San Juan" – 5:53
2. "Every Moment with You" – 3:57
3. "Kissin' on the Beach" – 6:07
4. "She Never Said Why" – 4:32
5. "Movimientos del Alma (Rhythms of the Soul)" – 4:40
6. "Jamaican Winds" – 3:44
7. "Theme for a Rainy Day" – 5:26
8. "Take You There" – 7:06

== Personnel ==
=== Musicians ===
- Earl Klugh – keyboards (1–4, 6), guitars
- Barnaby Finch – keyboards (1, 3, 4)
- Ronnie Foster – keyboards (1, 3, 4)
- Mark Nilan – keyboards (1)
- Ruben Rodriquez – acoustic piano (5)
- Richard Tee – acoustic piano (6), electric piano (6)
- Eliane Elias – acoustic piano (8)
- Chuck Loeb – guitars (8)
- Abraham Laboriel – bass (1, 3, 4)
- Oscar Hernández – bass (5)
- Luico Hopper – bass (6)
- Ron Carter – bass (8)
- Harvey Mason – drums (1–4, 8)
- Gene Dunlap – drum programming (2)
- Robby Ameen – drums (5)
- Buddy Williams – drums (6)
- Paulinho da Costa – percussion (1, 3, 4, 8)
- Sammy Figueroa – percussion (5, 6)
- Ralph Irizarry – percussion (5)
- Toots Thielemans – harmonica (7, 8)
- David Matthews – horn and rhythm arrangements (5), conductor (5)
- Don Sebesky – ensemble arrangements (7), conductor (7, 8); rhythm, string and voice arrangements (8)

=== Production ===
- Earl Klugh – producer
- Dave Palmer – recording, mixing
- Neal Bignon – assistant engineer
- Richard McKernan – assistant engineer
- Bob Ludwig – mastering at Masterdisk (New York, NY)
- Bruce Hervey – production coordination, management for E.K.I.
- Adriel Givens – photography
- Meredith Lea Bailey – art direction, design

== Charts ==
Album – Billboard
Year	Chart	Position
1991	Top Contemporary Jazz Albums	1
1991	The Billboard 200	189
1991	R&B Albums	96
