= Ultimate Earl Klugh =

Compilation album by Earl Klugh
- Released: February 20, 2007
- Genre: Crossover jazz, jazz pop, instrumental pop
- Label: Mosaic Records

Earl Klugh chronology
| Music for Lovers (2006) | Ultimate Earl Klugh (2007) | Rhino Hi-Five: Earl Klugh (2007) |

Professional ratings
Review scores
| Source | Rating |
|---|---|
| Allmusic | link |
| SoulTracks | link |

Ultimate Earl Klugh is a compilation album by Earl Klugh released in February 2007. It features songs from Klugh's over 30 years career, including songs from his debut album as well as collaborations with Bob James and George Benson.

== Track listing ==
1. "Angelina" – 4:51
2. "Living Inside Your Love" – 5:39
3. "Dr. Macumba" – 4:26
4. "Heart String" – 6:20
5. "Wishful Thinking" – 3:58
6. "Rainbow Man" – 5:23
7. "Brazilian Stomp" – 5:37
8. "Emily" – 2:47
9. "Midnight in San Juan" – 5:53
10. "Movin' On" – 4:29
11. "Jo Ann's Song" – 5:26
12. "Maybe Tonight" – 4:05
