= Life Stories (Earl Klugh album) =

Studio album by Earl Klugh
- Released: 1986
- Studios: Mediasound Studios, Sigma Sound Studios and Atlantic Studios (New York City, New York); United Sound Systems (Detroit, Michigan); Studio A (Dearborn Heights, Michigan)
- Genres: Smooth jazz, crossover jazz, jazz pop, instrumental pop
- Length: 41:47
- Label: Warner Bros.
- Producer: Earl Klugh

Earl Klugh chronology
Just Between Friends (1986)	Life Stories (1986)	Collaboration (1987)

Professional ratings
Review scores
Source	Rating
allmusic.com	3/5 stars

Life Stories is the 13th studio album by Earl Klugh released in 1986. This release, "sets Klugh`s ballads against a variety of musical backgrounds, including violins, flutes, electric guitars and a variety of synthesizers". As in some of his previous albums, Klugh is joined by David Matthews and Grammy Award winner Don Sebesky who conducted and arranged some of the songs.

== Track listing ==
Information based on Liner Notes

1. "The Traveler" (Written by Earl Klugh) - 4:07
  Strings arranged by Don Sebesky
  Synthesizer arranged by Greg Phillinganes
  Rhythm arranged by Earl Klugh, Gene Dunlap, Calvin Bryant & Thom Hall
2. "Just for Your Love"
  (James Gadson, Clarence McDonald, Alan Abrahams) - 4:13
  Strings by Don Sebesky
3. "Second Chances" (Earl Klugh) - 3:59
  Rhythm & Synthesizer arranged by Earl Klugh
  Additional Synthesizer arranged by Greg Phillinganes
4. "For the Love of You" (Ernie Isley, Marvin Isley, Chris Jasper, O'Kelly Isley, Ronald Isley, Rudolph Isley) - 3:59
  Rhythm arranged by Earl Klugh
  Strings arranged by Don Sebesky
  Synthesizer arranged by Greg Phillinganes
5. "Debra Anne" (Written and Arranged by Earl Klugh) - 3:42
6. "Santiago Sunset" (Written by Earl Klugh) - 4:33
  Chamber Ensemble arranged by Don Sebesky
7. "Sandman" (Written and Arranged by Earl Klugh) - 4:46
8. "Return of the Rainmaker" (Written by Earl Klugh) - 6:11
9. "Moon and the Stars" (Written and Arranged by Earl Klugh) - 3:32
10. "The Traveler, Pt. 2" (Written by Earl Klugh) - 2:45

Notes

- ”Just for Your Love” originally performed by The Memphis Horns
- ”For the Love of You” originally performed by The Isley Brothers

== Personnel ==
Information is based on the album's liner notes

- Earl Klugh – guitars, keyboards (3, 5), mandolin (9)
- Thom Hall – keyboards (1, 2)
- Greg Phillinganes – keyboards (1, 10), finger snaps (2), additional keyboards (3), synthesizers (4), bass synth (5)
- John Mahoney – synthesizer programming (1)
- Richard Tee – additional keyboards (2)
- Skip Anderson – keyboards (8)
- Eric Gale – additional guitars (2)
- Eric Weisberg – pedal steel guitar (5)
- Calvin Bryant – bass (1, 2)
- Luico Hopper – bass (4, 8)
- Gene Dunlap – drums (1, 2, 10), drum computer programming (3, 5)
- Buddy Williams – cymbals (3), drums (4)
- Ray Marchica – drums (8)
- Jimmy Maelen – percussion (1, 4, 10)
- Bruce Hervey – finger snaps (2)
- Errol "Crusher" Bennett – percussion (7)
- Michael Brecker – saxophone solo (8)
- Vivian Cherry – backing vocals (2, 4)
- Frank Floyd – backing vocals (2, 4), vocals (10)
- Yvonne Lewis – backing vocals (2, 4)
- Ullanda McCullough – backing vocals (2)
- Don Sebesky – string conductor (1, 2, 4, 6)
- Dave Matthews – orchestra arrangements and conductor (8)

=== Production ===
- Earl Klugh – producer
- Dave Palmer – recording, mixing
- Warren Woods – additional recording
- Fernando Kral – recording assistant, mix assistant, additional recording assistant
- Rufus Harris – additional recording assistant
- Tim Hatfield – additional recording assistant
- Ira McGlaughlin – additional recording assistant
- Jim Romero – additional recording assistant
- Bruce Smith – additional recording assistant
- Bob Ludwig – mastering at Masterdisk (New York, NY)
- Roland Wilson – production assistant, production coordinator
- Richard Snyder – photography
- Meredith Lea Bailey – art direction, design, illustration
- Bruce Hervey for E.K.I – management

== Charts ==
Album – Billboard
Year	Chart	Position
1986	Top Jazz Albums	13
1986	R&B Albums	62
1986	The Billboard 200	143
