= Crazy for You (Earl Klugh album) =

Studio album by Earl Klugh
- Released: October 1981
- Recorded: 14 January–22 May 1981
- Studio: Mediasound Studios (New York City, New York); A&M Studios (Hollywood, California)
- Genre: Jazz pop, smooth jazz
- Length: 35:12
- Label: EMI Music Distribution
- Producer: Earl Klugh; Roland Wilson

Earl Klugh chronology
Late Night Guitar (1980)	Crazy for You (1981)	Low Ride (1983)

Professional ratings
Review scores
Source	Rating
AllMusic	4/5 stars

Crazy for You is the 8th studio album by Earl Klugh, released in 1981. This is the first album which Klugh produced by himself. The album received two Grammy nominations at the 25th Grammy Awards in 1983; for Best Pop Instrumental Performance, and for Best Arrangement on an Instrumental Recording, the latter shared jointly by Klugh, keyboardist Ronnie Foster, and string arranger Clare Fischer.

== Track listing ==
All songs written by Earl Klugh.

1. "I'm Ready for Your Love" – 3:20
2. "Soft Stuff (And Other Sweet Delights)" – 5:09
3. "Twinkle" – 5:21
4. "Broadway Ramble" – 4:30
5. "Calypso Getaway" – 3:14
6. "The Rainmaker" – 5:15
7. "Balladina" – 4:19
8. "Crazy for You" – 4:04

== Personnel ==
Musicians

- Earl Klugh – acoustic nylon guitars, 12-string guitar (2, 5), clavinet (4), electric nylon guitars (4)
- Sylvester Rivers – electric piano (1)
- Greg Phillinganes – synthesizers (1, 3, 8), electric piano (3)
- Ronnie Foster – electric piano (2, 5, 7, 8), vocoder (2), acoustic piano (8)
- Darryl Dybka – ARP 16-Voice Electronic Piano (4)
- Onaje Allan Gumbs – electric piano (6)
- Ray Parker Jr. – electric guitar (1), bass (1), drums (1)
- Phil Upchurch – electric guitar (2, 5, 7, 8)
- Perry Hughes – electric guitar (4)
- Donald Griffin – electric guitar (5, 8)
- Hiram Bullock – electric guitar (6)
- Nathan East – bass (2, 5)
- Louis Johnson – bass (3)
- Mickie Roquemore – synth bass (4)
- Gary King – bass (6)
- Charles Meeks – bass (7, 8)
- Ricky Lawson – drums (2, 5)
- Raymond Pounds – drums (3)
- Gene Dunlap – drums (4)
- Brian Brake – drums (6)
- James Bradley Jr. – drums (7, 8)
- Jack Ashford – tambourine (1)
- Paulinho da Costa – percussion (2, 3, 5, 8)
- Manolo Badrena – percussion (6)
- Sammy Figueroa – percussion (6)
- Hubie Crawford – harmonica (4)

Music arrangements

- Greg Phillinganes – synthesizer arrangements (1), arrangements (3)
- Earl Klugh – rhythm arrangements (2, 5 7)
- Phil Upchurch – rhythm arrangements (2)
- Roland Wilson – rhythm arrangements (2)
- The band – arrangements (4, 8)
- David Matthews – rhythm arrangements (6)
- Ronnie Foster – rhythm arrangements (7)

Orchestra (tracks 2 & 5–8)

- Patrick Williams – arrangements and conductor (2)
- Johnny Mandel – arrangements and conductor (5)
- David Matthews – arrangements and conductor (6)
- Clare Fischer – arrangements and conductor (7, 8)
- David Nadien – concertmaster (New York)
- Gerald Vinci – concertmaster (Los Angeles)

Horns

- George Young – saxophone solos
- Sam Burtis, Jim Pugh and Dave Taylor – trombone
- Jon Faddis, John Gatchell, Jon Shepley and Lew Soloff – trumpet, flugelhorn

Strings

- Stella Castellucci – harp
- Lamar Alsop, Marilyn Baker, Dixie Blackstone, Harry Bluestone, Stuart Canin, Norman Carr, Harry Cykman, Assa Drori, Robert Dubow, Barry Finclair, Ronald Folsom, David Frisna, Pam Gates, Pamela Goldsmith, Anne Goodman, Joseph Goodman, Janice Gower, Allan Harshman, Reginald Hill, Bill Hybel, Karen Jones, Dennis Karmazyn, Ray Kelley, Myra Kestenbaum, Louis Kiveman, Raphael Kramer, Norman Leonard, Ronald Leonard, Jesse Levy, Charles Libove, Robert Lipsett, Richard Locker, Charles McCracken, Marvin Morgenstern, Wilbert Nuttycombe, Stanley Plummer, Max Pollikoff, Jerome Reisler, Nathan Ross, Sheldon Sanov, Victor Sazer, David Schwartz, Haim Shtrum, Richard Sortomme, Robert Sushel, Mari Tsumura-Botnick, Dorothy Wade, Miwako Watanabe, Herschel Wise, Helaine Wittenberg, John Wittenberg, Harold Wolf and Fred Zlotkin – string players

== Production ==
- Earl Klugh – producer, mixing
- Roland Wilson – co-producer, mixing
- Michael H. Brauer – engineer, mixing
- Don Hahn – engineer
- Jim Cassell – assistant engineer
- Andy Hoffman – assistant engineer
- Bob Ludwig – mastering at Masterdisk (New York City, New York)
- John Kosh – art direction, design
- Carol Friedman – photography
- Block-Kewley Management – management

== Charts ==
Album – Billboard
Year	Chart	Position
1981	Jazz Albums	2
1981	R&B Albums	14
1981	The Billboard 200	53
