= Nightsongs (Earl Klugh album) =

Studio album by Earl Klugh
- Released: 1984
- Studio: Mediasound Studios (New York City, New York)
- Genre: Crossover jazz; instrumental pop
- Length: 40:24
- Label: Capitol
- Producer: Earl Klugh

Earl Klugh chronology
Wishful Thinking (1984)	Nightsongs (1984)	Soda Fountain Shuffle (1985)

Professional ratings
Review scores
Source	Rating
Allmusic	Review
The Age	not rated Review

Nightsongs is an instrumental-pop studio album by Earl Klugh released in 1984. The album received a Grammy nomination for Best Pop Instrumental Performance at the 27th Grammy Awards in 1985. This release has Klugh perform "a collection of funk-free, soft melodic standards with heavy string orchestrations", featuring legendary NEA Jazz Master Jean "Toots" Thielemans on the harmonica and Grammy Award winner Don Sebesky as conductor and arranger.

== Track listing ==
1. "Ain't Misbehavin'" (Harry Brooks, Andy Razaf, Fats Waller) - 2:12
2. "Theme from The Pawnbroker" (Quincy Jones) - 4:13
3. "The Look of Love" (Burt Bacharach) - 5:28
4. "Nature Boy" (eden ahbez) - 3:51
5. "Stay Gold (Theme from The Outsiders)" (Carmine Coppola) - 2:54
6. "Night Song" (Earl Klugh) - 6:36
7. "See See Rider" (Ma Rainey) - 2:11
8. "A Certain Smile" (Sammy Fain, Paul Francis Webster) - 3:43
9. "The Shadow of Your Smile" (Johnny Mandel, Paul Francis Webster) - 5:10
10. "Theme from Picnic" (George Duning, Steve Allen) - 4:06

== Personnel ==
Musicians

- Earl Klugh – guitars
- Barry Eastmond – keyboards (3, 6, 9)
- Luico Hopper – bass (3, 6)
- Ron Carter – bass (9)
- Brian Brake – drums (3, 6)
- Grady Tate – drums (9)
- Sammy Figueroa – percussion (3, 6, 9)
- Toots Thielsman – harmonica (6)
- David Nadien – concertmaster (2, 4–6, 8, 10)

Music arrangements

- Earl Klugh – arrangements (1, 7), rhythm arrangements (3, 9)
- Don Sebesky – orchestra arrangements and conductor (2, 5, 8, 10)
- David Matthews – orchestra arrangements and conductor (4, 6)

== Production ==
- Earl Klugh – producer
- Roland Wilson – co-producer
- Dave Palmer – recording, mixing
- Andy Hoffman – assistant engineer
- Roy Kohara – art direction
- Pietro Alfieri – design
- Jerry Farber – photography

== Charts ==
Album – Billboard
Year	Chart	Position
1984	Top Jazz Albums	5
1984	R&B Albums	42
1984	The Billboard 200	107
