= Dream Come True (Earl Klugh album) =

Studio album by Earl Klugh
- Released: 1980
- Recorded: September 1979 – January 1980
- Studio: Electric Lady Studios and CBS 30th Street Studio (New York City, New York); Young 'Un Sound (Nashville, Tennessee)
- Genre: Crossover jazz, instrumental pop
- Length: 37:26
- Label: EMI Music Distribution
- Producer: Earl Klugh

Earl Klugh chronology
One on One (1979)	Dream Come True (1980)	Late Night Guitar (1980)

Professional ratings
Review scores
Source	Rating
allmusic.com	3/5 stars

Dream Come True is the 6th studio album by Earl Klugh released in 1980. The album received a Grammy nomination for Best Jazz Fusion Performance at the 23rd Grammy Awards in 1981.

== Track listing ==
All tracks composed by Earl Klugh; except where indicated

Side One

1. "If It's in Your Heart (It's in Your Smile)" – 4:04
2. "Doc" – 4:44
3. "Amazon" – 4:02
4. "I Don't Want to Leave You Alone Anymore" (lyrics: Bill Allen, George Porter Martin) – 4:53

Side Two

1. "Spellbound" – 6:13
2. "Sweet Rum and Starlight" – 4:02
3. "Dream Come True" – 3:34
4. "Message to Michael" (Burt Bacharach, Hal David) – 5:54

== Personnel ==
- Earl Klugh – guitars
- Daryl Dybuka – electric piano (1–3)
- Mickie Roquemore – clavinet (1, 3), tack piano (2), acoustic piano (3), electric piano (4, 6, 8)
- David Briggs – acoustic piano (4, 6, 8), electric piano (8)
- Perry Hughes – electric guitar (1–3)
- Greg Phillinganes – guitars (3), keyboards (5), electric piano (7)
- Reggie Young – electric guitar (4, 6, 8)
- Lloyd Green – pedal steel guitar (4, 6, 8)
- Hubie Crawford – bass (1, 2)
- Marcus Miller – bass (3)
- Mike Leech – bass (4, 6, 8)
- David Saltman – bass (7)
- Gene Dunlap – drums (1–4, 6, 8), tambourine (2)
- James Bradley Jr. – drums (5, 7)
- Leonard "Doc" Gibbs – percussion (1–4, 6)
- Krystal Davis – vocals (4)
- Frank Floyd – vocals (4)
- Yvonne Lewis – vocals (4)

Music arrangements

- David Matthews – orchestra arrangements and conductor
- Greg Phillinganes – all synthesizer arrangements

== Production ==
- Earl Klugh – producer
- Tom Bush – mixing, track recording
- Joel Cohn – track recording
- Stan Dacus – track recording
- Glenn Rieuf – track recording
- Chip Young – track recording
- Don Puluse – orchestra recording
- Roland Wilson – production consultant
- Bill Burks – art direction, design
- Jeff Lancaster – design
- Carol Wanagat – drawing
- Bob Cass – photography
- Block-Kewley Management – management

== Charts ==
Album – Billboard
Year	Chart	Position
1980	Jazz Albums	4
1980	R&B Albums	22
1980	The Billboard 200	42
