= The Journey (Earl Klugh album) =

Studio album by Earl Klugh
- Released: August 5, 1997
- Recorded: 1997
- Studio: Studio A (Dearborn Heights, Michigan); Vanguard Studios (Detroit, Michigan); Record One (Los Angeles, California); Capitol Studios and Sunset Sound Recorders (Hollywood, California)
- Genre: Smooth jazz, crossover jazz
- Length: 51:29
- Label: Warner Bros.
- Producer: Earl Klugh

Earl Klugh chronology
Sudden Burst of Energy (1996)	The Journey (1997)	Peculiar Situation (1999)

Professional ratings
Review scores
Source	Rating
Allmusic	2.5/5 stars

The Journey is a smooth jazz studio album by Earl Klugh released in 1997. The album stayed on the Billboard Top Contemporary Jazz Albums charts for several weeks at No 6. This was the final album that Klugh recorded for Warner Bros. Records.

== Track listing ==
All tracks composed by Earl Klugh

1. "All Through the Night" - 5:13
2. "Last Song" - 4:28
3. "4 Minute Samba" - 3:58
4. "Sneakin' Out of Here" - 5:05
5. "The Journey" - 6:10
6. "Good as It Gets" - 4:18
7. "Fingerdance" - 5:53
8. "Evil Eye" - 6:19
9. "Walk in the Sun" - 3:58
10. "Autumn Song" - 6:07

== Personnel ==
- Earl Klugh – guitars, keyboards (2, 6, 7), acoustic piano (6), synthesizers (10)
- Greg Phillinganes – keyboards (1, 4, 5), acoustic piano (4, 5), electric piano (6)
- David Spradley – acoustic piano (1–3), electric piano (1, 2), keyboards (2, 3, 9)
- Luis Resto – keyboards (2, 7, 8), acoustic piano (7, 8)
- Albert Duncan – keyboards (10), acoustic piano (10)
- Doc Powell – rhythm guitar (2), additional drum programming (2)
- Paul Jackson, Jr. – electric guitar (4, 8, 9)
- Al Turner – bass
- Ron Otis – drums (1, 3, 6, 8, 9)
- Gene Dunlap – drum programming (2)
- Harvey Mason – drums (4, 5, 7, 10)
- Paulinho da Costa – percussion (1, 3–10)
- Ray Manzerolle – wind synthesizer (1, 3, 4, 6, 9)
- Lenny Price – saxophone (2)
- Johnny Mandel – orchestral arrangements and conductor (5, 10)
- Eddie "Key" Bullard – vocals (2)

== Production ==
- Earl Klugh – producer
- Bruce Hervey – production coordinator, management for E.K.I.
- Meredith Lea Bailey – art direction, design, illustration
- James Chen – photography
- Maya Robledo – stylist

Technical credits

- Bob Ludwig – mastering at Gateway Mastering (Portland, Maine)
- David Palmer – recording (1–3, 6–10)
- Don Murray – mixing (1, 3–5, 7–10), recording (4, 5), orchestra recording (5, 10)
- Gerard Smerak – mixing (2, 6)
- Todd Fairall – recording assistant (1–3, 6–10)
- Doug Bohem – mix assistant (1, 3–5, 7–10)
- Greg Henley – mix assistant (2, 6)
- Eddie Miller – recording assistant (4, 5)
- Rail Rogut – recording assistant (4, 5)
- Peter Doell – orchestra recording assistant (5, 10)

== Charts ==
Album – Billboard
Year	Chart	Position
1997	Top Contemporary Jazz Albums	6
