= The Spice of Life (Earl Klugh album) =

Studio album by Earl Klugh
- Released: April 28, 2008
- Studio: Studio A (Dearborn Heights, Michigan); Bennett Studios (Englewood, New Jersey); Nola Recording Studios (New York City, New York); Doppler Studios, Southern Tracks and 861 Productions (Atlanta, Georgia); Sound Emporium Studios (Nashville, Tennessee)
- Genre: Smooth jazz
- Length: 58:13
- Label: Koch Records
- Producer: Earl Klugh

Earl Klugh chronology
Naked Guitar (2005)	The Spice of Life (2008)	HandPicked (2013)

Professional ratings
Review scores
Source	Rating
AllMusic	3.5/5 stars
The Washington Post	(favourable)
Pittsburgh Post-Gazette	4/4 stars

The Spice of Life is a smooth jazz studio album by Earl Klugh released in April 2008. The album received a Grammy nomination for Best Pop Instrumental Album at the 51st Grammy Awards in 2009.

== Critical reception ==
Mark Keresman of AllMusic, in a 3.5/5 stars review, claimed, "Smooth jazz guitarist Earl Klugh’s SPICE OF LIFE shows that he hasn’t lost any of his mellow flair...Variety, in this case, is the SPICE OF LIFE--Klugh effortlessly mixes straight-up jazz (a Thelonious Monk classic getting a Brazilian makeover), romantic R&B, chilled-out balladry, pop, and a touch of funk."

Rick Nowlin of the Pittsburgh Post-Gazette, in a 4/4 stars review, praised the album saying, "I've listened to a lot of the Detroit-born-and-bred acoustic guitarist, over the past three decades, both live and on record, and I must admit I've never heard him sound this good...I can only saw WoW."

== Track listing ==
All songs written by Earl Klugh, except where noted.

1. "Ocean Blue" - 5:10
2. "Sleepyhead" - 5:09
3. "Canadian Sunset" (Norman Gimbel, Eddie Heywood) - 5:34
4. "Venezuelan Nights" - 2:35
5. "Driftin'" - 3:48
6. "Snap!" (Earl Klugh, Al Turner) - 4:41
7. "Bye Ya" (Thelonious Monk) - 3:59
8. "Heart of My Life" - 4:14
9. "Morning in Rio" - 5:27
10. "C'est si bon" (Henri Betti, André Hornez, Jerry Seelen)- 4:53
11. "Lucy's World" - 3:49
12. "My Foolish Heart" (Catherine Hinen, Ned Washington, Victor Young) - 6:18
13. "The Toy Guitar" - 2:36

== Personnel ==
- Earl Klugh – acoustic guitars, rhythm arrangements (8), keyboards (9, 11), synthesizers (9, 11), percussion (11)
- David Spradley – keyboards (2, 6, 9), synthesizers (2, 6, 9)
- John Corrozzu – keyboards (5, 9), synthesizers (5, 9)
- Jeff Cox – acoustic bass (1, 3, 7, 10–12)
- Al Turner – electric string bass (2), electric bass (6, 9)
- Joe Reda – electric bass (5)
- Yonrico Scott – drums (1, 3, 7, 10, 12), percussion (5, 9, 11)
- Ron Otis – drums (2, 6, 9)
- Gene Dunlap – drum programming (2, 6, 9)
- Scott Meeder – drums (5), percussion (5, 9, 11)
- Bert Elliott – percussion (11)
- Lenny Price – wind synthesizer (2, 11), saxophone (6)

Chamber group on "Heart of My Life"

- Eddie Horst – arrangements and conductor
- Carl Nitchie – bassoon
- Ann E. Lilya – oboe
- Brice Andrus – French horn
- Daniel Laufer – cello
- William Paul Murphy – viola

Orchestra (Tracks 1, 3, 7, 10 & 12)

- Don Sebesky – orchestra arrangements and conductor
- Earl Klugh – rhythm arrangements
- John Miller – music coordinator

Flutes

- Bob Bush – alto flute, bass flute
- Hubert Laws – alto flute, bass flute, C flute
- Pamela Sklar – alto flute, bass flute, C flute
- Keith Underwood – alto flute, bass flute, contrabass flute

Percussion

- Gordon Gottlieb – vibraphone, shakers, mark tree

Strings

- Laura Bontrager, Richard Locker and Sarah Siever – cello
- Grace Paradise – harp
- Kenji Bunch, Maxine Roach and Deborah Shufelt – viola
- Martin Agee, Cenovia Cummins, Eric Degioia, Rick Dolan, Cecilia Hobbs Gardner, Karen Karlsrud, Helen Kim, Laura Oatts, Carol Pool, Rob Shaw, Dale Stuckenbruck and Una Tone – violin

== Production ==
- Earl Klugh – producer
- Gene Dunlap – associate producer (2, 6, 9)
- Audrey Birnbaum – production coordinator
- Denise Waichunas – production coordinator
- Matchstic – design
- Sandee Oliver – cover photography
- Teresa DeLappe – inlay sleeve photography, photo of Lucy

Technical credits

- Alan Silverman – mastering at Arf! Mastering (New York, NY)
- Gary Chester – mixing
- Bert Elliott – guitar engineer, additional tracking (5, 6, 9)
- Jim Czak – orchestra engineer (1, 3, 7, 10, 12)
- Logan Patton – rhythm section engineer (1, 3, 7, 10, 12)
- Eric Morgeson – rhythm section engineer (2, 6, 9, 11)
- Tom Tapley – rhythm section engineer (5, 6, 9, 11)
- Nev Walker – rhythm section engineer (8)
- Al Perotta – mix assistant
- Kyle Ford – assistant engineer (1, 3, 7, 10, 12)
- Bill Moss – assistant engineer (1, 3, 7, 10, 12)
- Todd Fairall – assistant engineer (2, 6, 9, 11)
- Tony Rizzo – assistant engineer (2, 6, 9, 11)
- Darren Tablan – assistant engineer (5, 6, 9, 11)

== Charts ==
Album – Billboard
Year	Chart	Position
2008	Top Contemporary Jazz	4
2009	Jazz Albums	8
