= Sudden Burst of Energy =

Studio album by Earl Klugh
- Released: 1996
- Studio: Studio A (Dearborn Heights, Michigan)
- Genre: Smooth jazz, crossover jazz, jazz pop, instrumental pop
- Length: 48:16
- Label: Warner Bros.
- Producer: Earl Klugh

Earl Klugh chronology
Move (1994)	Sudden Burst of Energy (1996)	The Journey (1997)

Professional ratings
Review scores
Source	Rating
allmusic.com	3/5 stars

Sudden Burst of Energy is a smooth jazz studio album by Earl Klugh released in 1996. In this release, Klugh is "joined by a large rhythm section plus an occasional saxophonist".

== Track listing ==
All tracks composed by Earl Klugh

1. "Happy Song" - 4:44
2. "Maybe Tonight" - 4:02
3. "Sunset Island" - 4:24
4. "I'll Be Waiting" - 4:46
5. "The Wiggle" - 6:04
6. "By the Sea" - 4:25
7. "Only You" - 4:13
8. "Slow Boat to Rio" - 4:10
9. "I'll Be Waiting (Reprise)" - 2:11
10. "Till the End of Time" - 4:48
11. "Open Road" - 4:27

== Personnel ==
- Earl Klugh – guitars (1–8, 10, 11), keyboards (2, 5, 6, 9, 10), electric piano (4), acoustic piano (9)
- Barnaby Finch – keyboards (1)
- Ronnie Foster – keyboards (1)
- Luis Resto – keyboards (1, 3, 4, 7, 8, 11), acoustic piano (3, 4, 7, 8, 11)
- Vernon Fails – keyboards (6), acoustic piano (6)
- Thom Hall – keyboards (11)
- Reggie McTaw – rhythm guitar (5)
- Al Turner – bass (1–8, 11)
- Harvey Mason – drums (1)
- Gene Dunlap – drums (2–5, 7, 8, 10, 11), percussion (2–5, 10)
- Ron Otis – drums (6)
- Paulinho da Costa – percussion (1, 2)
- Marlon Crawford – congas (3, 4, 7, 11)
- Lorenzo Brown – congas (8)
- Mario Resto – timbales (8)
- Lenny Price – saxophone (1, 2, 5)
- Ray Manzerolle – saxophone (6)
- Eddie Bullard – vocals (5)

== Production ==
- Earl Klugh – producer
- Dave Palmer – recording
- Randy Poole – recording, recording assistant
- Todd Fairall – recording assistant
- Don Murray – mixing at Capitol Studios and Sunset Sound Recorders (Hollywood, California)
- Mike Kloster – mix assistant
- Bill Smith – mix assistant
- Wally Traugott – mastering at Tower Mastering (Hollywood, California)
- Gene Dunlap – production consultant
- Bruce Hervey – production coordinator, management for E.K.I
- Lee Ward – photography
- Meredith Lea Bailey – art direction, design, illustration
- Belen – stylist

== Charts ==
Album – Billboard
Year	Chart	Position
1996	Top Contemporary Jazz Albums	10
