= Sounds and Visions =

Studio album by The Earl Klugh Trio
- Released: 1993
- Recorded: 1993
- Studio: Studio A (Dearborn Heights, Michigan); Abbey Road Studios (London, UK)
- Genre: Smooth jazz, crossover jazz, film music, instrumental pop
- Length: 54:53
- Label: Warner Bros.
- Producer: Earl Klugh

The Earl Klugh Trio chronology
The Earl Klugh Trio, Vol 1 (1991)	Sounds and Visions (1993)

Professional ratings
Review scores
Source	Rating
allmusic.com	2.5/5 stars
New Straits Times	2.5/5 stars

Sounds and Visions is the second studio album by The Earl Klugh Trio released in 1993. In this release, the Trio (Earl Klugh on guitar, Ralphe Armstrong on bass, Gene Dunlap on drums) is joined by the London Philharmonic Orchestra conducted by Grammy Award winner Don Sebesky. The album features movie themes preceded by short orchestral interludes.

== Track listing ==
1. "Prelude" - 0:38
2. "Goldfinger" - 4:55
3. "Orchestra Intro" - 1:13
4. "Maybe September (From the Motion Picture The Oscar)" - 3:22
5. "Orchestra Intro" - 1:11
6. "Theme from The Cincinnati Kid" - 4:55
7. "Orchestra Intro" - 0:49
8. "Secret Love (From the Motion Picture Calamity Jane)" - 6:58
9. "Jo Ann's Song (From the Motion Picture Tequila Sunrise)" - 5:27
10. "Now We're One (From the Motion Picture Truck Turner)" - 5:19
11. "Interlude in E" - 0:41
12. "Barefoot in the Park" - 3:36
13. "Orchestra Intro" - 0:29
14. "His Eyes, Her Eyes (From the Motion Picture The Thomas Crown Affair)" - 4:36
15. "Love Theme from The Carpetbaggers" - 5:14
16. "Interlude in F" - 0:34
17. "Theme from The Deadly Affair" - 3:49
18. "Postlude" - 1:07

== Personnel ==
Earl Klugh Trio

- Earl Klugh – guitars
- Ralphe Armstrong – bass
- Gene Dunlap – drums

With:

- The Royal Philharmonic Orchestra
- Don Sebesky – arrangements and conductor

== Production ==
- Earl Klugh – producer
- Dave Palmer – engineer, mixing
- Ashley Alexander – assistant engineer
- Darren Godwin – assistant engineer
- Randy Poole – assistant engineer
- Bob Ludwig – mastering at Masterdisk (New York, NY)
- Bruce Hervey – production coordinator
- Meredith Lea Bailey – art direction, design
- Les Ward – photography

== Charts ==
Album – Billboard
Year	Chart	Position
1993	Top Jazz Albums	6
