= Wishful Thinking (Earl Klugh album) =

Studio album by Earl Klugh
- Released: 1984
- Recorded: October–November 1983
- Studio: Mediasound Studios (New York City, New York); A&M Studios (Hollywood, California)
- Genre: Smooth jazz; crossover jazz; instrumental pop
- Length: 35:40
- Label: EMI Music Distribution
- Producer: Earl Klugh; Roland Wilson

Earl Klugh chronology
Low Ride (1983)	Wishful Thinking (1984)	Nightsongs (1984)

Professional ratings
Review scores
Source	Rating
allmusic.com	3.5/5 stars

Wishful Thinking is the 10th studio album by Earl Klugh released in 1984, and is the final album which Klugh recorded for Capitol Records. The album represents a summation of Klugh as a guitarist and composer, and features a variety of musical styles, including pop, classical, jazz, blues, reggae and funk. The songs are texturally orchestrated with strings and harps, conducted and arranged by Johnny Mandel, David Matthews and Grammy Award winner Don Sebesky. Saxophonist David Sanborn joins Klugh on the song "The Only One for Me" on alto saxophone.

== Track listing ==
All songs written by Earl Klugh.

1. "Wishful Thinking" - 3:58
2. "Tropical Legs" - 5:33
3. "All the Time" - 4:39
4. "A Natural Thing" - 2:55
5. "Once Again" - 4:18
6. "Take It from the Top" - 3:58
7. "The Only One for Me" - 4:49
8. "Right from the Start" - 5:30

== Personnel ==
Musicians

- Earl Klugh – guitars, acoustic piano (5)
- Barry Eastmond – keyboards (1, 2, 5–8)
- Ronnie Foster – keyboards (3)
- Eric Gale – electric guitar (1)
- Carlos Rios – electric guitar (2)
- Donald Griffin – electric guitar (3)
- Phil Upchurch – electric guitar (3)
- Joe Beck – electric guitar (6, 8)
- Luico Hopper – bass (1, 2, 5, 7, 8)
- Charles Meeks – bass (3)
- Ron Carter – bass (6)
- Ted Thomas Jr. – drums (1, 2, 5, 7)
- James Bradley Jr. – drums (3)
- Brian Brake – drums (6, 8)
- Sammy Figueroa – percussion (1, 2, 5–8)
- Paulinho da Costa – percussion (3)
- David Sanborn – saxophone (7)

Music arrangements

- Earl Klugh – rhythm arrangements
- Johnny Mandel – orchestrations and conductor (3)
- David Matthews – orchestrations and conductor (4, 8), rhythm arrangements (6, 8)
- Don Sebesky – orchestrations and conductor (5)

== Production ==
- Earl Klugh – producer, mixing (3)
- Ronnie Wilson – co-producer
- Dave Palmer – recording (1, 2, 4–8), mixing
- Don Hahn – recording (3)
- Andy Hoffman – assistant engineer (1, 2, 4–8)
- Jim Cassell – assistant engineer (3)
- Pete Parsons – design
- Jerry Farber – photography

== Charts ==
Album – Billboard
Year	Chart	Position
1984	Top Jazz Albums	1
1984	R&B Albums	18
1984	The Billboard 200	69

== Pop Culture ==
"Take It from the Top" from Earl Klugh's 1984 album, Wishful Thinking, was used as the theme for CBS Sports' PGA Tour coverage from 1985 through 1990.
