= Grammy Award for Best Pop Instrumental Performance =

Former American music award

- Awarded for: quality instrumental pop performances
- Country: United States
- Presented by: National Academy of Recording Arts and Sciences
- First award: 1969
- Final award: 2011
- Currently held by: Jeff Beck, "Nessun Dorma" (2011)
- Website: grammy.com

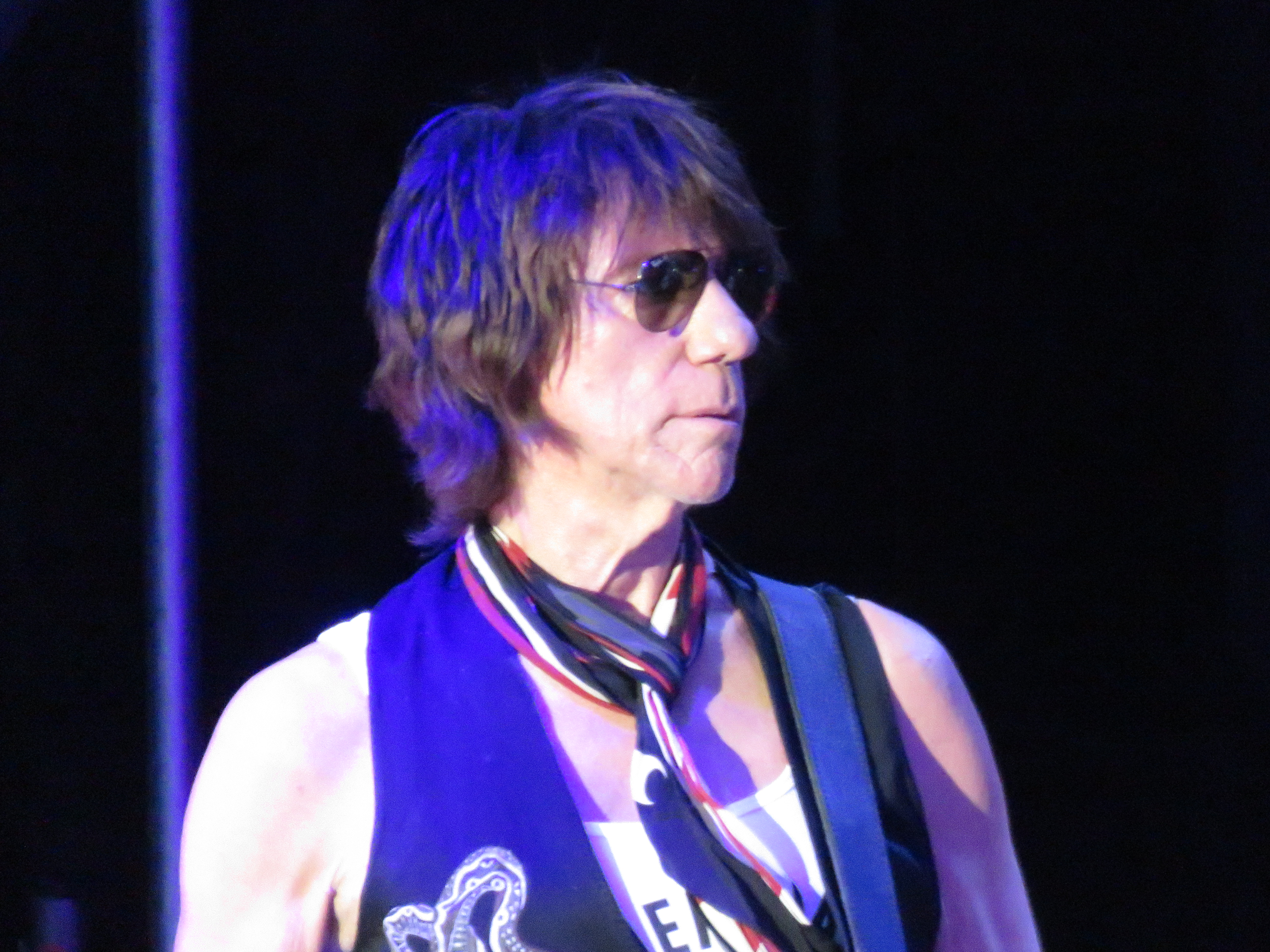
Jeff Beck at Live at Chelsea, Royal Chelsea Hospital, June 2018

The Grammy Award for Best Pop Instrumental Performance was awarded between 1969 and 2011.

- In 1969 it was awarded as Best Contemporary-Pop Performance, Instrumental
- From 1970 to 1971 it was awarded as Best Contemporary Instrumental Performance
- In 1972 it was awarded as Best Pop Instrumental Performance
- In 1973 it was awarded as Best Pop Instrumental Performance by an Instrumental Performer
- From 1974 to 1975 it was again awarded as Best Pop Instrumental Performance
- From 1986 to 1989 it was awarded as Best Pop Instrumental Performance (Orchestra, Group or Soloist)
- Since 1990 it has again been awarded as Best Pop Instrumental Performance
- The award was discontinued from 2011 in a major overhaul of Grammy categories. From 2012, all instrumental performances in the pop category (solo or with a duo/group) were shifted to either the newly formed Best Pop Solo Performance or Best Pop Duo/Group Performance categories.

A similar award for Best Instrumental Performance was awarded from 1965 to 1968. This was also in the pop field, but did not specify pop music.

== Recipients ==
Year^{[I]}	Performing artist(s)	Work	Nominees	Ref.
1969	Mason Williams	"Classical Gas"	Wes Montgomery — "Eleanor Rigby"; Hugh Masekela — Grazing in the Grass; José Feliciano — "Here, There and Everywhere"; Hugo Montenegro — "The Good, the Bad, and the Ugly"	
1970	Blood, Sweat & Tears	"Variations on a Theme by Erik Satie"	Area Code 615 — "Area Code 615"; Boots Randolph — With Love; Ferrante & Teicher — "Midnight Cowboy"; Henry Mancini — "A Time for Us (Love Theme from Romeo and Juliet)"	
1971	Henry Mancini	Theme from Z and Other Film Music	Vincent Bell — "Airport Love Theme"; Assembled Multitude — Overture from Tommy; Quincy Jones — "Soul Flower"; Jimi Hendrix — "The Star-Spangled Banner"	
1972	Quincy Jones	Smackwater Jack	Burt Bacharach — Burt Bacharach; Henry Mancini — Theme from Love Story; Peter Nero — "Theme from Summer of '42 (The Summer Knows)"; Michel Legrand — "Theme from Summer of '42 (The Summer Knows)"	
1973	Billy Preston	"Outa-Space"	Pipes & Drums & Military Band of the Royal Scots Dragoon Guards — "Amazing Grace"; Doc Severinsen — Doc; Apollo 100 — "Joy"; Mahavishnu Orchestra with John McLaughlin — "The Inner Mounting Flame"	
1974	Eumir Deodato	"Also Sprach Zarathustra (2001)"	Mahavishnu Orchestra — "Birds of Fire"; Edgar Winter — Frankenstein; Billy Preston — "Space Race"; Quincy Jones — "You've Got It Bad Girl"	
1975	Marvin Hamlisch	"The Entertainer"	Quincy Jones — "Along Came Betty"; Herbie Hancock — Head Hunters; Rick Wakeman — "Journey to the Centre of the Earth"; Love Unlimited Orchestra — "Rhapsody in White"	
1976	Van McCoy	"The Hustle"	The Ritchie Family — "Brazil"; Chuck Mangione — Chase the Clouds Away; Mike Post — "The Rockford Files"; Tom Scott & the L.A. Express — "Tom Cat"	
1977	George Benson	Breezin'	Walter Murphy & the Big Apple Band — "A Fifth of Beethoven"; The Brecker Brothers — Back to Back; Stevie Wonder — "Contusion"; Jeff Beck — Wired	
1978	John Williams & the London Symphony Orchestra	Star Wars	Maynard Ferguson — "Gonna Fly Now (Theme from Rocky)"; Bill Conti — "Gonna Fly Now (Theme from Rocky)"; Barry De Vorzon — "Nadia's Theme (The Young and the Restless)"; Meco — "Star Wars Theme/Cantina Band"	
1979	Chuck Mangione	Children of Sanchez	Chet Atkins, Les Paul — "Guitar Monsters"; Zubin Mehta conducting the Los Angeles Philharmonic — Star Wars and Close Encounters of the Third Kind; Henry Mancini — "The Pink Panther Theme ('78)"; John Williams — Close Encounters of the Third Kind	
1980	Herb Alpert	"Rise"	Chuck Mangione — An Evening of Magic; Zubin Mehta with the New York Philharmonic — Manhattan; Frank Mills — "Music Box Dancer"; John Williams — "Theme from Superman"	
1981	Bob James and Earl Klugh	One on One	Herb Alpert — Beyond; The Doobie Brothers — "South Bay Strut"; Henry Mancini — "Ravel's Bolero"; John Williams and the London Symphony Orchestra —"Yoda's Theme"	
1982	Larry Carlton and Mike Post	"The Theme From Hill Street Blues"	Quincy Jones — "Velas"; Earl Klugh — Late Night Guitar; Lee Ritenour — Rit; Royal Philharmonic Orchestra — "Hooked on Classics"	
1983	Ernie Watts	"Chariots of Fire Theme (Dance Version)"	Louis Clark conducting the Royal Philharmonic Orchestra — Hooked on Classics; Earl Klugh — Crazy for You; David Sanborn — As We Speak; John Williams — E.T. the Extra-Terrestrial	
1984	George Benson	"Being with You"	Herb Alpert — "Blow Your Own Horn"; Joe Jackson — "Breakdown"; Larry Carlton — "Friends"; Helen St. John — "Love Theme from Flashdance"	
1985	Ray Parker Jr.	"Ghostbusters (Instrumental)"	Earl Klugh — Nightsongs; Steve Mitchell, Richard Perry and Howard Rice — "Jump (For My Love)"; Randy Newman — The Natural; Stevie Wonder — "I Just Called to Say I Love You"	
1986	Jan Hammer	"Miami Vice Theme"	Harold Faltermeyer — "Axel F"; David Foster — "Love Theme from St. Elmo's Fire"; Dave Grusin and Lee Ritenour — Harlequin; Spyro Gyra — "Shake Down"	
1987	Harold Faltermeyer and Steve Stevens	"Top Gun Anthem"	Stanley Clarke — "Overjoyed"; David Foster — David Foster; Genesis — "The Brazilian"; The Tonight Show Band — "Johnny's Theme"	
1988	Larry Carlton	"Minute by Minute"	Herb Alpert — Keep Your Eye on Me; The Art of Noise — "Dragnet"; Chick Corea Elektric Band — "Light Years"; Dave Grusin — "It Might Be You"	
1989	David Sanborn	Close-Up	Kenny G — "Silhouette"; MARRS — "Pump Up the Volume"; Mike Post — Music from L.A., Law & Otherwise; Joe Satriani — "Always with Me, Always with You"	
1990	The Neville Brothers	"Healing Chant"	Kenny G — "Breadline Blues"; Earl Klugh — Whispers and Promises; Paul Shaffer — "Late Night"; Andreas Vollenweider — "Dancing with the Lion"	
1991	Angelo Badalamenti	"Twin Peaks Theme"	Kenny G — "Going Home"; Phil Collins — "Saturday Night and Sunday Morning"; Quincy Jones — "Setembro (Brazilian Wedding Song)"; Stanley Jordan — "What's Goin' On"	
1992	Michael Kamen	Robin Hood: Prince of Thieves	Candy Dulfer — Saxuality; Kenny G — "Theme from Dying Young"; David Grusin — Havana; John Williams — The Star Wars Trilogy	
1993	Richard Kaufman	"Beauty and the Beast"	The Chieftains and Chet Atkins — "Tahitian Skies"; Bruce Hornsby and Branford Marsalis — "Twenty Nine-Five"; Bob James and Earl Klugh — Cool; John Williams — Hook	
1994	Branford Marsalis and Bruce Hornsby	"Barcelona Mona"	George Benson — "Got to Be There"; Kenny G — "Forever in Love"; James Galway — "Beauty and the Beast"; Anthony Inglis with the London Symphony Orchestra — "The Phantom of the Opera"	
1995	Booker T. & the M.G.'s	"Cruisin'"	Kenny G — "Sentimental"; Branford Marsalis and Bruce Hornsby — "The Star-Spangled Banner"; Mike Post — "Theme from NYPD Blue"; Alan Silvestri — "I'm Forrest...Forrest Gump (The Feather Theme)"	
1996	Los Lobos	"Mariachi Suite"	The Allman Brothers Band — "In Memory of Elizabeth Reed"; Bruce Hornsby — "Song B"; Kenny G — "Have Yourself a Merry Little Christmas"; Dave Grusin — "Yesterday"	
1997	Béla Fleck and the Flecktones	"The Sinister Minister"	Adam Clayton and Larry Mullen — "Theme from Mission: Impossible"; Lalo Schifrin with the London Philharmonic Orchestra — "Theme from Mission: Impossible"; The Smashing Pumpkins — "Mellon Collie and the Infinite Sadness"; Stevie Wonder — "Kiss Long Good Bye"	
1998	Sarah McLachlan	"Last Dance"	George Benson — "Song for My Brother"; The Chieftains — "An Gaoth Arenas"; Kenny G — "Havana"; Grover Washington, Jr. — "Soulful Strut"	
1999	The Brian Setzer Orchestra	"Sleepwalk"	The Dust Brothers — "The X-Files"; Béla Fleck and the Flecktones — "Big Country"; Kenny G — "My Heart Will Go On"; Pat Metheny Group — "Follow Me"	
2000	Santana	"El Farol"	Herb Alpert — "The Look of Love; Jeff Beck — "A Day in the Life"; Bruce Hornsby — "Song C"; Willie Nelson — "Night and Day"	
2001	The Brian Setzer Orchestra	"Caravan"	Björk — "Overture (Selmasongs)"; The Corrs — "Rebel Heart"; Béla Fleck and the Flecktones — "Zona Mona"; Grover Washington, Jr. — "Camaleao"	
2002	Eric Clapton	"Reptile"	Larry Carlton and Steve Lukather — "Room 335"; Daft Punk — "Short Circuit"; Eric Johnson — "Rain"; Kirk Whalum — "There You'll Be"	
2003	B. B. King	"Auld Lang Syne"	Dave Koz and Jeff Koz — "Blackbird"; Pat Metheny Group — "As It Is"; Moby — "18"; Kirk Whalum — "Playing with Fire"	
2004	George Harrison	"Marwa Blues"	Ry Cooder and Manuel Galbán — "Patricia"; Dave Koz — "Honey-Dipped"; Randy Newman — "Seabiscuit"; The Brian Setzer Orchestra — "The Nutcracker Suite"	
2005	Ben Harper	"11th Commandment"	Herb Alpert, Russ Freeman, James Genus, Gene Lake and Jason Miles — "Chasing Shadows"; George Benson — "Take You Out"; Bruce Hornsby — "Song F"; Brian Setzer — "Rat Pack Boogie"	
2006	Les Paul	"Caravan"	Burt Bacharach and Chris Botti — "In Our Time"; George Duke — "T-Jam"; Herbie Hancock and Trey Anastasio — "Gelo na Montanha"; Daniel Lanois — "Agave"	
2007	George Benson and Al Jarreau	"Mornin'"	Enya — "Drifting"; Béla Fleck and the Flecktones — "Subterfuge"; Bruce Hornsby — "Song H"; The Brian Setzer Orchestra — "My Favorite Things"	
2008	Joni Mitchell	"One Week Last Summer"	Beastie Boys — "Off the Grid"; Ben Harper & The Innocent Criminals — "Paris Sunshine #7"; Dave Koz — "Over the Rainbow"; Spyro Gyra — "Simple Pleasures"	
2009	Eagles	"I Dreamed There Was No War"	Steve Cropper and Felix Cavaliere — "Love Appetite"; Fourplay — "Fortune Teller"; Stanley Jordan — "Steppin' Out"; Marcus Miller — "Blast!"	
2010	Béla Fleck	"Throw Down Your Heart"	Herb Alpert — Bésame Mucho; Imogen Heap — "The Fire"; Maxwell — "Phoenix Rise"; Marcus Miller — "Funk Joint"	
2011	Jeff Beck	"Nessun Dorma"	Laurie Anderson — "Flow"; Stanley Clarke — "No Mystery"; Gorillaz — "Orchestral Intro"; The Brian Setzer Orchestra — "Sleepwalk"	

- ^{^[I]} Each year is linked to the article about the Grammy Awards held that year.

== See also ==
- List of Grammy Award categories
- Grammy Award for Best Instrumental Performance
