= Move (Earl Klugh album) =

Studio album by Earl Klugh
- Released: 1994
- Studio: Studio A (Dearborn Heights, Michigan)
- Genre: Crossover jazz, jazz pop, instrumental pop
- Length: 51:53
- Label: Warner Bros.
- Producer: Earl Klugh

Earl Klugh chronology
Midnight in San Juan (1990)	Move (1994)	Sudden Burst of Energy (1996)

Professional ratings
Review scores
Source	Rating
Allmusic	Review
JazzTimes	(not rated) Review

Move is the 17th studio album by Earl Klugh released in 1994.

== Track listing ==
All tracks composed by Earl Klugh

1. "Across the Sand" - 5:08
2. "Move" - 4:43
3. "Far from Home" - 5:29
4. "Tiptoe'in" - 5:11
5. "Nightwalk" - 6:18
6. "Face in the Wind" - 4:21
7. "Big Turtle River" - 4:14
8. "Highway Song" - 5:19
9. "Winter Rain" - 3:55
10. "Doin' It" - 5:05
11. "Across the Sand, Part II" - 2:10

== Personnel ==
Musicians

- Earl Klugh – keyboards (1, 3–5, 7, 9–11), guitars, mandolin (1, 4), organ (2), acoustic piano (6)
- Albert Duncan – keyboards (2)
- Thom Hall – keyboards (8)
- David Spradley – acoustic piano (8)
- Perry Hughes – rhythm guitar (2, 3, 10)
- Randy Jacobs – rhythm guitar (5)
- Chuck Silva – electric guitar (10)
- Greg Phillinganes – synth bass (1), keyboards (5, 6)
- Jimmie Ali – bass (2–4, 7, 8)
- Ralphe Armstrong – bass (9)
- Gene Dunlap – drums, percussion (1–7, 9–11)
- Larry Fratangelo – percussion (2)
- Lorenzo Brown – percussion (8)
- Ray Manzarolle – saxophone (2, 4, 8), EWI controller (3, 8)

Vocalists

- Fred Hammond – vocal arrangements (1, 11)
- Commissioned (Fred Hammond, Mitchell Jones, Karl Reid & Marvin Sapp) – vocals (1, 11)
- Kayla Parker – additional vocals (1, 11)
- Parkes Stewart – additional vocals (1, 11)
- Mary Thomas – additional vocals (1, 11)
- Eddie "Key" Bullard – vocals (4–6, 10)
- Kimmie Horne – vocals (4)
- D'Wayne Whitehead – vocals (6)
- Kymberli Wright – vocals (6, 10)

== Production ==
- Earl Klugh – producer
- Dave Palmer – recording
- Randy Poole – recording assistant, sound design
- Don Murray – mixing at Sunset Sound Recorders (Hollywood, California)
- Mike Kloster – mix assistant
- Andre Pegus – digital editing
- Wally Traugott – mastering
- Tower Mastering (Hollywood, California) – editing and mastering location
- Gene Dunlap – production consultant
- Bruce Hervey – production coordinator, management for E.K.I.
- Les Ward – photography
- Meredith Lea Bailey – art direction, design
- Belen – stylist

== Charts ==
Album – Billboard
Year	Chart	Position
1994	Top Contemporary Jazz Albums	6
