= Heart String =

Studio album by Earl Klugh
- Released: 1979
- Recorded: October–November 1978
- Studio: Electric Lady Studios (New York City, New York)
- Genre: Crossover jazz, jazz pop, instrumental pop
- Length: 40:21
- Label: Blue Note
- Producer: Earl Klugh

Earl Klugh chronology
Magic in Your Eyes (1978)	Heart String (1979)	One on One with Bob James (1979)

Professional ratings
Review scores
Source	Rating
allmusic.com	3/5 stars

Heart String is the fifth studio album by Earl Klugh released in 1979.

== Track listing ==
All tracks written by Earl Klugh except where noted.

1. "Heart String" – 6:23
2. "I'll See You Again" – 5:52
3. "Acoustic Lady, Part 1 & 2" – 7:43
4. "Spanish Night" – 3:18
5. "Pretty World" (Antonio Adolfo, Alan Bergman, Tiberio Gaspar)– 4:47
6. "Waiting for Cathy" – 2:50
7. "Rayna" – 5:15
8. "Heart String (Reprise)" – 4:03

== Personnel ==
Musicians

- Earl Klugh – acoustic guitar (1–5, 7, 8), steel string guitar (1, 4, 6), electric guitar (2), the "guitar choir" (4), acoustic nylon guitar (6), high-string nylon guitar (6)
- Greg Phillinganes – electric piano (1, 2, 7), clavinet (1), acoustic piano (4)
- Mickie Roquemore – clavinet (2, 3, 5), acoustic piano (3, 5)
- Darryl Dybka – electric piano (3, 5)
- Phil Upchurch – electric guitar (1–3)
- Charles Meeks – electric bass (1, 2, 4), bass (7)
- Hubie Crawford – bass (3), electric bass (3, 5)
- Roland Wilson – electric bass (5)
- Victor Lewis – drums (1, 2, 4, 7)
- Gene Dunlap – drums (3, 5)
- Ralph MacDonald – percussion (1, 2, 4, 5, 7)
- David Nadien – concertmaster (8)

Music arrangements

- Greg Phillinganes – rhythm arrangements (2, 4)
- David Matthews – string arrangements (2, 3, 7, 8), string conductor (8), orchestral arrangements and conductor
- Earl Klugh – rhythm arrangements (3–5, 7)
- Mickie Roquemore – rhythm arrangements (3)
- Darryl Dybka – rhythm arrangements (5)
- Gene Dunlap – rhythm arrangements (5)

== Production ==
- Earl Klugh – producer
- Dave Palmer – recording, mixing
- Joel Cohn – assistant engineer
- Bob Ludwig – mastering at Masterdisk (New York, NY)
- Bill Burks – art direction, design
- Bob Cass – photography
- Block-Kewley Management – management

== Charts ==
Album – Billboard
Year	Chart	Position
1978	Jazz Albums	2
1978	R&B Albums	32
1978	The Billboard 200	49
