= Whispers and Promises =

Studio album by Earl Klugh
- Released: April 25, 1989
- Studios: United Sound Systems and Lakeview Studio (Detroit, Michigan); Mediasound Studios and Sigma Sound Studios (New York City, New York); Ocean Way Recording (Hollywood, California); Ameraycan Studios (North Hollywood, California)
- Genres: Crossover jazz, instrumental pop
- Length: 42:50
- Label: Warner Bros.
- Producer: Earl Klugh

Earl Klugh chronology
Collaboration (1987)	Whispers and Promises (1989)	Solo Guitar (1989)

Professional ratings
Review scores
Source	Rating
allmusic.com	3/5 stars

Whispers and Promises is an instrumental-pop studio album by Earl Klugh released in 1989. The album received a Grammy nomination for Best Pop Instrumental Performance at the 32nd Grammy Awards in 1990. In this release, Klugh delivers his well-known "light and smooth guitar picking, backed by swarms of violins, chimes and gentle alto saxophones, beautifully arranged and wonderfully romantic". The album also features Grammy Award winner Don Sebesky as conductor and arranger.

== Track listing ==
All songs written by Earl Klugh.

1. "What Love Can Do" - 4:30
2. "Master of Suspense" - 4:56
3. "Water Song" - 2:28
4. "Strawberry Avenue" - 4:22
5. "Fall in Love" - 4:25
6. "Summer Nights" - 4:08
7. "Just You and Me" - 3:41
8. "Whispers and Promises" - 5:32
9. "Frisky Biscuits" - 3:34
10. "Tango Classico" - 5:14
- Track information and credits verified from the album's liner notes.

== Personnel ==
- Earl Klugh – guitars, keyboards (2, 6, 7, 9)
- Ronnie Foster – keyboards (1, 2, 5, 7, 8), synthesizer fills (6)
- Gary Schunk – acoustic piano (4)
- Thom Hall – keyboards (7, 9)
- Warren Bernhardt – acoustic piano (10)
- Dominic Cortese – accordion (10)
- Paul Jackson Jr. – electric guitar (1, 5, 8)
- Chuck Loeb – rhythm guitar (4)
- Perry Hughes – electric guitar (7, 9)
- Freddie Washington – bass (1)
- Alex Blake – bass (4)
- Jimmy Johnson – bass (5, 8)
- George Duke – synth bass (6)
- Calvin Bryant – bass (7, 9)
- Eddie Gómez – bass (10)
- Harvey Mason – drums (1, 2, 5, 8)
- Gene Dunlap – drum computer programming (2, 6), drums (7, 9)
- Buddy Williams – drums (4)
- Paulinho da Costa – percussion (1, 2, 5, 7)
- Larry Frantangelo – percussion (9)
- Ray Manzerolle – alto saxophone (7, 9)
- Michal Urbaniak – violin (10)
- David Nadien – concertmaster (4)

Horns on "Strawberry Avenue"

- Ronnie Cuber, Lawrence Feldman, Frank Wess and George Young – saxophones
- Birch Johnson, Keith O'Quinn, Bob Smith and Dave Taylor – trombone
- Jon Faddis, Earl Gardner, Lew Soloff and Anthony Tooley – trumpet

Music arrangements

- Earl Klugh – arrangements (1–3, 5–9)
- Ronnie Foster – arrangements (1)
- Clare Fischer – string arrangements and conductor (3)
- David Matthews – arrangements and conductor (4)
- Gene Dunlap – arrangements (5)
- Don Sebesky – arrangements and conductor (10)

== Production ==
- Earl Klugh – producer, assistant engineer
- Dave Palmer – recording, mixing
- Nick Delre – assistant engineer
- Victor Deyglio – assistant engineer
- Gene Dunlap – assistant engineer
- Jerry Hall – assistant engineer
- Steve Holroyd – assistant engineer
- Mike Iacopelli – assistant engineer
- Bob Ludwig – mastering at Masterdisk (New York, NY)
- Bruce Hervey – production coordinator, management for E.K.I.
- Ameen Howarni – photography
- Lisa Spindler – photography
- Denny Berels – custom printing
- Meredith Lee Bailey – art direction, design, illustration, photo tinting

== Charts ==
Album – Billboard
Year	Chart	Position
1989	Top Contemporary Jazz	5
1989	The Billboard 200	150
