= Magic in Your Eyes (album) =

Studio album by Earl Klugh
- Released: 1978
- Studio: The Sound Factory (Los Angeles, California); Music City Music Hall and C.A. Workshop (Nashville, Tennessee)
- Genre: Crossover jazz, jazz pop, instrumental pop
- Length: 33:00
- Label: Blue Note
- Producer: Booker T. Jones

Earl Klugh chronology
Finger Paintings (1977)	Magic in Your Eyes (1978)	Heart String (1979)

Professional ratings
Review scores
Source	Rating
allmusic.com	3/5 stars

Magic in Your Eyes is the fourth studio album by Earl Klugh released in 1978. Chet Atkins, whom Klugh considers to be one of his main influences, is featured on the song "Good Time Charlie's Got the Blues".

== Track listing ==
1. "Magic in Your Eyes" (Earl Klugh) – 4:55
2. "Alicia" (Klugh) – 4:31
3. "Julie" (Klugh) – 4:32
4. "Lode Star" (Greg Phillinganes) – 4:47
5. "Cast Your Fate to the Wind" (Vince Guaraldi) – 4:40
6. "Rose Hips" (Klugh) – 2:46
7. "Good Time Charlie's Got the Blues" (Danny O'Keefe) – 4:29
8. "Mayaguez" (Klugh) – 3:37
9. "Cry a Little While" (Klugh) – 3:23

== Personnel ==
=== Musicians ===
- Earl Klugh – acoustic guitar
- Greg Phillinganes – Fender Rhodes (1, 2, 4–6, 8), acoustic piano (8)
- Darryl Dybka – Fender Rhodes (3)
- Chet Atkins – acoustic guitar (7)
- Lloyd Green – steel guitar (3, 7, 9)
- Scott Edwards – bass (1, 2, 4–6, 8)
- Hubie Crawford – bass (3, 7, 9)
- Gene Dunlap – drums (1–8), percussion (1, 9)
- Paulinho da Costa – percussion (1, 8), castanets (5)
- Booker T. Jones – chimes (5)

Music arrangements

- Booker T. Jones – string arrangements (1, 3, 5, 7, 9)
- Greg Phillinganes – rhythm and synthesizer arrangements (2, 4)

=== Production ===
- Booker T. Jones – producer
- Jim Nipar – engineer (1–6, 8), remixing (7)
- Bill Vandervort – engineer (7, 9)
- Serge Reyes – assistant engineer (1–6, 8)
- Bill Burks – art direction
- Jeff Lancaster – design
- Norman Seeff – photography
- Block-Kewley Management – management, direction

== Charts ==
Album – Billboard
Year	Chart	Position
1978	Jazz Albums	4
1978	The Billboard 200	139
