= Collaboration (George Benson and Earl Klugh album) =

1987 studio album by George Benson & Earl Klugh

Studio album by George Benson & Earl Klugh
- Released: 1987
- Studios: Power Station (New York); Bill Schnee (Hollywood); Amigo (Hollywood); Sunset Sound (Hollywood); Capitol (Hollywood); United Sound Systems (Detroit); Lion Share (Los Angeles); RPM (New York); Ocean Way (Los Angeles); Broadway Productions (Englewood, New Jersey); Circle Seven (Palisades, California)
- Genres: Smooth jazz, crossover jazz
- Length: 49:32
- Label: Warner Bros.
- Producer: Tommy LiPuma

George Benson chronology
While the City Sleeps... (1986)	Collaboration (1987)	Twice the Love (1988)

Earl Klugh chronology
Life Stories (1986)	Collaboration (1987)	Whispers and Promises (1989)

Singles from Collaboration
- 1. "Since You're Gone" Released: 1987; 2. "Dreamin'" Released: 1987

Professional ratings
Review scores
Source	Rating
AllMusic	3/5 stars

Collaboration is a smooth jazz studio album by George Benson and Earl Klugh released in 1987. The album was certified gold in the United States in February 1988.

== Track listing ==
No.	Title	Writer(s)	Length
1.	"Mt. Airy Road"	Marcus Miller	7:51
2.	"Mimosa"	George Benson	6:50
3.	"Brazilian Stomp"	Earl Klugh	5:33
4.	"Dreamin'"	Marcus Miller	5:49
5.	"Since You're Gone"	Earl Klugh	5:46
6.	"Collaboration"	Harvey Mason, Randy Goodrum	6:16
7.	"Jamaica"	Randy Goodrum	5:40
8.	"Romeo & Juliet (Love theme from Romeo & Juliet)" (not on LP)	Nino Rota	5:47

== Personnel ==
Musicians

- George Benson – electric guitar
- Earl Klugh – classical guitar
- Greg Phillinganes – keyboards, synthesizers (2, 3, 5–7)
- Rhett Lawrence – keyboard programming (1, 4, 6, 7)
- Jason Miles – synthesizer programming (1, 4)
- Larry Williams – synthesizer programming (2, 3, 5–7)
- James Newton Howard – synthesizer programming (5), synth strings (5, 7), synthesizers (8)
- Paul Jackson Jr. – rhythm guitar
- Marcus Miller – bass guitar (1–7)
- Chuck Domanico – upright bass (8)
- Harvey Mason – drums (1–7)
- Jimmy Bralower – LinnDrum programming (7)
- Vinnie Colaiuta – drums (8)
- Paulinho da Costa – percussion

Music arrangements

- Marcus Miller – rhythm track arrangements (1, 4, 6), synthesizer arrangements (1, 4)
- Marty Paich – string arrangements (1)
- Greg Phillinganes – synthesizer arrangements (2, 3, 5–7)
- Larry Williams – horn arrangements (2)
- James Newton Howard – synthesizer arrangements (5, 7, 8)
- Randy Goodrum – rhythm track arrangements (7)

== Production ==
- Tommy LiPuma – producer
- Rosemary Diminno – production coordinator
- Laura LiPuma – art direction, design
- Stuart Watson – photography
- Ken Fritz and Dennis Turner – management for George Benson
- Bruce Hervey for E.K.I. – management for Earl Klugh

Technical credits

- Doug Sax – mastering at The Mastering Lab (Hollywood, California)
- Bill Schnee – recording, mixing
- Dan Garcia – recording assistant, mix down assistant
- Dave O'Donnell – recording assistant
- Bart Stevens – recording assistant, mix down assistant
- Carl Beatty – additional recording
- Eric Calvi – additional recording
- Randy Goodman – additional recording
- Ross Pallone – additional recording
- Dave Palmer – additional recording
- Al Schmitt – additional recording
- Steven Strassman – additional recording
- Mark Cretella – additional recording assistant
- Mike Crowiak – additional recording assistant
- Peter Doell – additional recording assistant
- Mike Iacopelli – additional recording assistant
- Michael Mason – additional recording assistant
- Ray Pyle – additional recording assistant
- Joe Schiff – additional recording assistant
- Stephen Shelton – additional recording assistant

== Charts ==
Chart (1987)	Peak position
Australia (Kent Music Report)	87
US Billboard 200	59
US Top Contemporary Jazz Albums	1
US R&B Albums	28
