= Just Between Friends (soundtrack) =

Just Between Friends: Original Motion Picture Soundtrack

Soundtrack album by Patrick Williams and Earl Klugh
- Released: 1986
- Genres: Smooth jazz, crossover jazz, film music, instrumental pop, guitar jazz
- Length: 40:20
- Label: Warner Bros.
- Producer: Patrick Williams

Earl Klugh chronology
| Soda Fountain Shuffle (1985) | Just Between Friends (1986) | Life Stories (1986) |

Professional ratings
Review scores
| Source | Rating |
|---|---|
| allmusic.com | 2.5/5 stars |

Just Between Friends: Original Motion Picture Soundtrack is the original soundtrack to the film Just Between Friends. Released in 1986, the film score was composed by Patrick Williams and performed by Earl Klugh.

== Track listing ==
1. "Heat" - 4:10
2. "Strolling" - 2:21
3. "Secrets" - 3:17
4. "Bad News" - 3:02
5. "Foreplay" - 2:18
6. "Galleria" - 2:46
7. "Just Between Friends" - 3:58
8. "Missing You" - 2:39
9. "Like at First Sight" - 3:00
10. "Life Goes On" - 3:14
11. "Going Home" - 2:11
12. "Tennis Anyone" - 3:21
13. "Reconciliation" - 3:15
14. "Just Between Friends (Just Earl)" - 0:48

== Personnel ==
- Composer & Producer: Patrick Williams
- Guitar: Earl Klugh
- Keyboards: Don Grusin
- Drums: Harvey Mason
- Bass: Neil Stubenhaus
- Percussion: Paulinho Da Costa
- Guitar: Carlos Rios
- Guitar: Timothy Ray
- Keyboards: Randy Kerber
- Piano: Ralph Greeson
- Synthesizer Programming: Jay Gruska
- Percussion: Steve Foreman
- Concert Master: Paul Shure
- Engineer, Mixing: Don Hahn
