= Living inside Your Love =

Living Inside Your Love

Studio album by Earl Klugh
- Released: 1976
- Recorded: 28 June–5 August 1976
- Studio: Columbia's 30th Street Studio and Electric Lady Studios (New York City, New York); Kendun Recorders (Burbank, California); Westlake Studios (Los Angeles, California)
- Genre: Jazz, crossover jazz, jazz pop, instrumental pop
- Length: 37:13
- Label: Blue Note, Liberty
- Producer: Dave Grusin; Larry Rosen

Earl Klugh chronology
Earl Klugh (1976)	Living Inside Your Love (1976)	Finger Paintings (1977)

Professional ratings
Review scores
Source	Rating
AllMusic	3/5 stars

Living Inside Your Love is the second studio album by Earl Klugh released in 1976, by Blue Note Records and Liberty Records. George Butler was the executive producer.

== Cover Versions ==
- American jazz guitarist George Benson also covered his version of "Living Inside Your Love" from his album Livin' Inside Your Love in 1979.

== Track listing ==
1. "Captain Caribe" (Dave Grusin) – 5:20
2. "I Heard It Through the Grapevine" (Barrett Strong, Norman Whitfield) – 7:28
3. "Felicia" (Earl Klugh) – 5:25
4. "Living Inside Your Love" (Klugh, Grusin) – 5:40
5. "Another Time, Another Place" (Grusin) – 6:41
6. "The April Fools" (Burt Bacharach, Hal David) – 3:43
7. "Kiko" (Klugh) – 2:46

== Personnel ==
Musicians

- Earl Klugh – acoustic guitar, 12-string guitar (1, 5)
- Dave Grusin – Fender Rhodes (1–5, 7), synthesizers (1, 3, 5), Minimoog (4), acoustic piano (5), bell tree (5), percussion (7)
- Jeff Mironov – electric guitar (1, 2)
- Will Lee – electric bass (1, 2)
- Francisco Centeno – electric bass (3, 4)
- Eddie Gomez – bass (5)
- Louis Johnson – electric bass (7)
- Steve Gadd – drums (1–5)
- Ralph MacDonald – percussion (1–4)
- Harvey Mason – percussion (7)
- Eddie Daniels – soprano saxophone (1), tenor saxophone (1, 3), flute (1, 3)
- Patti Austin – vocals (4)
- Vivian Cherry – vocals (4)
- Lani Groves – vocals (4)

String section

- Dave Grusin – arrangements and conductor
- Norman Carr – concertmaster
- Charles McCracken and Richard Locker – cello
- Margaret Ross – harp
- Julien Barber and Theodore Israel – viola
- Ann Barak, Ruth Buffington, Frederick Buldrini, Doris Carr, Norman Carr, Joseph Goodman, Jean Ingraham, Harold Kohon, Guy Lumia, Noel Pointer, Tony Posk and Gerald Tarack – violin

=== Production ===
- George Butler – executive producer
- Dave Grusin – producer, packaging concept
- Larry Rosen – producer, packaging concept
- Andy Baldomare – packaging concept, cover photography
- Hazel Rosen – packaging concept
- Miguel Nazario – packaging concept
- Gregory Heisler – inner sleeve photography
- Les Davis – liner notes

Technical credits

- Dominick Romeo – mastering at Frankford/Wayne Mastering Labs (New York, NY)
- Larry Rosen – mixing, recording (1–6)
- Phil Schier – recording (7)
- Michael Frondelli – mix assistant, recording assistant (1–6)
- Neal Teeman – mix assistant, recording assistant (1–6)
- Frank Laico – additional string recording
- Ted Bronson – additional string recording assistant

== Charts ==
Album – Billboard
Year	Chart	Position
1976	Jazz Albums	8
1976	R&B Albums	58
1976	The Billboard 200	188
