= Finger Paintings =

Studio album by Earl Klugh
- Released: 1977
- Recorded: February 1977
- Studio: Kendun Recorders (Burbank, California); Electric Lady Studios and Columbia 30th Street Studio (New York, New York)
- Genre: Jazz, crossover jazz, jazz pop
- Length: 36:14
- Label: Blue Note
- Producer: Dave Grusin; Larry Rosen

Earl Klugh chronology
Living inside Your Love (1976)	Finger Paintings (1977)	Magic in Your Eyes (1978)

Professional ratings
Review scores
Source	Rating
AllMusic	2/5 stars

Finger Paintings is the third studio album by Earl Klugh released in 1977.

== Track listing ==
1. "Dr. Macumba" (Earl Klugh) – 4:27
2. "Long Ago and Far Away" (James Taylor) – 5:37
3. "Cabo Frio" (Klugh) – 3:32
4. "Keep Your Eye on the Sparrow" (Dave Grusin, Morgan Ames) – 4:37
  Horns arranged by Tom Scott
5. "Catherine" (Klugh) – 4:11
6. "Dance with Me" (John Hall, Johanna Hall) – 3:26
7. "Jolanta" (Klugh) – 3:03
8. "Summer Song" (Klugh) – 4:07
9. "This Time" (Klugh) – 3:44

== Personnel ==
Musicians

- Earl Klugh – acoustic guitar
- Dave Grusin – Fender Rhodes, synthesizers, percussion (5, 6)
- Lee Ritenour – electric guitar (1–3, 5, 9), 12-string guitar (9)
- Anthony Jackson – electric bass (1–3, 5, 9)
- Louis Johnson – electric bass (4, 6, 7)
- Francisco Centeno – electric bass (8)
- Steve Gadd – drums (1, 4, 6–8)
- Harvey Mason – drums (2, 3, 5, 9)
- Ralph MacDonald – percussion (1, 2, 7, 9)
- Steve Forman – percussion (3, 4, 8)
- Alexandra Brown – backing vocals (4)
- Lisa Roberts – backing vocals (4)
- Stephanie Spruill – backing vocals (4)

Horns (track 4)

- Tom Scott – arrangements
- Chuck Findley, Dick Hyde, Jack Nimitz, Jerome Richardson, Tom Scott and Larry Williams – horns

String section

- Dave Grusin – arrangements and conductor
- Arnold Belnick, Pamela Goldsmith, Endre Granat, Allan Harshman, Karen Jones, Jacob Krachmalnick, Bernard Kundell, Edgar Lustgarten, David Montagu, Constance Pressman, Dana L. Rees, Sheldon Sanov, Marshall Sosson, Ann M. Stockton and Gerald Vinci – string players

=== Production ===
- George Butler – executive producer
- Dave Grusin – producer
- Larry Rosen – producer, recording, mixing
- Phil Schier – horn and string recording
- Michael Ebert – recording assistant, mix assistant
- Michael Shulman – recording assistant, mix assistant
- John Golden – mastering
- Alicia Johnson – production coordinator
- Bill Burke – album design
- Gregory Heisler – photography
- Block-Kewley Management – management

== Charts Positions ==
Album – Billboard
Year	Chart	Position
1977	Jazz Albums	6
1977	R&B Albums	31
1977	The Billboard 200	84
