= Late Night Guitar =

Studio album by Earl Klugh
- Released: 1980
- Recorded: 1979–1980
- Studio: Electric Lady Studios and CBS Studios (New York City, New York)
- Genre: Smooth jazz
- Length: 35:06
- Label: Blue Note
- Producer: Earl Klugh; Roland Wilson

Earl Klugh chronology
Dream Come True (1980)	Late Night Guitar (1980)	Crazy for You (1981)

Professional ratings
Review scores
Source	Rating
AllMusic	3/5 stars
Billboard Magazine	

Late Night Guitar is an album by jazz guitarist Earl Klugh that was released in 1980. The album received a Grammy nomination for Best Pop Instrumental Performance at the 24th Grammy Awards in 1982. In this release, Klugh is joined by strings and horns in an orchestra arranged and conducted by David Matthews.

== Track listing ==
No.	Title	Writer(s)	Length
1.	"Smoke Gets in Your Eyes"	Jerome Kern; Otto Harbach	1:56
2.	"Nice to Be Around (Nice to Have Around)"	Paul Williams; John Williams	2:58
3.	"Like a Lover"	Dorival Caymmi; Alan Bergman; Marilyn Bergman; Nelson Motta	2:40
4.	"Laura"	Johnny Mercer; David Raksin	1:42
5.	"Jamaica Farewell"	Irving Burgie	3:22
6.	"Tenderly"	Walter Gross; Jack Lawrence	1:50
7.	"Mona Lisa"	Ray Evans; Jay Livingston	2:53
8.	"Triste"	Antônio Carlos Jobim	2:03
9.	"Two for the Road"	Henry Mancini; Leslie Bricusse	4:20
10.	"Mirabella"	Earl Klugh	2:42
11.	"Lisbon Antigua"	Raul Portela; José Galhardo; Amadeu Do Vale	2:02
12.	"A Time for Love"	Johnny Mandel; Paul Francis Webster	2:47
13.	"I'll Never Say Goodbye"	Alan Bergman; Marilyn Bergman; David Shire	3:51
Total length:			35:06

== Personnel ==
- Earl Klugh – acoustic guitar
- Ken Ascher – electric piano (11)
- David Spinozza – rhythm guitar (11)
- Marcus Miller – electric bass (11)
- David Friedman – percussion (2, 3, 7, 9, 13), vibraphone (3, 7)
- Leonard "Doc" Gibbs – percussion (5)
- Michael Collazo – Latin percussion (11)
- José Madera – Latin percussion (11)
- Phil Bodner – woodwinds (2, 3, 7, 9, 13)
- Wally Kane – woodwinds (2, 3, 7, 9, 13)
- Ronnie Cuber – baritone saxophone (11)
- Dave Tofani – tenor saxophone (11)
- Sam Burtis – trombone (11)
- John Gatchell – trumpet (11)
- Joe Shepley – trumpet (11)
- Gloria Agostini – harp (12)

String section (Tracks 2, 3, 7, 9, 11 & 13)

- David Matthews – arrangements and conductor
- Gino Biando, Jay Elfenbein, Jack Kulowitch and Lewis Paer – acoustic bass
- Jonathan Abramowitz, Beverly Lauridsen, Jesse Levy and Charles McCracken – cello
- Gloria Agostini – harp
- Lamar Alsop, Theodore Israel, Richard Maximoff, Emanuel Vardi and Lenore Weinstock – viola
- Sanford Allen, Harry Cykman, Barry Finclair, Diana Halprin, Regis Iandiorio, Leo Kahn, Charles Libove, Guy Lumia, Marvin Morgenstern, David Nadien, John Pintavalle and Richard Sortomme – violin

== Production ==
- Earl Klugh – producer
- Roland Wilson – co-producer
- Dave Palmer – recording engineer
- Frank Caico – string recording
- Joel Cohn – assistant engineer
- Bob Ludwig – mastering at Masterdisk (New York City, New York)
- John Kosh – art direction, design
- Aaron Rapoport – photography

== Charts ==
Album – Billboard
Year	Chart	Position
1981	Top Contemporary Jazz	4
1981	Jazz Albums	40
1981	The Billboard 200	98
