= Grammy Award for Best Instrumental Performance =

Music award category

The Grammy Award for Best Instrumental Performance was awarded from 1964 to 1967. The award had several minor name changes:

- From 1964 to 1965, the award was known as Best Instrumental Performance - Non-Jazz
- In 1966, it was called the Best Instrumental Performance (Other Than Jazz)
- In 1967, it was just Best Instrumental Performance

Although in the pop category of Grammy Awards, the award did not specify popular music performances. Since 1969, a specific pop award has been presented: Best Pop Instrumental Performance. Years reflect the year in which the Grammy Awards were presented, for works released in the previous year.

== Recipients ==
Year	Winner(s)	Title	Nominees	Ref.
1965	Henry Mancini	"The Pink Panther Theme"	Hollyridge Strings conducted by Stu Phillips for The Beatles Song Book; Quincy Jones for "Golden Boy (String Version)"; Al Hirt for "Cotton Candy"; Peter Nero for "As Long As He Needs Me"	
1966	Herb Alpert & the Tijuana Brass	"A Taste of Honey"	Neal Hefti for Girl Talk; Henry Mancini for The Great Race; Horst Jankowski for Walk in the Black Forest; Chet Atkins for Yakety Axe	
1967	Herb Alpert & the Tijuana Brass	"What Now My Love"	Neal Hefti for Batman Theme; Roger Williams for Born Free; Chet Atkins for Chet Atkins Picks on the Beatles; Maurice Jarre for Dr. Zhivago	
1968	Chet Atkins	"Chet Atkins Picks the Best"	Herb Alpert & the Tijuana Brass for Casino Royale; Cannonball Adderley Quintet for Mercy, Mercy, Mercy; Lalo Schifrin for Mission: Impossible theme; Bob Crewe Generation for Music to Watch Girls By	

== See also ==
- Grammy Award for Best Classical Performance – Instrumental Soloist or Soloists (with or without orchestra)
- Grammy Award for Best Hard Rock/Metal Performance Vocal or Instrumental
- Grammy Award for Best Instrumental Soloist Performance (without orchestra)
- Grammy Award for Best Instrumental Soloist(s) Performance (with orchestra)
- Grammy Award for Best Improvised Jazz Solo
- Grammy Award for Best Pop Instrumental Performance with Vocal Coloring
- Grammy Award for Best Country Instrumental Performance
- Grammy Award for Best Pop Instrumental Performance
- Grammy Award for Best R&B Instrumental Performance
- Grammy Award for Best Rock Instrumental Performance
