= Soda Fountain Shuffle =

Studio album by Earl Klugh
- Released: 1985
- Studios: A&M Studios (Hollywood, California); Mediasound Studios (New York City, New York)
- Genres: Crossover jazz, jazz pop, instrumental pop
- Length: 42:01
- Label: Warner Bros.
- Producer: Earl Klugh

Earl Klugh chronology
Nightsongs (1984)	Soda Fountain Shuffle (1985)	Just Between Friends (1986)

Professional ratings
Review scores
Source	Rating
allmusic.com	2.5/5 stars

Soda Fountain Shuffle is the 12th studio album by Earl Klugh released in 1985. This is the first album which Klugh recorded for Warner Bros. Records. Unlike his other albums where Klugh is accompanied by full orchestras, in this release, Klugh is backed by a 6-man band. The album contains "10 original Klugh instrumentals balancing his subtle and soft playing against a full range of electronic accompaniment".

== Track listing ==
All songs written by Earl Klugh.

1. "Just Pretend" – 3:40
2. "Baby Cakes" – 3:34
3. "Soda Fountain Shuffle" – 3:18
4. "Moonlight Dancing" – 4:41
5. "Incognito" – 4:35
6. "One Night (Alone With You)" – 4:34
7. "Some Other Time" – 3:39
8. "Rainbow Man" – 5:22
9. "Close to Your Heart" – 5:04
10. "April Love" – 3:34

== Personnel ==
- Earl Klugh – keyboards, acoustic guitars
- Greg Phillinganes – keyboards, synthesizer programming
- Bo Tomlyn – synthesizer programming
- Paul Jackson Jr. – electric guitars
- Louis Johnson – bass
- Harvey Mason – drums, DMX programming
- Paulinho da Costa – percussion

=== Production ===
- Earl Klugh – producer
- Dave Palmer – recording, mixing
- Jim Cassell – recording assistant
- Clyde Kaplan – recording assistant
- Alex Haas – mix assistant
- Bob Ludwig – mastering at Masterdisk (New York, NY)
- Roland Wilson – production assistant
- Laura LiPuma – art direction, design
- Richard Litt – front cover photography
- Carol Friedman – back cover photography
- E.K.I – management

== Charts ==
Album – Billboard
Year	Chart	Position
1985	Top Jazz Albums	3
1985	R&B Albums	23
1985	The Billboard 200	110
