= Peculiar Situation =

Studio album by Earl Klugh
- Released: July 27, 1999
- Studio: Studio A (Dearborn Heights, Michigan); Right Track Recording (New York City, New York)
- Genre: Smooth jazz, crossover jazz, jazz pop, instrumental pop
- Length: 52:13
- Label: Windham Hill Records
- Producer: Earl Klugh; Gary Brown (Track 2)

Earl Klugh chronology
The Journey (1997)	Peculiar Situation (1999)	Naked Guitar (2005)

Professional ratings
Review scores
Source	Rating
AllMusic	4/5 stars
PopMatters	7/10 stars
New Straits Times	not rated

Peculiar Situation is a smooth jazz studio album by Earl Klugh released in 1999. This release features Klugh on both guitar and keyboard, and contains Klugh's first ever vocal track, as he "takes the role of a sideman to a vocalist for the first time in his recording career, breezing in behind Roberta Flack on 'Now and Again'".

== Background ==
Klugh's first and only album for Windham Hill Jazz (01934 11383 2), his 20th studio album overall, finds him for the most part mining familiar and friendly territory. The exceptions being the aforementioned vocal track with Roberta Flack and the Caribbean flavored "Desert Paradise", with The Ambassadors providing backing vocals. The usual reliable crew of backing musicians is present, Al Turner, Lenny Price and Greg Phillinganes. The track "Before You Go" was used in the television series "Melrose Place". After this release, Klugh took six years off from studio recording to concentrate on world tours, including an American Goodwill tour sponsored by U.S. State Department.

== Track listing ==
All songs composed by Earl Klugh except where noted.

1. "Peculiar Situation" – 4:22
2. "Now and Again" (Klugh, Gary Brown) – 4:35
3. "Private Affair" – 4:30
4. "Thin Ice" – 4:37
5. "I'm Falling" – 4:33
6. "Romantic Intent" – 5:20
7. "Desert Paradise" – 4:45
8. "Forever Girl" – 5:23
9. "Before You Go" – 4:51
10. "Southern Dog" – 4:34
11. "When I Look at You" – 4:43

== Personnel ==
=== Musicians and vocalists ===
- Earl Klugh – all other instruments
- Greg Phillinganes – electric piano (2)
- Rick Williams – electric rhythm guitar (2)
- Donnie Lyle – electric rhythm guitar (10)
- Al Turner – bass, drums, percussion (5)
- Tommie Walker – synthesizer bass (11)
- Lenny Price – saxophone (1, 3–11)
- Roberta Flack – lead vocals (2)
- Gary Brown – backing vocals (2)
- Cindy Mizell – backing vocals (2)
- The Ambassadors (Adegboyega Adeniji, James Agwu, Ayite Milomfa, Jean-Claude Nkou, Henry Nwangumc, Emmanuel Osuyah & Isaac Usaron) – backing vocals (7)

=== Production ===
- Patrick Clifford – A&R
- Earl Klugh – producer
- Gary Brown – co-producer (2)
- Andrea Franklin – A&R administrator
- Bruce Hervey – production manager, management
- Sonny Mediana – art direction
- Johnny Lee – design
- Carol Weinberg – photography

=== Technical credits ===
- Greg Calbi – mastering at Sterling Sound (New York, NY)
- Eric Morgeson – recording (1, 3–11)
- Ray Bardani – mixing (1, 2), recording (2)
- Howie Lindeman – recording (2)
- Gerard Smerek – mixing (3–11)
- Todd Fairall – recording assistant (1, 3–11), mix assistant (3–11)
- Andrew Felluss – recording assistant (2)
- Jason Stasium – mix assistant (1, 2), recording (2), recording assistant (2)

== Charts ==
Album – Billboard
Year	Chart	Position
1999	Top Contemporary Jazz Albums	16
