= Low Ride =

Studio album by Earl Klugh
- Released: 1983
- Recorded: January–March 1982
- Genre: Crossover jazz, instrumental pop
- Label: Capitol
- Producer: Earl Klugh

Earl Klugh chronology
Crazy for You (1981)	Low Ride (1983)	Wishful Thinking (1984)

Professional ratings
Review scores
Source	Rating
Allmusic	link
The Pittsburgh Press	link

Low Ride is the 9th studio album by Earl Klugh released in 1983. The album features Klugh's signature sound of blending "heavy, rhythm-and-blues-oriented background with the feathery sound of Klugh". Conductor and arranger David Matthews joins Klugh on the orchestrated song "Christina".

== Track listing ==
1. "Back in Central Park" (3:47)
2. "(If You Want To) Be My Love" (5:18)
3. "Low Ride" (5:36)
4. "Just Like Yesterday" (4:26)
5. "If You're Still in Love with Me" (2:37)
6. "I Never Thought I'd Leave You" (3:46)
7. "Christina" (4:09)
8. "Night Drive" (6:48)

== Album Overview ==
All the tracks on Low Ride were written by Earl Klugh and recorded in February and May 1982 at A&M Studios in Los Angeles and Mediasound in New York. The album was produced by Earl Klugh and Roland Wilson. Engineers included Tom Jung, Dave Palmer, Jim Cassell and Andy Hoffman. Dave Palmer assisted Earl Klugh and Roland Wilson with final mixing and track listing. Mastering was undertaken by Bob Ludwig at Masterdisk, New York.

The album was released by Capitol Records in the US and UK (although the UK pressing was promoted by EMI Records with Capitol retaining the label in the UK). In the UK, the album's catalogue number was: EST 12253.

Low Ride is an album packed with an impressive list of jazz musicians of the day. Earl Klugh himself plays acoustic guitar, keyboards and dabbles with rhythm arrangements. He is joined by:

- Greg Phillinganes - keyboards and synthesizers
- Paul Jackson, Jr. - Electric Guitar
- Louis Johnson - Bass Guitar
- Raymond Pounds - Drums
- Paulinho Da Costa - Percussion
- Charles Meeks - Bass Guitar
- Denzil Miller - Electric Piano
- Lucio Harper - Bass Guitar
- Ronnie Foster - Electric Piano
- James Bradley, Jr. - Drums

There were connections with other artists all over this album. Most of the album's personnel were extremely well known. Ronnie Foster and Greg Phillinganes had worked with George Benson (Foster appeared on Benson's award-winning Breezin' (1976) LP as well as Benson's In Flight (1977) and Living Inside Your Love (1979)). Greg Phillinganes also appears on Living Inside Your Love with Earl Klugh amongst others - Earl wrote the title track. Paulinho Da Costa was a popular musician that worked with many artists whilst carving out a very interesting solo career, notably releasing the critically acclaimed club classic Deja Vu. Earl Klugh had honed much of his craft from George Benson. Benson himself did not appear on the Low Ride project due to the fact that he was recording his own album which was released at the same time as Low Ride, entitled In Your Eyes.

Charles Meeks played bass on the album's lead track Back In Central Park and then appears only on Christina, and If You're Still In Love With Me (which also features James Bradley, Jr. on drums). Denzil Miller, known affectionately as "Broadway" Miller at the time, plays the solo electric piano on the title track. Lucio Harper appears for one track namely "Just Like Yesterday" which got a lot of airplay on radio in the US and UK though was never released as a single in the UK.

"Back in Central Park" is a departure from much of the other tracks in that it has an underlining "live" party feel to the recording. Featuring the chatter and vocals of Frank Floyd, Merle Miller and Dana Kral, the lead album track was released as a single in the US and UK just ahead of the album's release by Capitol. The single, available in both 7" and 12" formats in the UK scaled the top 10 of the UK Jazz Funk and Soul charts and performed well in the UK Jazz Fusion Forty Chart.

On the title track, the sessions were joined by vocalists Marti McCall, Carolyn Dennis and Myrna Matthews. Orchestral arrangements for If "You're Still In Love With Me" were in the hands of Johnny Mandel; with Clair Fischer taking care of Christina. Responsibility for all horn arrangements on the album rested with Dave Matthews.

Leading UK Jazz Funk DJ Robbie Vincent played the outstanding track Night Drive on his famous Radio London "Saturday Show" when the album was still only available as an import. This caused a big scurry of fans and DJs to the London record shops that same weekend where import copies quickly sold out. Within two weeks, the album was released officially in the UK by EMI and sold well. Night Drive has been released in an edited format for radio play since but is now restored to full version on all pressings.

For many years, the Low Ride album remained unreleased on CD, except for a limited release in West Germany in 1983 on the EMI Capitol label (CDP 7 46007 2). Only in 2006/07 did CD copies start to surface and in 2010, the album finally was remastered and pressed alongside the excellent LPs Crazy For You and Dream Come True (Released by BCD Records under licence from EMI, Cat No: BCDCD952).

The album's original cover shot was taken by Jerry Farber with the album's overall design concept led by Pete Parsons.

Low Ride is significant in many regards. It was a dramatic and inspiring collection of contemporary jazz compositions, featuring some of the finest musicians of the time. Earl Klugh himself appeared to really come to the fore with this album and achieved one of the highest points of his career. The album also took its place alongside other albums at the time which included Bob James' All Around The Town (which featured Earl Klugh), Joe Sample The Hunter, Lonnie Liston Smith Dreams of Tomorrow, McCoy Tyner Looking Out and Sadao Watanabe How's Everything.

Back In Central Park, Night Drive and Christina have all appeared on compilations released prior to the remastering of the Low Ride album.

No film exists of Earl Klugh on tour with the album, nor has any studio footage been released to date. However, in 2000, Earl Klugh appeared at Jazz Central and this concert was subsequently released on DVD. Unfortunately, no tracks from Low Ride were performed. It is not known whether there are unreleased recordings or a series of demos in the vaults of Capitol / EMI from this album, but fans believe they do exist and look forward to the record company producing a 30th anniversary edition of the album that could have an additional disk of demos and unreleased recordings.

== Charts ==
Album – Billboard
Year	Chart	Position
1983	Jazz Albums	2
1983	Top Jazz Albums	13
1983	R&B Albums	27
1983	The Billboard 200	38
