= Naked Guitar =

Studio album by Earl Klugh
- Released: 9 August 2005
- Studio: Studio 861 (Atlanta, Georgia)
- Genre: Jazz
- Length: 55:32
- Label: Koch Records
- Producer: Earl Klugh

Earl Klugh chronology
Peculiar Situation (1999)	Naked Guitar (2005)	The Spice of Life (2008)

Professional ratings
Review scores
Source	Rating
AllMusic	3.5/5 stars
Jazz Review	
PopMatters	7/10 stars

Naked Guitar is a solo-guitar studio album by Earl Klugh released in 2005. The album received a Grammy nomination for Best Pop Instrumental Album at the 48th Grammy Awards in 2006. After six years of studio absence, Klugh returned to the studio and released a fingerstyle jazz album similar to his 1989 release "Solo Guitar". Naked Guitar is the first album to be recorded by Klugh on the Koch Records label. It features solo interpretations of 13 standards and pop classics, as well as the song "Angelina", a tune from Klugh's self-titled 1976 solo debut album that he wrote in 1971.

== Track listing ==
1. "The Night Has Thousand Eyes" – 4:01
2. "Baubles, Bangles and Beads" – 4:56
3. "Serenata" – 3:01
4. "Alice in Wonderland" – 2:35
5. "In the Moonlight" – 5:27
6. "The Summer Knows" – 4:24
7. "Ding Dong the Witch Is Dead" – 2:30
8. "Who Can I Turn To (When Nobody Needs Me)" – 3:32
9. "On a Clear Day" – 4:11
10. "Be My Love" – 4:00
11. "I Want to Hold Your Hand" (Lennon–McCartney) – 5:01
12. "All the Things You Are" – 4:52
13. "Moon River" – 3:54
14. "Angelina" (Earl Klugh) – 3:08

== Personnel and production ==
- Earl Klugh – guitars, producer
- Bert Elliott – engineer, mixing
- Alex Lowe – mastering at Red Tuxedo Mastering (Atlanta, Georgia)
- Jay Fletcher – photography art, concept
- Machistic – art direction, design

== Charts ==
Album – Billboard
Year	Chart	Position
2005	Top Contemporary Jazz	8
