= ARP 16-Voice Electronic Piano =

- Manufacturer: ARP
- Dates: 1979–1981

Technical specifications

Input/output
- Keyboard: 73 keys

The ARP 16-Voice Electric Piano was a 73-key electronic piano produced by ARP Instruments, Inc. from 1979 to 1981, with specially designed weighted maple action keys, similar to a grand piano. There was also a headphone jack on the front panel and two inputs on the back for external inputs such as tape recorders etc.

== Sounds ==
- Acoustic piano
- Vibes
- Harpsichord
- Harp
- Electric piano

== Pedal assembly ==
The unit featured two brass pedals: right for sustain, left soft pedal or vibrato.
