= Manhattan wiring =

A typical Manhattan wiring scheme (logic circuit is omitted)

Manhattan wiring (also known as right-angle wiring) is a technique for laying out circuits in computer engineering. Inputs to a circuit (specifically, the interconnects from the inputs) are aligned into a grid, and the circuit "taps" (connects to) them perpendicularly. This may be done either virtually or physically. That is, it may be shown this way only in the documentation and the actual circuit may look nothing like that; or it may be laid out that way on the physical chip. Typically, separate lanes are used for the inverted inputs and are tapped separately.

The name Manhattan wiring relates to its Manhattan geometry. Reminiscent of how streets in Manhattan, New York tend to criss-cross in a very regular grid, it relates to appearance of such circuit diagrams.

Manhattan wiring is often used to represent a programmable logic array.

Alternatives include X-architecture wiring, or 45° wiring, and Y-architecture wiring (using wires running in the 0°, 120°, and 240° directions).

== See also ==
- Manhattan metric
