= Solo Guitar (Earl Klugh album) =

Studio album by Earl Klugh
- Released: September 20, 1989
- Studio: Lakeview Studio (Detroit, Michigan); Ameraycan Studios (North Hollywood, California)
- Genre: Crossover jazz, jazz pop
- Length: 38:50
- Label: Warner Bros.
- Producer: Earl Klugh

Earl Klugh chronology
Whispers and Promises (1989)	Solo Guitar (1989)	Midnight in San Juan (1991)

Professional ratings
Review scores
Source	Rating
AllMusic.com	4/5 stars

Solo Guitar is the 15th studio album by Earl Klugh released in 1989.

== Track listing ==
1. "It's Only a Paper Moon" - 2:15
2. "So Many Stars" (Sérgio Mendes, Alan and Marilyn Bergman) - 3:13
3. "I'm Confessin' (That I Love You)" - 2:23
4. "If I Only Had a Brain" - 2:13
5. "Emily" - 2:43
6. "Love Is Here to Stay" - 2:42
7. "Someday My Prince Will Come" - 2:03
8. "Any Old Time of the Day" (Burt Bacharach, Hal David) - 3:30
9. "Once Upon a Summertime" - 3:06
10. "Embraceable You" - 3:50
11. "I'm All Smiles" (Michael Leonard, Herbert Martin) - 2:41
12. "You Make Me Feel So Young" - 3:01
13. "Autumn Leaves" - 2:34
14. "The Way You Look Tonight" - 2:36

== Personnel ==
- Earl Klugh – guitar solos
- Paul McGill – guitars

=== Production ===
- Earl Klugh – producer
- Dave Palmer – recording, mixing
- Jerry Hall – mix assistant
- Bob Ludwig – mastering at Masterdisk (New York, NY)
- Bruce Hervey – production coordinator, management for E.K.I.
- Meredith Lea Bailey – painting, packaging design

== Charts ==
Album – Billboard
Year	Chart	Position
1989	Top Jazz Albums	4
