= Manhattan Building =

Manhattan Building may refer to:

- Manhattan Building (Chicago)
- Manhattan Building (St. Paul, Minnesota)
- Manhattan Building (Muskogee, Oklahoma)

== See also ==
- Manhattan Carnegie Library Building, Manhattan, Kansas
- Manhattan Company Building, known currently as 40 Wall Street, skyscraper in downtown New York City
- Manhattan Building, formerly listed on the National Register of Historic Places in Lucas County, Ohio
