= Earl Klugh (album) =

Studio album by Earl Klugh
- Released: 1976
- Recorded: January – February 1976
- Studio: Kendun Recorders (Burbank, California); Record Plant and Westlake Audio (Los Angeles, California)
- Genre: Jazz; smooth jazz
- Length: 39:08
- Label: Blue Note
- Producer: Dave Grusin; Larry Rosen

Earl Klugh chronology
Earl Klugh (1976)	Living Inside Your Love (1976)

Professional ratings
Review scores
Source	Rating
Allmusic	4/5 stars
Baltimore Afro-American	

Earl Klugh is the debut album by jazz guitarist Earl Klugh, released in 1976. Klugh is accompanied by Louis Johnson on bass and Lee Ritenour on guitar.

== Track listing ==
All tracks are written by Earl Klugh except where noted

No.	Title	Writer(s)	Length
1.	"Las Manos de Fuego (Hands of Fire)"	Dave Grusin	5:33
2.	"Could It Be I'm Falling in Love"	Melvin Steals, Mervin Steals	4:01
3.	"Angelina"		4:50
4.	"Slippin' in the Back Door"	Louis Johnson	4:16
5.	"Vonetta"		6:04
6.	"Laughter in the Rain"	Neil Sedaka, Phil Cody	4:32
7.	"Waltz for Debby"	Bill Evans	4:58
8.	"Wind and the Sea"		4:48
9.	"Cabo Frio"		3:37
10.	"The Shadow of Your Smile"		3:00
11.	"Angelina"		5:16

== Personnel ==
=== Musicians ===
- Earl Klugh – acoustic guitars, electric guitars
- Dave Grusin – acoustic piano, Fender Rhodes, synthesizers, percussion, arrangements and conductor
- Lee Ritenour – electric guitars
- Louis Johnson – bass (1, 4)
- Charles Meeks – bass (2, 3, 5–8)
- Harvey Mason – drums, percussion
- Laudir de Oliveira – additional percussion
- Jerome Richardson – baritone saxophone, flute
- Ray Pizzi – soprano saxophone
- Pete Christlieb – tenor saxophone, flute
- Garnett Brown – trombone
- Oscar Brashear – trumpet, flugelhorn
- Chuck Findley – trumpet, flugelhorn
- Thelma Beach, Myer Bello, Marie Fera, Pamela Goldsmith, Karen Jones, Bernard Kundell, Edgar Lustgarten, Alexander Murray, Ralph Schaeffer, Daniel Shindaryov, Joseph Stepansky, Marcia Van Dyke, Charles Veal Jr. and Kenneth Yerke – strings

=== Production ===
- George Butler – executive producer
- Dave Grusin – producer
- Larry Rosen – producer
- Phil Schier – recording, mixing
- John Calder – assistant engineer
- Steve Hodge – assistant engineer
- Doug Rider – assistant engineer
- Dean Rod – assistant engineer
- John Golden – mastering
- Leonard Spencer – album design
- Paul Ruscha – photography

== Charts ==
Album – Billboard
Year	Chart	Position
1976	The Billboard 200	124
1976	Jazz Albums	16
