= Manhattan (soundtrack) =

Soundtrack to Woody Allen's film

Soundtrack album by New York Philharmonic, Buffalo Philharmonic Orchestra
- Released: 1979
- Genre: Jazz

Manhattan is the original motion picture soundtrack to Woody Allen's 1979 film Manhattan with music by George Gershwin. It was performed by the New York Philharmonic under Zubin Mehta and the Buffalo Philharmonic Orchestra under Michael Tilson Thomas. It was nominated for Best Soundtrack in the 33rd British Academy Film Awards.

== Background ==
Typically, Woody Allen selects and integrates music into his films during the editing process. However, for 'Manhattan,' Allen knew in advance that he wanted to use Gershwin's music. He stated, 'Sometimes I know in advance. When I made Manhattan, for example, I knew I was going to use this Gershwin music. Fellow Brooklynite Gershwin's 1924 composition Rhapsody in Blue, the opening musical number of the film, does seem perfectly apt for the film. The idea for the song came to Gershwin on a train journey to Boston, which he describes as "a musical kaleidoscope of America, of our vast melting pot, our unduplicated national pep, our blues, our metropolitan madness." It is that Metropolitan Madness that makes it work so well in Woody Allen's Manhattan. Used in the extended opening homage, it is the perfect soundtrack to New York at all hours.

The inspiration behind the soundtrack came to Allen when he was listening to the CBS Masterworks LP of Gershwin overtures, titled Gershwin on Broadway, in arrangements by Don Rose, recorded in 1976 by Michael Tilson Thomas and the Buffalo Philharmonic Orchestra (BPO). This LP included six Gershwin overtures: Girl Crazy, Of Thee I Sing, Let 'Em Eat Cake, Oh, Kay!, Funny Face, and Strike Up the Band. In order to secure the legal rights, Allen's producers sent each BPO musician a check for an extra recording session that would never take place.

Gershwin is widely considered to be a quintessential American composer whose music is culturally defining for many Americans – especially New Yorkers. The soundtrack contains a mix of Gershwin's more famous compositions (Rhapsody in Blue, "Someone to Watch Over Me" and "Embraceable You") and several lesser-known pieces. There is also variety in the instrumentation, with some scored for the full orchestra and some for smaller ensembles ("Mine" and "Love Is Here to Stay").

== Track listing ==
The music of the film was performed by the New York Philharmonic, Buffalo Philharmonic Orchestra and pianist Gary Graffman. The arrangements were mostly done by Tom Pierson.

- New York Philharmonic
  - Rhapsody in Blue
  - "Mine" (from Let 'Em Eat Cake)
  - "Love Is Here to Stay" (from The Goldwyn Follies)
  - "Love is Sweeping the Country" (from Of Thee I Sing)
  - "Land of the Gay Caballero" (from Girl Crazy)
  - "Sweet and Low Down" (from Tip-Toes)
  - "I've Got a Crush on You" (from Strike Up The Band)
  - "Do-Do-Do" (from Oh, Kay!)
  - "'S Wonderful" (from Funny Face)
  - "Oh, Lady Be Good!" (from Lady, Be Good!)
  - "Strike Up the Band" (from Strike Up The Band)
  - "Embraceable You" (from Girl Crazy)
- Buffalo Philharmonic
  - "Someone to Watch Over Me" (from Oh, Kay!)
  - "He Loves and She Loves" (from Funny Face)
  - "But Not for Me" (from Girl Crazy)

A part of the first movement of Mozart's Symphony No. 40 is heard in a concert scene.

== Chart performance ==
Chart (1980)	Position
Australia (Kent Music Report)	83

== Developments ==
After the success of Manhattan, the original BPO-Gershwin LP, Gershwin on Broadway, was later issued on CD (Sony MK2240) which also features the New York Philharmonic.
