= Luico Hopper =

American musician

Luico Hopper is an American musician who plays the bass, and an equestrian.

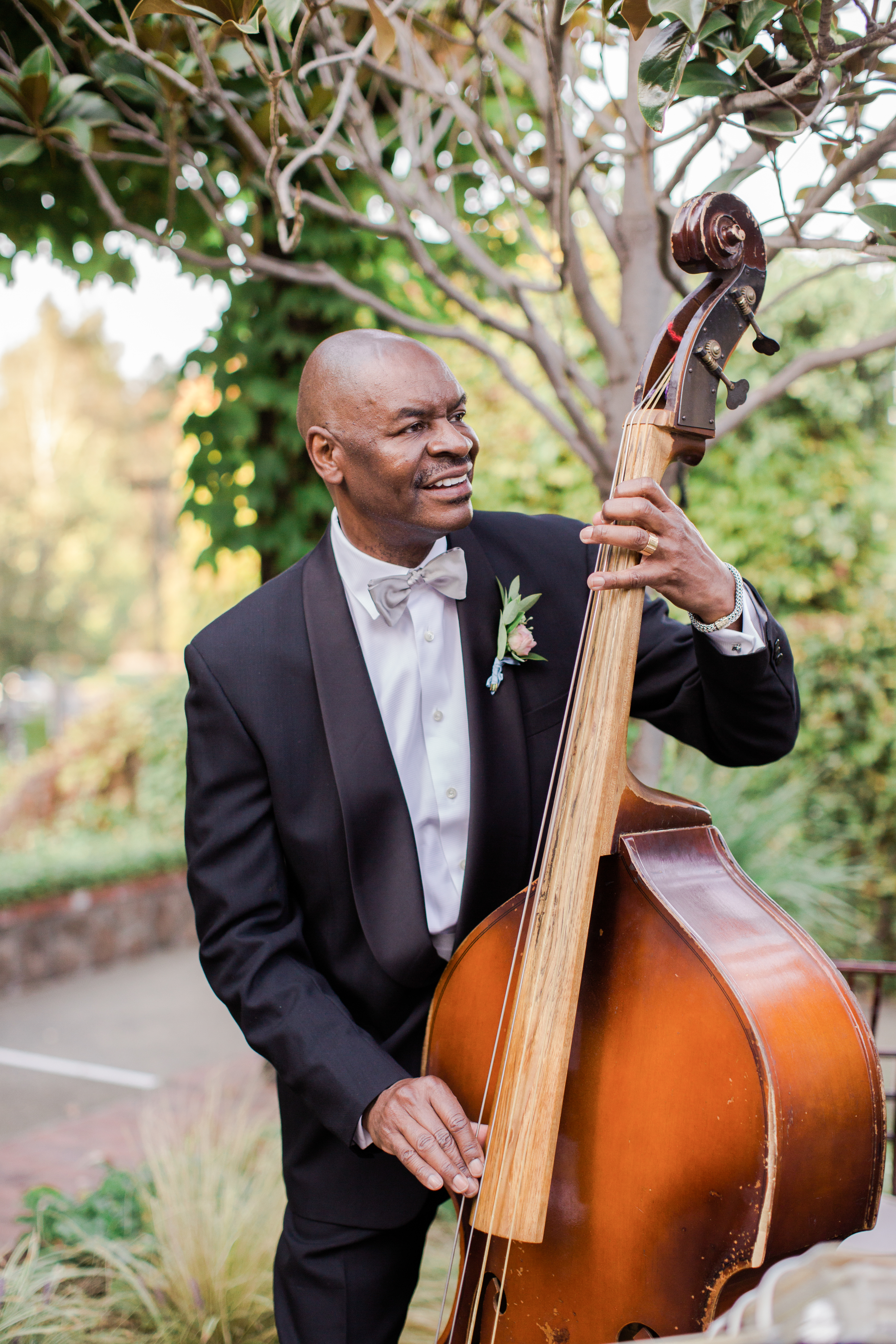
Luico Hopper, he plays bass

== Biography ==
Luico Hopper, American Bassist

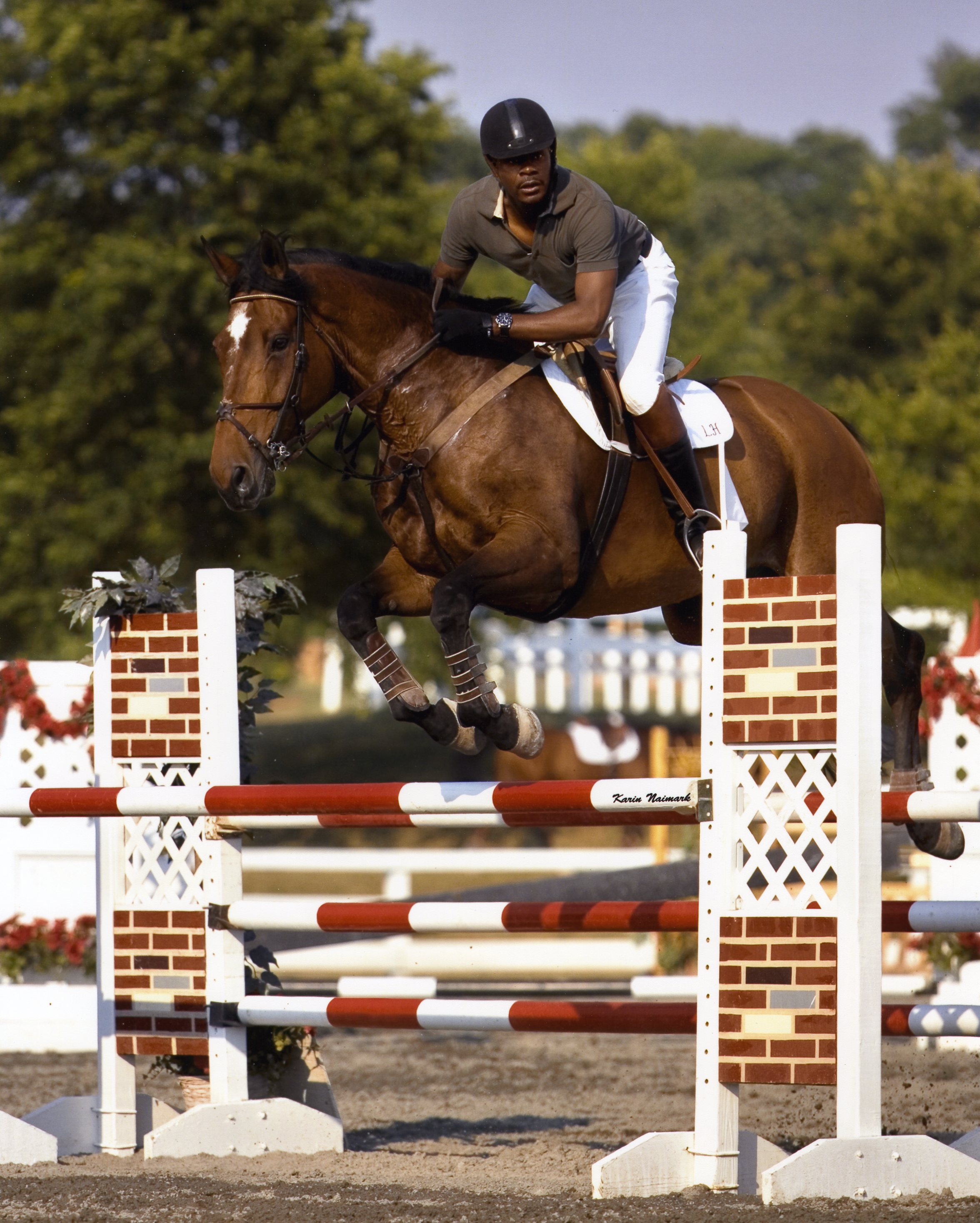
Hopper riding Pandour

Early Life

Luico Hopper (pronounced "Lou-é-co") was born on September 5, 1952, in Bassett, Virginia, to a musical family. Hopper was first introduced to music at an early age by his father who was an accomplished self-taught musician. Hopper played his first instrument the clarinet throughout high school. He developed interest in the guitar around the age of twelve and taught himself to play after being inspired by his father's musicianship. He started playing the electric and acoustic bass during his freshman year in college. Hopper joined the Norfolk State College Jazz Ensemble and remained part of this group until graduating in 1974 with a B.A. in Sociology.

Professional Career

In 1976 at the advice of drummer Dannie Richmond, Hopper moved to New York City to become a professional musician. In the late 70s, Hopper's career was established as a studio bassist recording on scores of radio and television commercials. During this time, Hopper also recorded and toured with a number of artists including Phyllis Hyman, Gato Barbieri, Roberta Flack, Gil Evans, Diana Ross, Earl Klugh, Jonathan Butler, Stephanie Mills, Johnny Gill, Gloria Lynne, Luther Vandross and Bryan Ferry.

Following nearly two decades of touring and performing around the world during the 70s and 80s Luico became increasingly sought after to perform on Broadway beginning with the hit musical "DreamGirls". In 1992, Hopper was the featured bassist in the Broadway hit, "Five Guys Named Moe". He later performed in other Broadway hits including "Bring In Da' Noise, Bring in Da' Funk" and "The Lion King", "Shrek the Musical", "Priscilla Queen of the Desert", "Motown the Musical" and "Shuffle Along".

During a period in the 90s, Luico held the bass chair in the band of "Saturday Night Live", and made television appearances on broadcasts such as "The Grammy Awards" and "The Essence Awards". On the March 16, 1995, episode of N.Y. Undercover, "It's a Man's Man's Man's World", Hopper was the featured bassist in a performance with James Brown, one of his childhood inspirations. In 1995, Hopper released his first solo album, "Lessons of Light" which featured his talent as a musician, composer and producer. His next solo album, "Reflections" was released in 2001. His latest album "Symbiotic Souls" was released on September 15, 2020.

Aside from playing the bass, Hopper is an avid equestrian. After decades of a successful professional music career, Hopper took a break to spend time fulfilling another childhood dream, riding and showing horses. Hopper shows and excels in the jumper arena traveling on the A circuit. Hopper is inspired by the symbiotic arts of music and riding.

== Selected discography ==
=== Solo ===
- "Reflections"
- "Lessons of Light"
- "Symbiotic Souls"

=== With other artists ===
- Euphoria" with Gato Barbieri
- Life is Art Various Artists
- The Payers Association, "We Got the Groove"
- Diana Ross, "Silk Electric"
- Diana Ross, "Diana's Duets"
- Gil Evans, "Lunar Eclipse"
- Earl Klugh "Low Ride"
- Earl Klugh "Nightsongs"
- Earl Klugh "Midnight In San Juan"
- Earl Klugh "Life Stories"
- Earl Klugh "Wishful Thinking"
- Earl Klugh, "Love Songs"
- Earl Klugh, "Best of Earl Klugh" vol.1
- Earl Klugh, "Best of Earl Klugh" vol. 2
- Earl Klugh, "Ultimate Earl Klugh"
- Earl Klugh Late Night Guitar/Two of a kind/Nightsongs
- Earl Klugh Fingers Paintings/Hearth String/Wishful Thinking
- Jonathan Butler, "Jonathan Butler"
- Bryan Ferry, "Live In Europe"
- Jay Hoggard, "Love Survives"
- Today, "New Formula"
- Johnny Gil, "Johnny Gil"
- Luther Vandross, "This Christmas"
- Stephanie Mills, "Home"
- Gloria Lynne, " No Detour Ahead"
- Joe Taylor, "Spellbound"
- Best of Smooth Jazz, Vol.1
- Best of Smooth Jazz, Vol. 2
- Marion Williams, "Born to Sing the Gospel"
- Marion Williams,"Surly God Is Able"
- Rev.Claude Jeter, "Yesterday & Today"
- Jackie Verdell, "Lay My Burden Down"
- Four Decades of Jazz, 1953–1993 40th Anniversary
- Andrea McArdle, Andrea McCardle On Broadway
- Sherry Winston, "Life is Love"
- Sherry Winston, "Love Is"
- Jeff Sigman, "Good For Me"
- Bryan Ferry Live 1988 World Tour DVD
- Five Guys Named Moe, Original Broadway Cast Recording
- Bring in 'da Noise Bring in 'da Funk, Original Broadway Cast Recording
- The Lion King, Original Broadway Cast Recording
- Cool Fever: From Disco Jazz to Jazz House Various Artists
- Beach Music Super Collaboration Album The Embers
- Rosko, "Private Moments"
- Eartha Kitt Live at the Cheltenham jazz festival DVD
- Shrek the Musical, Original Broadway Cast Recording
- Priscilla Queen of the Desert, Original Broadway Cast Recording
- Motown the Musical (Cast Recording)
- The Fortress of Solitude (Cast Recording)
