= Earl Klugh =

American acoustic guitarist and composer (born 1953)

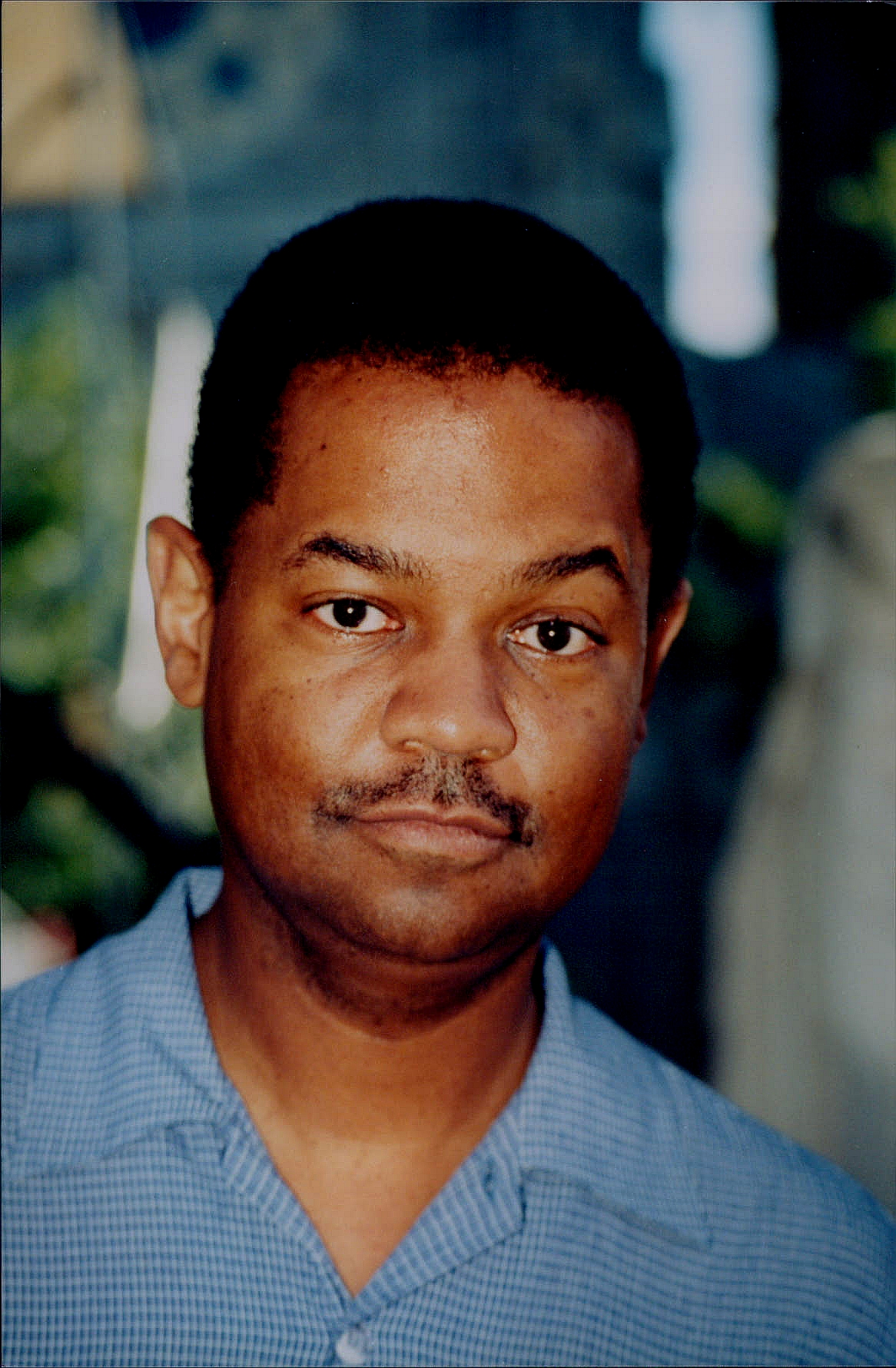
- Klugh in 1999

Background information
- Born: September 16, 1953 (age 72); Detroit, Michigan, U.S.
- Genres: Jazz fusion, smooth jazz, easy listening
- Occupation: Musician
- Instrument: Guitar
- Years active: 1970–present
- Labels: Blue Note, United Artists, Liberty, Capitol, Warner Bros., Koch
- Website: www.earlklugh.com

Earl Klugh (/kluː/ KLOO; born September 16, 1953) is an American acoustic guitarist and composer. Klugh has won one Grammy Award and received 13 nominations.

== Biography ==
At the age of six, Klugh commenced training on the piano until he switched to the guitar at the age of ten. At the age of 13, Klugh was captivated by Chet Atkins's guitar work on an episode of the Perry Como Show. Klugh was a performing guest on several of Atkins' albums. Atkins, reciprocating as well, later joined Klugh on his Magic In Your Eyes album. Klugh also appeared with Atkins on several television programs, including Hee Haw and a 1994 TV special titled "Read my Licks". Klugh was also influenced by Bob James, Ray Parker Jr, Wes Montgomery and Laurindo Almeida. His sound is a blend of these jazz, pop and rhythm and blues influences, forming a potpourri of sweet contemporary music original to only him.

Klugh's first recording, at age 15, was on Yusef Lateef's Suite 16. He played on George Benson's White Rabbit album and two years later, in 1973, joined his touring band.

For their album One on One, Klugh and Bob James received a Grammy for Best Pop Instrumental Performance of 1981. He has since received 12 Grammy nominations, millions of record and CD sales, and continues touring worldwide to this day. Klugh also was awarded the “1977 Best Recording Award For Performance and Sound” for his album Finger Paintings by Swing Journal, a Japanese jazz magazine.

Klugh has recorded over 30 albums including 23 Top Ten charting records—five of them No. 1—on Billboard's Jazz Album chart. With 2008's The Spice of Life, Klugh earned his 12th career Grammy nomination—his second nomination and release on the independent Koch label.

Each spring, Klugh hosts an event called Weekend of Jazz, featuring jazz musicians at the Broadmoor Hotel & Resort in Colorado Springs. Jazz greats including Ramsey Lewis, Patti Austin, Chuck Mangione, Bob James, Joe Sample, Chris Botti, Roberta Flack, and Arturo Sandoval have all performed at the annual event. In November 2010, Klugh brought the 'Weekend of Jazz' to Kiawah Island Golf Resort in South Carolina.

== Discography ==
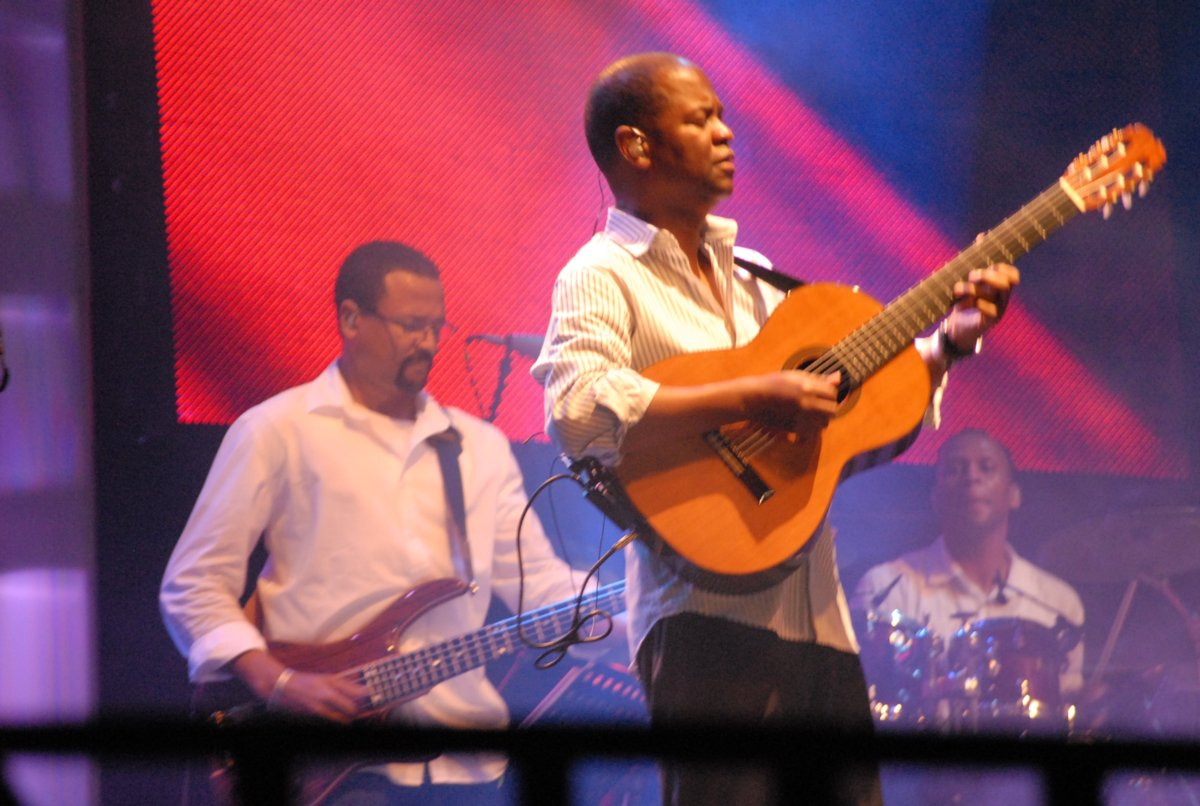
Klugh playing at the Festival de Jazz de la Riviera Maya in 2008

=== Studio albums ===
| Year | Title | Label | Notes |
|---|---|---|---|
| 1976 | Earl Klugh | EMI | |
| 1976 | Living inside Your Love | Blue Note | |
| 1977 | Finger Paintings | Blue Note | |
| 1978 | Magic in Your Eyes | Blue Note | |
| 1979 | Heart String | Blue Note | |
| 1980 | Dream Come True | EMI | Grammy nomination for Best Jazz Fusion Performance |
| 1980 | Late Night Guitar | Blue Note | |
| 1981 | Crazy for You | Blue Note | |
| 1983 | Low Ride | Capitol | |
| 1984 | Wishful Thinking | EMI | |
| 1985 | Nightsongs | Capitol | Grammy nomination for Best Pop Instrumental Performance |
| 1985 | Soda Fountain Shuffle | Warner Bros. | |
| 1986 | Life Stories | Warner Bros. | |
| 1989 | Solo Guitar | Warner Bros. | |
| 1989 | Whispers and Promises | Warner Bros. | Grammy nomination for Best Pop Instrumental Performance |
| 1991 | Midnight in San Juan | Warner Bros. | |
| 1994 | Move | Warner Bros. | |
| 1996 | Sudden Burst of Energy | Warner Bros. | |
| 1997 | The Journey | Warner Bros. | |
| 1999 | Peculiar Situation | BMG | |
| 2005 | Naked Guitar | Koch | Grammy nomination for Best Pop Instrumental Album |
| 2008 | The Spice of Life | Koch | Grammy nomination for Best Pop Instrumental Album |
| 2013 | HandPicked | Heads Up | |

=== Earl Klugh Trio albums ===
| Year | Title | Label | Notes |
|---|---|---|---|
| 1991 | The Earl Klugh Trio, Vol. 1 | Warner Bros. | with Gene Dunlap and Ralph Armstrong |
| 1993 | Sounds and Visions, Vol. 2 | | with Gene Dunlap, Ralph Armstrong & The Royal Philharmonic Orchestra |

=== Duet albums ===
| Year | Title | Label | Notes |
|---|---|---|---|
| 1979 | One on One | Tappan Zee | with Bob James - Grammy Award for Best Pop Instrumental Performance in 1981 |
| 1982 | Two of a Kind | Manhattan | with Bob James |
| 1983 | Hotel California/Super Guitar Duo | Verve | with Hiroki Miyano |
| 1987 | Collaboration | Warner Bros. | with George Benson |
| 1992 | Cool | Warner Bros. | with Bob James |

=== Omnibus live recording ===
- Bobby Hutcherson, Carmen McRae & Earl Klugh, Blue Note Meets the L.A. Philharmonic (Blue Note, 1978) – live at the Hollywood Bowl in 1977 with the Los Angeles Philharmonic

=== Soundtrack albums ===
| Year | Title | Label | Notes |
|---|---|---|---|
| 1980 | How to Beat the High Cost of Living | Columbia | Hubert Laws & Earl Klugh |
| 1983 | Marvin and Tige | Capitol | Patrick Williams & Earl Klugh |
| 1986 | Just Between Friends | Warner Bros. | Patrick Williams & Earl Klugh |

=== Video ===
| Year | Title | Label |
|---|---|---|
| 2001 | The Jazz Channel Presents Earl Klugh | Image Entertainment |
| 2003 | Earl Klugh In Concert | BMG/Image |
