= Gene Dunlap =

American drummer

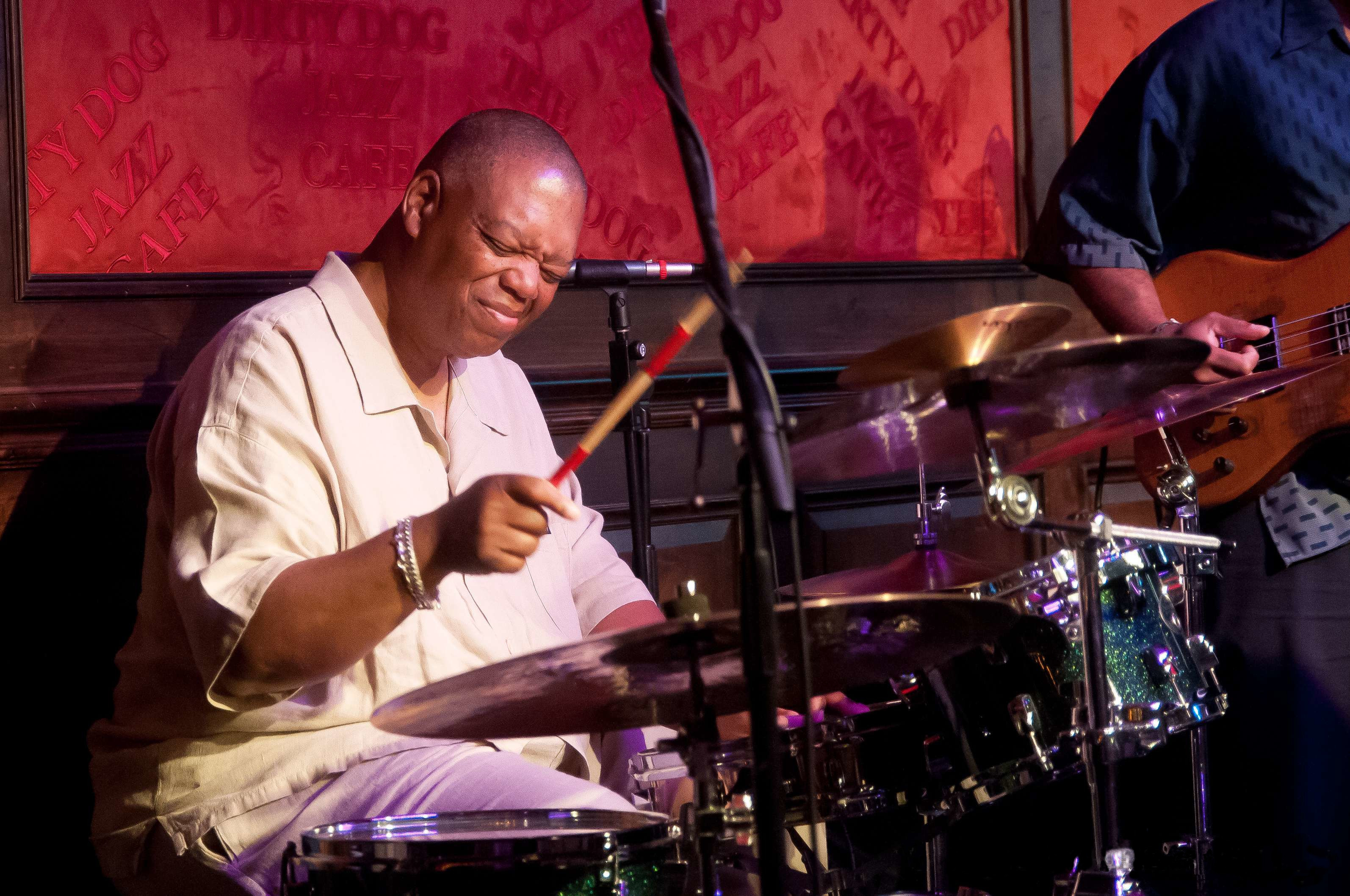

Background information
- Born: Detroit, Michigan, United States
- Genres: Soul, disco, R&B, jazz
- Occupations: Drummer, bandleader
- Label: Capitol

Gene Dunlap (born June 19, 1954 in Detroit, Michigan), is an American jazz/soul/disco drummer and bandleader.

== Life and work ==
Gene Dunlap was born and raised in Detroit, Michigan, and he began playing drums as a high school student. He joined the guitarist Earl Klugh as a drummer. In later years, he also performed with Roy Ayers, who played the vibraphone, and guitarist Grant Green.

Afterward, he rejoined Earl Klugh during the mid-1970s, to record a series of albums during a period of 20 years, including some albums for Capitol Records. After 1994, Dunlap quit performing and taught inner city youth in Detroit, but returned as a bandleader/drummer in April 2000.

== Discography ==
=== Studio albums ===
| Year | Album | Peak chart positions | | Label |
| Year | Album | US Jazz | US R&B | Label |
|---|---|---|---|---|
| 1981 | It's Just the Way I Feel | 29 | 39 | Capitol Records |
| 1981 | Party in Me | — | 68 | Capitol Records |
| 1983 | Tired of Being a Nice Guy | — | — | Capitol Records |
| 1994 | Groove with You | — | — | Avenue Records |
| 2000 | Tales of the Phatman | — | — | Avenue Records |
| 2003 | I Still Believe | — | — | Liquid 8 Records |
| 2003 | Waasup? | — | — | Liquid 8 Records |
| 2004 | Peaceful Days | — | — | 215 Records |
"—" denotes releases that did not chart.

=== Singles ===
| Year | Single | Peak chart positions | |
| Year | Single | US Dance | US R&B |
|---|---|---|---|
| 1981 | "Before You Break My Heart" (with The Ridgeways) | ― | 72 |
| 1981 | "It's Just the Way I Feel" | ― | — |
| 1981 | "Something Inside My Head" (feat. Phillippé Wynne) | ― | 61 |
| 1981 | "Rock Radio" | — | 94 |
| 1981 | "Take My Love" | 48 | ― |
| 1981 | "Party in Me" | ― | — |
| 1982 | "When You're Hot" | — | — |
"—" denotes releases that did not chart.
