= Soul Train Music Award for Best Jazz Album =

Annual US music award

This page lists the winners and nominees for the Soul Train Music Award for Best Jazz Album. The award was first given during the 1989 ceremony, after the categories honoring solo albums and group albums were combined. The category was retired after the 1999 ceremony.

== Winners and nominees ==
Winners are listed first and highlighted in bold.

=== 1980s ===
Year	Artist	Single	Ref
1989
1989	**Kenny G**	**Silhouette**	
1989	Bobby McFerrin	Simple Pleasures	
1989	Najee	Day by Day	
1989	Sade	Stronger Than Pride	

=== 1990s ===
Year	Artist	Single	Ref
1990
1990	**Quincy Jones**	**Back on the Block**	
1990	Alex Bugnon	Love Seasons	
1990	Kenny G	Kenny G Live	
1990	Joe Sample	Spellbound	
1991
1991	**Najee**	**Tokyo Blue**	
1991	Anita Baker	Compositions	
1991	Branford Marsalis Quartet and Terence Blanchard	Music from Mo Better Blues	
1991	Take 6	So Much to Say	
1992
1992	**Natalie Cole**	**Unforgettable... with Love**	
1992	Gerald Albright	Dream Come True	
1992	Alex Bugnon	107 in the Shade	
1992	Fourplay	Fourplay	
1993
1993	**Najee**	**Just an Illusion**	
1993	Gerald Albright	Live at Birdland West	
1993	George Duke	Snapshot	
1993	George Howard	Do I Ever Cross Your Mind	
1994
1994	**Kenny G**	**Breathless**	
1994	George Benson	Love Remembers	
1994	Terence Blanchard	The Malcolm X Jazz Suite	
1994	Fourplay	Between the Sheets	
1995
1995	**Norman Brown**	**After the Storm**	
1995	Gerald Albright	Smooth	
1995	Various Artists	A Tribute to Miles	
1995	Joshua Redman Quartet	Moodswing	
1996
1996	**Fourplay**	**Elixir**	
1996	Boney James	Seduction	
1996	Keiko Matsui	Sapphire	
1996	Pat Metheny Group	We Live Here	
1997
1997	**Herbie Hancock**	**The New Standard**	
1997	Quincy Jones	Q's Jook Joint	
1997	Diana Krall	All for You: A Dedication to the Nat King Cole Trio	
1997	Art Porter	Lay Your Hands on Me	
1998
1998	**Boney James**	**Sweet Thing**	
1998	Zachary Breaux	Uptown Groove	
1998	Dave Grusin	Dave Grusin Presents West Side Story	
1998	The Williams Brothers	Black Diamond	
1999
1999	**Herbie Hancock**	**Gershwin's World**	
1999	Olu Dara	In the World: From Natchez to New York	
1999	Russ Freeman and Craig Chaquico	From the Redwoods to the Rockies	
1999	John Scofield	A Go Go	

== See also ==
- Soul Train Music Award for Best Jazz Album – Group, Band or Duo
- Soul Train Music Award for Best Jazz Album – Solo
