= Esprit De Four =

Studio album by Fourplay
- Released: September 18, 2012
- Studio: Glenwood Place Studios (Burbank, California); KFP Studios (Bethlehem, Pennsylvania); Landmark Studios (Yokohama, Japan)
- Genre: Jazz
- Length: 54:56
- Label: Heads Up
- Producer: Fourplay (Tracks 1–9); Bob James and Atsuko Yashima (Track 10)

Fourplay chronology
Let's Touch the Sky (2010)	Esprit De Four (2012)	Silver (2015)

Professional ratings
Review scores
Source	Rating
Allmusic	4/5 stars

Esprit De Four is the 12th studio album by Fourplay, released in 2012.

== Track listing ==
1. "December Dream " (Chuck Loeb) – 7:46
2. "Firefly" (Nathan East, Tom Keane) – 4:12
3. "Venus" (Harvey Mason Sr.) – 7:11
4. "Sonnymoon" (Chuck Loeb) – 4:12
5. "Put Our Hearts Together [Instrumental Version]" (Bob James, Hillary James) – 6:08
6. "All I Wanna Do" (Nathan East, Tom Keane) – 4:16
7. "Logic of Love" (Chuck Loeb) – 7:05
8. "Esprit de Four" (Jerry Peters, Harvey Mason Sr.) – 6:22
9. "Sugoi" (Bob James) – 4:26
10. "Put Our Hearts Together [Vocal Track]" (Bob James, Hillary James) – 3:18

== Personnel ==
Fourplay

- Bob James – keyboards, arrangements (6)
- Chuck Loeb – synthesizers, guitars
- Nathan East – bass, vocals
- Harvey Mason – synthesizers, drums, percussion, vibraphone

with:

- Lizzy Loeb – additional vocals (1)
- Seiko Matsuda – lead vocals (10)

=== Production ===
- Mark Wexler – executive producer
- Fourplay – producers (1–9)
- Bob James – producer (10), cover design
- Atsuko Yashima – producer (10)
- Ken Freeman – engineer (1–9), mixing
- Takeshi Hara – engineer (10)
- Ryo Ogura – engineer (10)
- Nathaniel Alford – assistant engineer (1–9)
- Steve Vavagiakis – mastering at Bang Zoom Mastering (Rockland, New York)
- Harvey Mason – cover concept
- Sonny Abelardo – photography
- Steven Haberland – photography

== Chart performance ==
=== Album charts ===
Year	Chart	Position
2012	Billboard 200	167
2012	Billboard Jazz Albums	2
2013	Billboard Jazz Albums	2

=== Single charts ===
Year	Single	Chart	Position
2012	"All I Wanna Do"	Smooth Jazz Songs	5
2013	"Sonnymoon"	Smooth Jazz Songs	1
