= Let's Touch the Sky =

Studio album by Fourplay
- Released: October 25, 2010
- Studio: Castle Oaks Studio (Calabasas, California); Mason Sound (North Hollywood, California); G Studio Digital (Studio City, California); KFP Studios (East Stroudsburg, Pennsylvania)
- Genre: Jazz, jazz fusion
- Length: 62:32
- Label: Heads Up
- Producer: Fourplay

Fourplay chronology
Energy (2008)	Let's Touch the Sky (2010)	Esprit De Four (2012)

Professional ratings
Review scores
Source	Rating
Allmusic	3.5/5 stars

Let's Touch the Sky is the 11th studio album (12th overall) of the jazz group Fourplay, released in 2010. It is the first Fourplay album with Chuck Loeb, who replaced Larry Carlton on the guitar.

== Track listing ==
No.	Title	Writer(s)	Length
1.	"Let's Touch the Sky"	Bob James	5:22
2.	"3rd Degree"	Chuck Loeb	5:07
3.	"More Than a Dream"	Harvey Mason	5:03
4.	"Pineapple Getaway"	Mason	5:52
5.	"I'll Still Be Lovin' You" (featuring Nathan East)	Nathan East	5:18
6.	"Gentle Giant (for Hank)"	James	5:59
7.	"A Night in Rio"	East, Tom Keane	5:56
8.	"Love TKO" (featuring Ruben Studdard)	Cecil Womack, Linda Womack, Gip Noble	4:30
9.	"Above and Beyond"	Loeb	6:30
10.	"Golden Faders"	James	7:08
11.	"You're My Thrill" (featuring Anita Baker)	Jay Gorney, Sidney Clare	5:47
Total length:			62:32

== Personnel ==
Fourplay

- Bob James – keyboards
- Chuck Loeb – guitars
- Nathan East – bass guitar, vocals (5)
- Harvey Mason – drums, percussion

Additional Personnel

- Ruben Studdard – vocals (8)
- Anita Baker – vocals (11)
- Heather Mason – backing vocals

=== Production ===
- Mark Wexler – executive producer
- Fourplay – producers (1–7, 9–12)
- Harvey Mason, Jr. – producer (8)
- Ken Freeman – recording (1–7, 9–12), mixing (6, 10)
- Andrew Hey – recording (8)
- Don Murray – mixing (1–5, 7–9, 11, 12)
- Joshua Blanchard – assistant engineer
- Paul Blackmore – mastering at Concord Music Group (Beverly Hills, California)
- Debbie Johnson – production coordinator
- Amy McGuire Lynch – production coordinator
- Marion Orr – production coordinator
- Natalie Singer – product manager
- Bob James – cover design
- Sandrine Lee – photography
- Jennifer Armstrong – photography assistant
- Cassie O'Sullivan – stylist, makeup
- Sonny Abelardo – management

== Reception ==
- Soultracks: Highly recommended
