= Energy (Fourplay album) =

Studio album by Fourplay
- Released: September 23, 2008
- Recorded: 2008
- Studio: Castle Oaks Studios (Calabasas, California); 101 Studios (Tarzana, California); Sear Sound (New York City, New York); KFP Studios (East Stroudsburg, Pennsylvania)
- Genre: Jazz fusion
- Length: 50:12
- Label: Heads Up
- Producer: Fourplay; Marcel East

Fourplay chronology
X (2006)	Energy (2008)	Let's Touch the Sky (2010)

Professional ratings
Review scores
Source	Rating
Allmusic	3/5 stars

Energy is the 10th studio album by jazz group Fourplay, released on September 23, 2008. The cover shows the four members: keyboardist Bob James, guitarist Larry Carlton, bassist Nathan East, and drummer Harvey Mason.

Energy grafts a variety of sounds—R&B, pop, African—to Fourplay's jazz foundation. In addition to vocals by East, a member since the band's inception in 1990, the album includes vocals by Esperanza Spalding. The single "Fortune Teller" was nominated for a Grammy Award in the category Best Pop Instrumental Performance at the 51st Grammy Awards 2009. This was guitarist Larry Carlton's last Fourplay album before Chuck Loeb joined in 2010.

== Track listing ==
1. "Fortune Teller" (Jeff Babko, Nathan East, Bob James) - 5:53
2. "The Whistler" (Harvey Mason) - 5:28
3. "Ultralight" (Larry Carlton) - 4:17
4. "Cape Town" (Alan Dones, Marcel East, N. East) - 4:57
5. "The Yes Club" (B. James) - 5:07
6. "Prelude for Lovers"; feat. Esperanza Spalding (Kevin DiSimone, Hilary James) - 3:12
7. "Look Both Ways" (B. James) - 6:36
8. "Argentina" (Mason) - 5:24
9. "Comfort Zone" (Carlton) - 4:55
10. "Sebastian" (B. James) - 4:42
11. "Blues on the Moon" [Bonus Track] (Carlton, N. East, B. James, Mason) - 5:16

== Personnel ==
Fourplay

- Bob James – keyboards
- Larry Carlton – guitars
- Nathan East – 5-string bass, fretless bass, electric upright bass, vocals (4, 10)
- Harvey Mason – drums

Additional Personnel

- Marcel East – keyboards (4), programming (4), guitars (4), percussion (4)
- Elijah East – backing vocals (4)
- Noah East – backing vocals (4)
- Sara East – backing vocals (4)
- Esperanza Spalding – vocals (6)

=== Production ===
- Dave Love – executive producer
- Fourplay – producers, arrangements (4)
- Marcel East – producer (4), arrangements (4), additional engineer (4)
- Bob James – vocal session producer (6)
- Ken Freeman – additional production, recording, mixing
- Joshua Blanchard – recording assistant
- Chris Allen – vocal engineer
- Tom Gloady – assistant vocal engineer
- Steve Vavagiakis – mastering at Bang Zoom Mastering (Tappan, New York)
- Natalie Singer – product manager
- Debbie Johnson – album coordinator
- Amy McGuire Lynch – album coordinator
- Marion Orr – album coordinator
- Robert Hoffman – art direction, design
- Maura Lanahan – photography
- Sonny Abelardo – management
