= Nathan East =

American bass player and vocalist

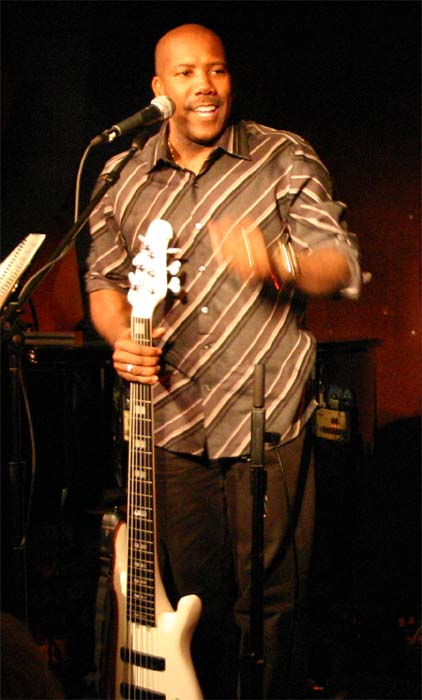
- East in 2005

Background information
- Born: Nathan Harrell East; 8 December 1955 (age 70); Philadelphia, Pennsylvania, U.S.
- Genres: Smooth jazz; jazz-funk; R&B; soul; rock
- Occupations: Musician; songwriter; record producer
- Instruments: Bass guitar; vocals
- Years active: 1971–present
- Member of: Fourplay
- Website: nathaneast.com

Nathan Harrell East (born December 8, 1955) is an American jazz, R&B, and rock bass guitarist and vocalist. With more than 2,000 recordings, East is one of the most recorded bass players in the history of music. East holds a Bachelor of Arts degree in music from the University of California, San Diego (1978). He is a founding member of contemporary jazz quartet Fourplay and has recorded, performed, and co-written songs with performers such as Bobby Womack, Eric Clapton, Michael Jackson, Joe Satriani, George Harrison, Ringo Starr, Phil Collins, Stevie Wonder, Toto, Kenny Loggins, Daft Punk, Chick Corea, and Herbie Hancock.

== Career ==
=== Early life ===
Nathan Harrell East was born on December 8, 1955, in Philadelphia, Pennsylvania to Thomas and Gwendolyn East. He is one of eight children (five boys and three girls) raised Catholic in San Diego, where the family moved when he was four; and still practices the faith. He is the younger brother of Rev. Monsignor Raymond "Ray" East who is the pastor of St Teresa of Avila Catholic Parish in Washington D.C.

East first studied cello from seventh through ninth grade and played in local Horace Mann junior high school's orchestra. At age fourteen he developed an interest in the bass guitar, playing in church with his brothers Raymond and David. He was active in his (Crawford) high school's music programs along with a local top 40 band called "Power". He has said his early influences included Charles Mingus, Ray Brown and Ron Carter on upright bass; and James Jamerson, Paul McCartney and Chuck Rainey on electric bass. He studied music at UC San Diego. Nathan East is also an accomplished amateur magician member of The Magic Castle and the Academy of Magical Arts.

=== Music career ===
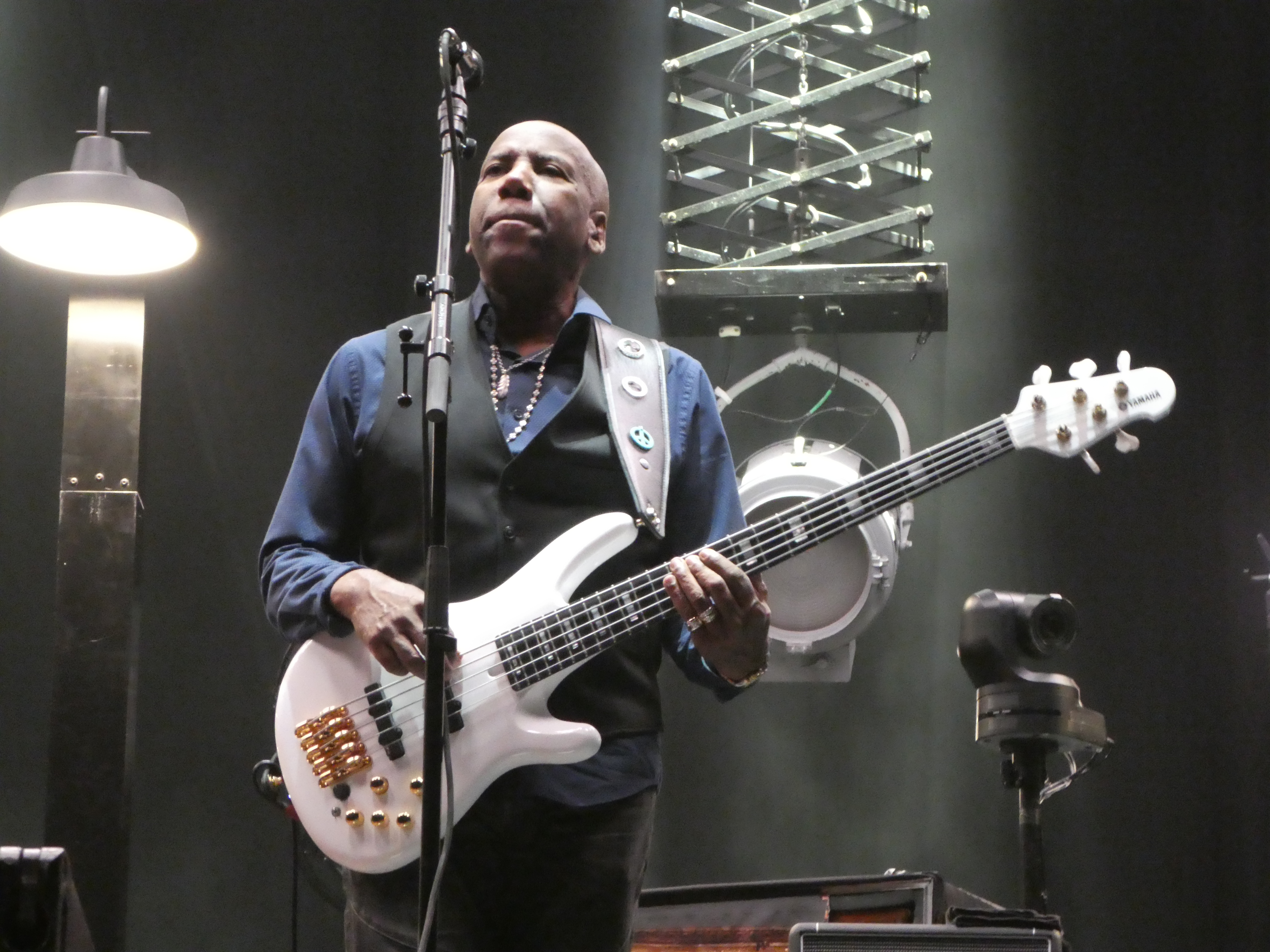
Nathan East as a member of Eric Clapton's band, Detroit, September 10, 2022

East is a founding member of the contemporary jazz band Fourplay with Bob James (keyboards), Lee Ritenour on guitar (later replaced by Larry Carlton and Chuck Loeb) and Harvey Mason (drums).

He has worked with Bobby Womack (on the album The Poet), Babyface, Anita Baker, The Bee Gees, Eric Clapton, Steve Winwood, Gail Ann Dorsey, Bryan Ferry, Daft Punk, Herbie Hancock, George Harrison, Michael Jackson, Diana Ross,Al Jarreau, Elton John, Quincy Jones, Earth, Wind & Fire, B. B. King, Kenny Loggins, The Love Unlimited Orchestra, The Manhattan Transfer, Ed O'Brien, Laura Pausini, Savage Garden, Sting, Barry White, and Stevie Wonder. He co-wrote the song "Easy Lover" for Phil Collins and Philip Bailey. In 2013, he recorded the bass line for the 2013 hit "Get Lucky" by Daft Punk, which won Grammy Awards for Record of the Year and Best Pop Duo/Group Performance (2014). Since the 1980s, East has been a member of Eric Clapton's studio and touring bands. East was invited to play at We Are One: The Obama Inaugural Celebration at the Lincoln Memorial in Washington, D.C., in 2009.

In early 2010, he was invited to join American Grammy Award-winning rock band Toto on their reunion tour to benefit member Mike Porcaro, who had been diagnosed with ALS. East later joined Toto for their 2011 and 2012 tours as well. He joined Eric Clapton's band for concerts in Japan, Singapore, Thailand, and Dubai in February and March 2014 and again for the Madison Square Garden and Royal Albert Hall concerts in May 2015.

East's self-titled debut solo album was released on March 25, 2014. During recording, he was joined by several of his longtime associates, including Stevie Wonder, Michael McDonald, Eric Clapton, Ray Parker Jr., and Greg Phillinganes.

In 2023, East performed with Eric Clapton during his Tokyo Residency at the Nippon Budokan from April 15–24. Returning from Japan, East joined Eric Clapton's nephew, Will Johns, and The Cream of Clapton Band at their April 30 show in San Diego. East's son, Noah East, has been a part of The Cream of Clapton Band since early 2023 and toured with the band throughout the spring of 2023.

In an April 2025 interview, East revealed that he had played on an album by English heavy metal band Judas Priest in the 1980s. While East did not specify the album, it is speculated to have been the 1986 album Turbo.

== Equipment ==
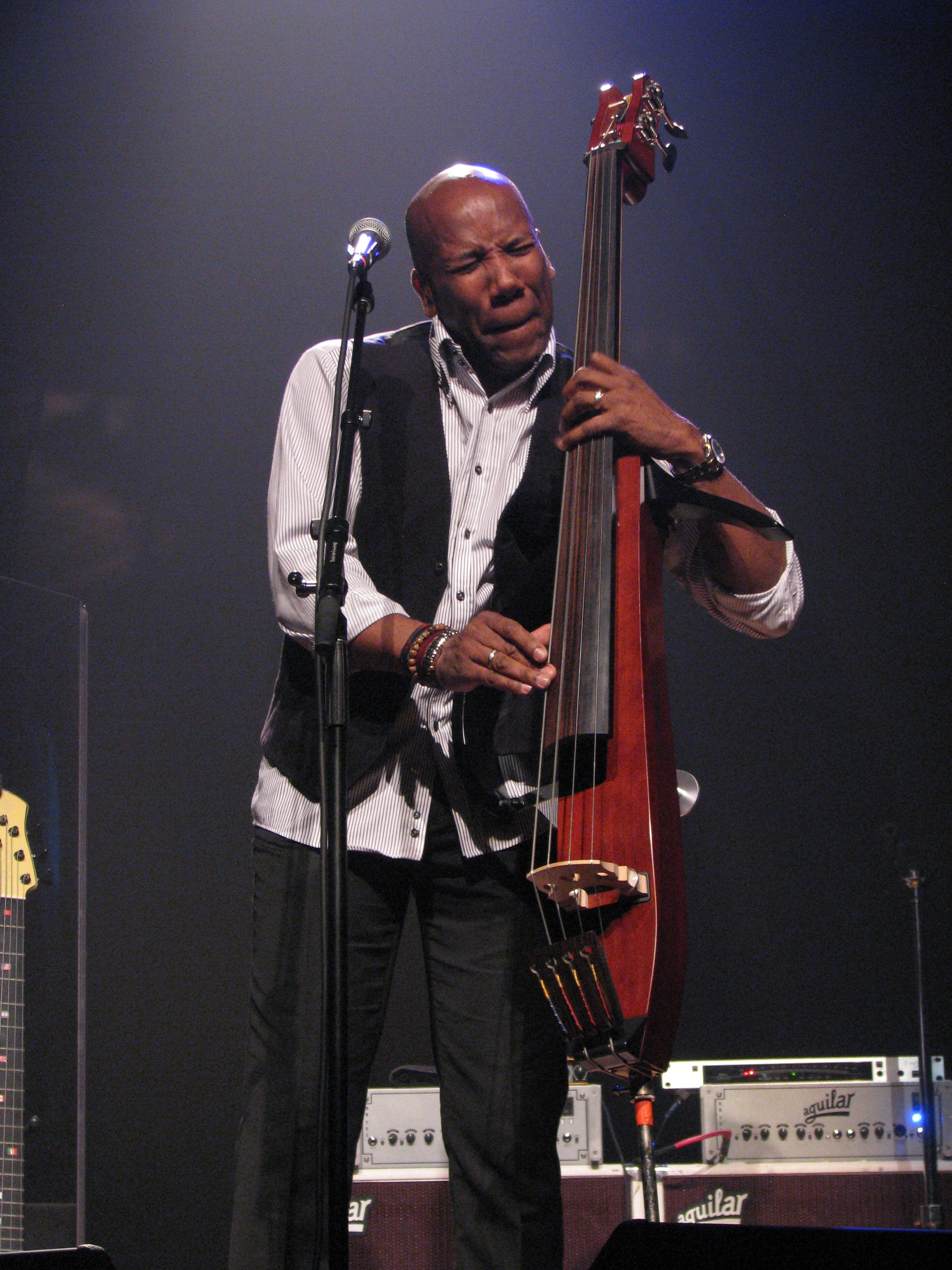
Nathan East plays a Yamaha SLB200 Silent Upright Bass with Fourplay at Knight Theater in Charlotte, North Carolina, on June 8, 2014.

With Yamaha, East developed a custom 5-string bass guitar signature model, the BBNE (modeled after his early 1980s BB5000 5-string bass). The second signature bass, the BBNE2, was released in 2001. A limited edition 30th Anniversary version (the BBNE2 LTD) was released in 2011. He has also used custom 6-string prototypes of his BBNE2 bass guitar between 2003 and 2005, along with his black 1980s LB-1 Motion 5-string bass and a pair of 6-string TRB6P models. Yamaha introduced the NE1 Parametric EQ Pedal, otherwise known as the "Magic Box" in the early 2000s. This pedal essentially gives the player the ability to use the "Nathan East EQ curve" on any bass they choose. East also plays a Yamaha SLB200 Silent Upright Bass.

In 2019, East co-developed a custom in-ear monitor dubbed N8 (a product abbreviation that plays on East's first name, Nate) with 64 Audio, an Oregon-based manufacturer of in-ear monitors for stage performers, mixing engineers and audio enthusiasts.

== Awards and honors ==
- Ivor Novello Award, British Academy of Songwriters, Composers and Authors for "Easy Lover"
- Most Valuable Player (bass), International Rock Awards
- Bassist of the Year, U.S. National Smooth Jazz Awards
- Most Valuable Player (bass), N.A.R.A.S.
- Most Performed Work, ASCAP
- Honored by U.S. Congress, 2007

== Discography ==
=== Albums ===
==== Fourplay ====
Year	Album	Label
1991	Fourplay	Warner Bros.
1993	Between the Sheets	Warner Bros.
1995	Elixir	Warner Bros.
1997	The Best of Fourplay	Warner Bros.
1998	4	Warner Bros.
1999	Snowbound	Warner Bros.
2000	Yes, Please!	Warner Bros.
2002	Heartfelt	Bluebird
2004	Journey	Bluebird
2006	X	Bluebird
2008	Energy	Heads Up
2010	Let's Touch the Sky	Heads Up
2012	Esprit de Four	Heads Up
2015	Silver	Heads Up

==== Solo ====
Year	Album	Peak chart positions						Label
Year	Album	US 200	US Top Sales	US Jazz	US Con. Jazz	US Top Cur	US Ind	Label
2014	Nathan East	193	193	2	1	163	41	Yamaha Entertainment Group
2015	The New Cool (Bob James with Nathan East)	—	—	5	2	—	—	Yamaha Entertainment Group
2017	Reverence	—	—	1	1	—	23	Yamaha Entertainment Group
"—" denotes a recording that did not chart.

=== Charted singles ===
Year	Title	Peak chart positions	Album
Year	Title	Smooth Jazz Airplay	Album
2014	"Daft Funk"	2	Nathan East
2014	"101 Eastbound"	11	Nathan East
2015	"Moondance" (Nathan East featuring Michael McDonald)	21	Nathan East
2016	"Lifecycle"	1	Reverence
2017	"Serpentine Fire" (Nathan East featuring Philip Bailey, Verdine White and Ralph Johnson)	17	Reverence
2023	"Nujazzy" (Bobby Lyle featuring Nathan East)	1	Bobby Lyle – Ivory Flow
2024	"Love of Your Life" (Lindsey Webster featuring Nathan East)	9	Lindsey Webster – Reasons
2024	"Longing for You" (Donald Hayes featuring Nathan East)	1	Donald Hayes – Soul Searching

== Live collaborations ==
Year	Artist	Show/Collaboration	Member/Guest
1971	Barry White		Band Member
1971	The Love Unlimited Orchestra		Band Member
1979	Patrice Rushen		Band Member
1980	Lee Ritenour		Band Member
1981	Hubert Laws		Band Member
1982	Joe Sample		Band Member
1984	Al Jarreau		Band Member
1985	Kenny Loggins	Live Aid	Band Member
1986	Eric Clapton		Band Member
1991	Fourplay		Band Member
1992	Eric Clapton	Unplugged	Band Member
1994-1997	Phil Collins		Band Member
2000	Babyface	Unplugged	Band Member
2006	Herbie Hancock		Band Member
2010-2014	Toto		Band Member
2014	Daft Punk, Stevie Wonder, Nile Rodgers, Pharrell Williams	Grammy Awards	Performer
2015	Eric Clapton		Band Member
