= Heartfelt (Fourplay album) =

Studio album by Fourplay
- Released: July 23, 2002
- Studio: Royaltone Studios (North Hollywood, California); O'Henry Sound Studios (Burbank, California).; Skip Saylor Recording (Los Angeles, California).
- Genre: Jazz
- Length: 66:10
- Label: Arista/Bluebird
- Producer: Fourplay; Harvey Mason, Jr.

Fourplay chronology
Yes, Please! (2000)	Heartfelt (2002)	Journey (2004)

Heartfelt is the seventh studio album by Fourplay, released in 2002. This is the first album to be released by Arista Records.

== Track listing ==
No.	Title	Writer(s)	Length
1.	"Galaxia"	Carlton, East, James, Mason	5:45
2.	"That's the Time"	Mason	6:44
3.	"Break It Out"	Carlton, East, James, Mason	5:43
4.	"Rollin'"	Carlton	4:11
5.	"Let's Make Love"	Babyface, East	3:56
6.	"Heartfelt"	James	6:59
7.	"Tally Ho!"	James, Mason	5:55
8.	"Café l'Amour"	Carlton, East, James, Mason	5:18
9.	"Ju-Ju"	Mason	5:27
10.	"Goin' Back Home"	Carlton, East	5:59
11.	"Karma"	Carlton, East, James, Mason	5:29
12.	"Making Up"	East	4:37
Total length:			66:10

== Personnel ==
Fourplay

- Bob James – keyboards
- Larry Carlton – guitars
- Nathan East – bass, vocals
- Harvey Mason – drums

Additional Personnel

- Ken Freeman – programming (1–8, 10–12)
- Christian "Tian" Salyer – programming (9)
- LeDon Bishop – additional backing vocals (5)

=== Production ===
- Fourplay – producers (1–4, 6–12)
- Harvey Mason, Jr. – producer (5)
- Don Murray – engineer (1–4, 6–12), mixing (1–4, 6–12)
- Dave Russell – engineer (5)
- Christian "Tian" Salyer – engineer (5), Pro Tools engineer (9)
- Ken Freeman – additional engineer (1–4, 6–12), Pro Tools engineer (1–8, 10–12)
- Andy Ackland – assistant engineer (1–4, 6–12)
- Derek Carlson – assistant engineer (1–4, 6–12)
- Chris Wonzer – assistant engineer (1–4, 6–12)
- Jon Gass – mixing (5)
- Robert Vosgien – mastering at Capitol Mastering (Hollywood, California)
- Sammy Sanchez – guitar technician
- Debbie Johnson – production coordinator
- Kwaku Alston – photography
- Nathan East – recording studio photography
- Jack Forchette – manager
- Air Tight Management – management company

== Reception ==
Professional ratings
Review scores
Source	Rating
Allmusic	3/5 stars

In his AllMusic review Robert Doerschuk said "Though all four players are true virtuosos, the band's mellow feel encourages each to avoid excess, or its positive alter ego, adventurism, in their solos, while the improvisational core of the project tends to weaken the compositional foundations."
