= Soul Train Music Award for Best Jazz Album – Solo =

Annual US music award

This page lists the winners and nominees for the Soul Train Music Award for Best Jazz Album – Solo. The award was only given out during the first two ceremonies, before being retired in 1989.

== Winners and nominees ==
Winners are listed first and highlighted in bold.

=== 1980s ===
Year	Artist	Album	Ref
1987	**George Howard**	**Love Will Follow**	
1987	Miles Davis	Tutu	
1987	Kenny G	Dual Tones	
1987	Sade	Promise	
1988	**Najee**	**Najee's Theme**	
1988	Jonathan Butler	Jonathan Butler	
1988	Dexter Gordon	The Other Side of Round Midnight	
1988	David Sanborn	A Change of Heart	

== See also ==
- Soul Train Music Award for Best Jazz Album
- Soul Train Music Award for Best Jazz Album – Group, Band or Duo
