= 4 (Fourplay album) =

Studio album by Fourplay
- Released: 1998
- Studio: Sunset Sound, NRG Recording Studios, Pacifique Recording Studios and Brandon's Way Recording (Hollywood, California) Remidi Studios (Ardsley-On-Hudson, New York)
- Genre: Jazz
- Length: 55:39
- Label: Warner Bros.
- Producer: Fourplay; Harvey Mason, Jr.

Fourplay chronology
The Best of Fourplay (1997)	4 (1998)	Snowbound (2000)

4 is the fourth studio album by Fourplay, released in 1998. This is their first album with guitarist Larry Carlton.

== Track listing ==
No.	Title	Writer(s)	Length
1.	"Still the One"	Mason	5:42
2.	"Little Foxes"	James	5:47
3.	"Sexual Healing"	Odell Brown, Marvin Gaye, David Ritz	5:28
4.	"Charmed, I'm Sure"	Carlton	6:12
5.	"Someone to Love"	East	5:42
6.	"Rio Rush"	Abraham Laboriel, Mason	7:47
7.	"Piece of My Heart"	James, Chris Walker	4:26
8.	"Slow Slide"	Mason	5:04
9.	"Vest Pocket"	James	4:42
10.	"Swamp Jazz"	Carlton	4:49
Total length:			55:39

== Personnel ==
Fourplay

- Bob James – Yamaha C7 MIDI grand piano, Korg Z1, Korg Trinity
- Larry Carlton – guitars
- Nathan East – bass guitar, bass scat (1), vocals (1, 2, 5, 6), backing vocals (3), voices (7), scat (7)
- Harvey Mason – drums

Additional Personnel

- Heather Mason – vocals (1, 2, 6)
- Kevyn Lettau – vocals (2, 6)
- Michele Pillar – vocals (2, 6)
- El DeBarge – lead vocals (3)
- James DeBarge – backing vocals (3)
- Babyface – vocals (5), vocal arrangements (5)
- Shanice Wilson – vocals (5)

== Production ==
- Bob James – executive producer
- Fourplay – producers
- Harvey Mason, Jr. – co-producer (3), additional recording
- Brad Gilderman – recording, mixing (1, 3)
- Don Murray – recording, mixing (2, 4–10), mastering
- Paul Boutin – additional recording
- Ken Freeman – additional recording
- Josh Henson – additional recording
- Steve Mixdorf – additional recording, assistant engineer
- Michael "Elvis" Baskette – assistant engineer
- Doug Bohem – assistant engineer
- S. Husky Hoskulds – assistant engineer
- Brian Virtue – assistant engineer
- Robert Vosgien – digital editing at CMS Digital (Pasadena, California)
- Dave McEowen – mastering assistant
- Capitol Mastering (Hollywood, California) – mastering location
- Debra Johnson – production coordinator
- Linda Cobb – art direction
- Zoren Gold – design, photography
- Happenstance – design, photography
- Darlington/Wheeler – management

== Reception ==
Professional ratings
Review scores
Source	Rating
Allmusic	3/5 stars
