= Journey (Fourplay album) =

Studio album by Fourplay
- Released: June 22, 2004
- Studio: Firehouse Recording Studios (Pasadena, California); Castle Oaks Studios (Calabasas, California); Pyramid Sound Recording Studios (Ithaca, New York)
- Genre: Jazz
- Length: 53:55
- Label: Arista
- Producer: Fourplay; Marcel East

Fourplay chronology
Heartfelt (2002)	Journey (2004)	X (2006)

Journey is the eighth studio album by Fourplay, released in 2004.

== Reception ==
Professional ratings
Review scores
Source	Rating
Allmusic	2.5/5 stars
Tom Hull	C

Tom Hull dismissed the album as a "dud" in his "Jazz Consumer Guide" for The Village Voice in September 2004. In a commentary published on his website, he explained, "The old white guys (pianist Bob James, guitarist Larry Coryell) here haven't stretched out in decades, but toss off better licks than your average smooth jazz setup; the not-so-old black guys in the so-called rhythm section have some explaining to do."

== Track listing ==
No.	Title	Writer(s)	Length
1.	"Fields of Gold"	Sting	5:40
2.	"Play Around It"	East	5:04
3.	"From Day One"	James	5:54
4.	"Journey"	East	3:27
5.	"Rozil"	Mason	5:29
6.	"Cool Train"	Carlton	5:31
7.	"Avalabop"	James	6:09
8.	"The Firehouse Chill"	East	5:36
9.	"Departure"	James	5:16
10.	"147 4th St."	Carlton	5:49

== Personnel ==
Fourplay

- Bob James – keyboards
- Larry Carlton – guitars
- Nathan East – bass, vocals (2, 4, uncredited on 1)
- Harvey Mason – drums, percussion, vibraphone, drum sequencing

Additional Personnel

- Ken Freeman – synthesizer programming
- Cody "Peyote" Cassiero – DJ (2)
- Bikki Johnson – shaker (4), backing vocals (4)

=== Production ===
- Fourplay – producers (1–3, 5–10)
- Marcel East – producer (4)
- Don Murray – recording, mixing (1–3, 5–10)
- Moogie Canazio – mixing (4)
- Ken Freeman – additional engineer, digital editing
- Ed Woolley – assistant engineer
- Robert Vosgien – mastering at Capitol Mastering (Hollywood, California
- Debbie Johnson – production coordinator
- Richard Thomas Jennings – art direction, design
- Bob James – cover artwork
- Jun Sato – photography
- Jack Forchette for Air Tight Management – management
