= Ed Byrne (musician) =

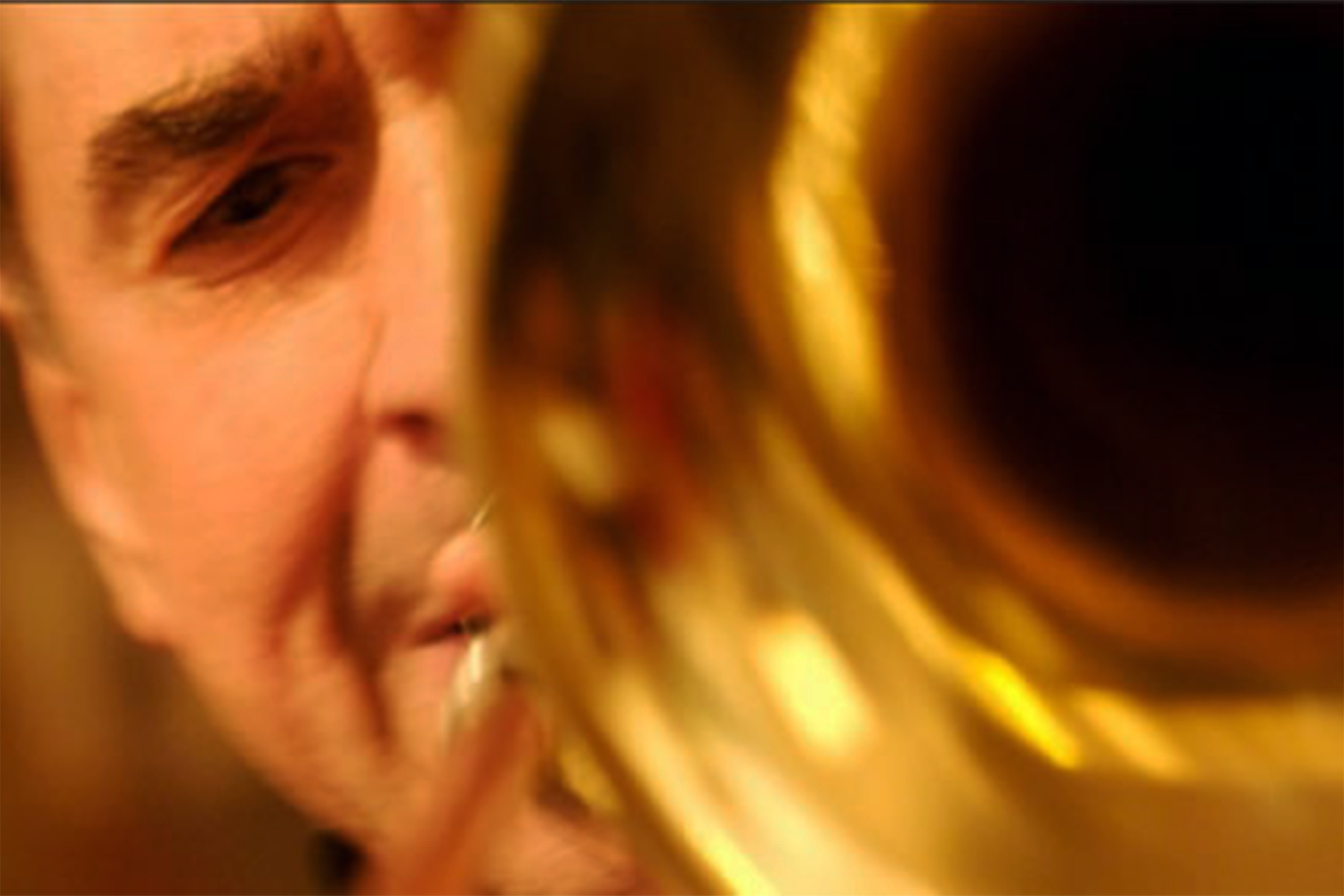

Background information
- Born: December 30, 1946 (age 79)
- Origin: Philadelphia, Pennsylvania
- Genres: Jazz, Latin jazz
- Occupation: Musician
- Instruments: Trombone (slide and valve)
- Years active: 1970-present
- Website: byrnejazz.com

Ed Byrne (born December 30, 1946) is an American trombonist, composer, arranger, author, and educator known for his jazz improvisations, original compositions, and the Linear Jazz Improvisation methodology books. His discography includes more than 70 recordings, including the "Carnegie Hall Concert (Gerry Mulligan and Chet Baker album)" and Eddie Palmieri’s Grammy Award-winning Latin jazz album Unfinished Masterpiece.

== Biography ==
Ed Byrne was born in Philadelphia, Pennsylvania, United States, in 1946.

Since the 1970s, Byrne played trombone as a sideman alongside many of the New York jazz scene's most well-known jazz artists (e.g., Chet Baker, Joe Henderson, Herbie Hancock, Charlie Mingus, Eddie Palmieri, Willie Colon, Manu Dibango, and many others). He appears as either sideman and/or featured soloist on more than 60 NYC-based studio recordings. Ed played lead trombone on Eddie Palmieri’s Grammy Award-winning Unfinished Masterpiece in 1974 and was nominated Best Trombone Soloist by Latin New York Magazine in 1976. His original composition, Fenway Funk, recorded by Bobby Paunetto in 1976 was nominated for a Grammy Award. Byrne has regularly led his own jazz groups for decades. Based in Massachusetts, his current quartet continues to feature his original music. Two Shades of Blue, his first album as leader (2000), isa NYC-studio recording featured guitarist John Abercrombie, pianist Jim McNeely, bassist Ron McClure, drummer Victor Lewis, Latin percussionist Milton Cardona, and Ed on trombone as well as a live quartet performance recorded live in at Skullers Jazz Club in Cambridge, Massachusetts. Conquistador, (2012), featured his Latin Jazz Evolution band.

Byrne was a full-time jazz professor at Berklee College of Music for many years and authored the 17-book Linear Jazz Improvisation series of jazz method books. He earned a Doctor of Musical Arts degree in Jazz Studies from the New England Conservatory of Music.

His former students include Kenny Werner, Abraham Laboriel, Makaya McCraven, and many others.

== Discography ==
=== As leader ===
- Two Shades of Blue (Ed Byrne Music: 2000; re-released Blue Truffle: 2014); arranger, composer, leader, producer, slide & valve trombones
- Conquistador – Latin Jazz Evolution (Blue Truffle: 2012); arranger, composer, leader, producer, trombone
- Salsa World Series Volume 5 Cuba Jam (Spotify, Amazon, Apple 2013); arranger, composer, leader, producer, trombone on Conquistador - One For Carlos
- Counterpoise – featuring Mikaya McCraven (Simmer: 2016, recorded 2003); arranger, composer, leader, producer, trombone

=== With Chet Baker ===
- Chet Baker: Career: 1952-1988 (Amazon: 2005): slide & valve trombone soloist

=== With Gerry Mulligan and Chet Baker ===
- Carnegie Hall Concert, Vol. 1 (CTI: 1974); slide & valve trombone soloist
- Carnegie Hall Concert, Vol. 11 (CTI: 1974); slide & valve trombone soloist

=== Various Artists ===
With Dave Brubeck, Erroll Garner, Thelonious Monk, Stan Getz, Miles Davis, Dave Grusin, Wynton Marsalis, André Previn, Paul Desmond, Thelonious Monk, Gil Evans, Stan Getz, Dave Brubeck, Paul Chambers, Dave Grusin, Steve Gadd, Roland Hanna, Bob Brookmeyer, Gary Burton, Paul Desmond, Jim Hall, Elvin Jones, Herbie Hancock, and others):

- The Best of Gerry Mulligan, Featuring Chet Baker (Amazon, Apple: 1991); slide & valve trombone soloist
- The Very Thought of You: Jazz for Lovers (Legacy/Columbia: 1995), Chet Baker & Gerry Mulligan – My Funny Valentine, w/ Ron Carter, Harvey Mason, John Scofield, Bob James, Dave Samuels, & Ed Byrne; trombone

=== With The Fania All Stars ===
- A Band And Their Music: Campeones (Fania: 1974, 2008); lead trombone
- El Raton: Carlos Santana, cheo Feliciano, Jorge Santana, Fania All Stars (Fania: 1974) Live HD Film; trombone
- Live at Yankee Stadium Vol 1 (Fania, 1975); trombone
- Live at Yankee Stadium Vol 2 (Fania, 1975); trombone
- Fania All Stars - Live (Fania: 1978); trombone
- Pone Duro: The Fania All Stars Story (Fania: 2010); lead trombone
- Live In Africa (Fania: 2011), trombone
- Salsa: Mis Mejores Exitos (Amazon, Apple: 2023); trombone

=== With Gene Krupa Big Band ===
- World of Music Tribute to Gene Krupa Felt Forum: January 17, 1974 Volume I (Jazz Legends: 1974); trombone
- World of Music Tribute to Gene Krupa Felt Forum: January 17, 1974 Volume II (Jazz Legends: 1974); trombone

=== With Maynard Ferguson ===
- Live at the Great American Music Hall, Volume I (Status: 1973, 1994/1995); slide & valve trombone soloist
- Live at the Great American Music Hall, Volume II (Status: 1973, 1994/1995); slide & valve trombone soloist
- Maynard Ferguson Gold Disk (CBS/Sony: 1974); slide & valve trombone soloist
- The Whole World's His Stage (Columbia: 1977); slide & valve trombone soloist
- The Best of Maynard Ferguson (Columbia: 1980); slide & valve trombone soloist
- I Love Contemporary Jazz (CBS Records: 1986); slide & valve trombone soloist

=== With Eddie Palmieri ===
- Unfinished Masterpiece (Coco: 1974); trombone (Grammy Award Winner: Best Latin Recording)
- Exploration-Salsa-Jazz-Descarga (Coco: 1978); trombone
- Oyelo Que Te Conviene - Eddie Palmieri & Lalo Rodriquez (Coco: 1975/1990); trombone

=== With Willie Colón And Mon Rivera ===
- There Goes The Neighborhood, Se Chavo El Vecindario (Vaya: 1975); trombone

=== With Willie Colón ===
- Salsa: Mis Mejores Exitos (UMG Recordins, Inc.: 2023); trombone

=== With Celia Cruz ===
- Centennial (Universal: 2025); trombone

=== With Mel Tormé ===
- Live at the Maisonette (Atlantic: 1975); lead trombone

=== With Andy Harlow ===
- El Campesino (Vaya: 1975); valve trombone soloist, slide trombone
- El Campesino (Amazon, Apple: 1995); valve trombone soloist, slide trombone

=== With Bobby Vince Paunetto ===
- Paunetto's Point (Pathfinder: 1976); slide & valve trombone soloist, composer/arranger Fenway Funk (Nominated, Grammy Award)
- Commit to Memory (Pathfinder: 1976); slide & valve trombone soloist, arranger
- Various Artists: Airto Moreira, Bobby Paunetto, et al. London Jazz Classics 2: Classic Soul Jazz Music from Around the World (Soul Jazz: 1994); Paunetto's Point (Pathfinder: 1976); featured slide & valve trombone soloist, composer/arranger
- Commit to Memory/Paunetto's Point (Pathfinder: 1998); slide & valve trombone soloist, composer/arranger

=== With Conjunto Libre ===
- Con Salsa, Con Ritmo, Volume I (Salsoul: 1976); trombone soloist, arranger
- Con Salsa, Con Ritmo, Volume II (Salsoul: 1976); trombone soloist, arranger
- Conjunto Libre - Tiene Calidad (Salsoul: 1978); trombone soloist, arranger
- Libre Greatest Hits (Salsoul: 1996); trombone soloist, arranger

=== With Seguida ===
- On Our Way To Tomorrow... (Fania: 1976); trombone

=== With Ethel Merman, Leslie Uggams ===
- Sesame Street Christmas (Sesame Street: 1978); trombone

=== With Manu Dibango ===
- Gone Clear (Mango: 1980); trombone
- Ambassador (Mango: 1981/1993); trombone
- Choc 'N Soul (Aux & Associes: 2010); trombone

=== With The Dalton Jazz Ensemble ===
- The Dalton Jazz Ensemble (RCA: 1981); producer, director, composer, arranger
- Seven Steps to Heaven (Trutone: 1985); producer, director, arranger, trombone, trumpet soloist

=== With Don Sebesky ===
- Full Cycle (Paddle Wheel: 1984); trombone soloist, euphonium

=== With Steve McCraven ===
- International World (ASP: 1991); composer, percussion, vocals, trombone soloist
- Song of the Forest Boogaraboo (World McC: 1994); featuring Archie Shepp; trombone soloist
- Bosco (World McC: 1996); featuring Archie Shepp, Arthur Blythe; trombone soloist
- Black Studies (Big Tree: 2003); trombone soloist, percussion, horn arrangements

=== With The Player's Association ===
- Turn the Music Up! (Vanguard: 1978); lead trombone
- Players Association-Turn The Music Up/Ride The Groove/The Get Down Mellow Sound (Vanguard: 1989); lead trombone
- The Player's Association (Southbound: 1998); lead trombone
- Various Artists: Tom Harrell, Mike Brecker, Jon Faddis, David Sanborn, Joe Farrell, Bob Berg; Earth, Wind and Fire and others - Cool Fever: From Disco Jazz to Jazz House (Irma: 1997); lead trombone
- Various Artists. Cool Fever: From Disco Jazz to Jazz House (Southbound: 1998); lead trombone

=== With Various Artists ===
- Nu Yorica! Culture Clash In New York City: Experiments In Latin Music 1970-77 (Soul: 1972 – 1977/1996); trombone
- Tropical con mis panas (Amazon, Apple: 1974/2021); trombone
- En Tu Salsa, Volume II (Universal, Amazon, Apple: 1974/2021); trombone
- ”Jazz Love” (BMG Italy, Sony Music:2010) trombone
- Wilkins: Jazz: The Great American Art Form (Amazon, Apple:2012);trombone
- The Cool Revolution (Masterworks Jazz:2010, Sony Music, Masterworks Jazz:2015);trombone
- Ponte Una Salsita Ahi (Universal:2024);trombone
- Fania 60th Anniversary Various Artists (Universal:2024); trombone

=== With Héctor Lavoe, Gloria Estefan, Cheo Feliciano, Mon Rivera, Rubén Blades, Willie Colón, and others ===
- Caminando con ritmo (Amazon, Apple: 2023); trombone

=== With Inés Desquinés ===
- Inés Desquinés Sings Steve Lacey (Senators: 2003); horn arrangements (arranger and producer of Riddle and Cliché), trombone soloist

== Published books ==
- Byrne has self-published his 17-book Linear Jazz Improvisation Method (for all instruments)
- Linear Jazz Improvisation The Method (Book 1) Copyright © Ed Byrne 2001
- LJI Triads (Book 2) Copyright © Ed Byrne 2001
- LJI 7th Chords (Book 3) Copyright © Ed Byrne 2001
- LJI Bichordal Triad Pitch Collection Etudes (Book 4) Copyright © 2008 Ed Byrne
- LJI Polytonal Triad Etudes (Book 5) Copyright © 2008 Dr. Ed Byrne
- LJI Functional Jazz Guitar Copyright © 2009 Dr. Ed Byrne
- LJI Hot Lines-Jazz Standards Copyright © 2009 Dr. Ed Byrne
- LJI Songbook Series (7 books-for all instruments) Copyright © Ed Byrne 2006
- LJI Block Chord Keyboard Cadences © Ed Byrne 2008
- Speaking of Jazz: Essays and Attitudes Copyright © Ed Byrne 2008
- The Influence of Claude Debussy and Maurice Ravel on Bix Beiderbeck, Bill Evans and Miles Davis (Edited Doctoral Dissertation) © Ed Byrne 1998
