= Yes, Please! =

Studio album by Fourplay
- Released: August 22, 2000
- Studio: Sear Sound (New York City, New York); Remidi Studio (Ardsley-On-Hudson, New York); Capitol Studios (Hollywood, California); Larrabee East and Pyramid Studios (Los Angeles, California)
- Genre: Jazz
- Length: 63:32
- Label: Warner Bros.
- Producer: Fourplay; Nathan East; Marcel East

Fourplay chronology
Snowbound (1999)	Yes, Please! (2000)	Heartfelt (2002)

Yes, Please! is the sixth studio album of the jazz group Fourplay which was released by Warner Bros. Records in 2000.

== Track listing ==
No.	Title	Writer(s)	Length
1.	"Free Range"	Harvey Mason, Sr.	6:27
2.	"Double Trouble"	Nathan East	5:51
3.	"Once Upon a Love"	Nathan East	4:34
4.	"Robo Bop"	Bob James	6:30
5.	"Blues Force"	Bob James, Larry Carlton, Nathan East, Harvey Mason, Sr.	7:01
6.	"Save Some Love for Me"	Nathan East	5:36
7.	"Fortress"	Bob James	8:12
8.	"Go With Your Heart"	Harvey Mason	4:08
9.	"Poco A Poco"	Harvey Mason	5:17
10.	"A Little Fourplay" (featuring Sherree)	Marcel East, Nathan East	4:23
11.	"Lucky"	Bob James	5:33

== Personnel ==
Fourplay

- Bob James – acoustic piano
- Larry Carlton – guitars
- Nathan East – bass guitar, vocals (6, 7), backing vocals (10)
- Harvey Mason – drums

Additional Musicians

- Ken Freeman – synthesizer programming
- Chanté Moore – vocals (6)
- Sherree – lead and backing vocals (10)

=== Production ===
- Fourplay – producers (1–9, 11)
- Nathan East – producer (10)
- Marcel East – producer (10)
- Don Murray – engineer, mixing (1–9, 11)
- Moogie Canazio – mixing (10)
- Steve Mixdorf – mix assistant (10)
- Ken Freeman – additional engineer, Pro Tools engineer
- Staffan Karlsson – additional engineer, Pro Tools engineer
- Christian Robles – additional engineer
- Dave Fisher – assistant engineer
- Jimmy Hoyson – assistant engineer
- Charlie Paakkari – assistant engineer
- Patrick Q.K. – assistant engineer
- Dylan Vaughan – assistant engineer
- Harvey Mason, Jr. – Pro Tools engineer
- Bill Smith – Pro Tools engineer
- Robert Vosgien – mastering at Capitol Mastering (Hollywood, California)
- Josh Henson – guitar technician
- Artie Smith – drum technician
- Debra Johnson – production coordinator
- Jack Forchette for Air Tight Management – management
- The Fitzgerald/Hartley Co.– management for Larry Carlton
