= Snowbound (Fourplay album) =

Studio album by Fourplay
- Released: October 19, 1999
- Studios: Sear Sound (New York City, New York); Remidi Studio (Ardsley-On-Hudson, New York); Schnee Studios (North Hollywood, California); Sunset Sound and Brandon's Way Recording (Hollywood, California); Pyramid Studios (Los Angeles, California); The Enterprise (Burbank, California); Castle Oaks Studios (Calabasas, California); Mountain Studios (Montreux, Switzerland)
- Genres: Jazz, Christmas
- Length: 55:03
- Label: Warner Bros.
- Producers: Fourplay; Matt Pierson; Nathan East; Marcel East

Fourplay chronology
4 (1998)	Snowbound (1999)	Yes, Please! (2000)

Snowbound is the fifth studio album by Fourplay, released in 1999. It is a recording of Christmas songs.

== Track listing ==
No.	Title	Writer(s)	Length
1.	"Angels We Have Heard on High"	Traditional	4:51
2.	"Hark! The Herald Angels Sing"	Felix Mendelssohn, Charles Wesley	4:48
3.	"Snowbound"	Walter Becker, Donald Fagen	5:02
4.	"The Christmas Song"	Mel Tormé, Robert Wells	5:57
5.	"The Ivy Variations"	James	3:36
6.	"River"	Joni Mitchell	5:48
7.	"Amazing Grace"	John Newton	4:44
8.	"Christmas Time Is Here"	Guaraldi, Mendelson	4:12
9.	"Santa Claus Is Comin' to Town"	John Frederick Coots, Haven Gillespie	3:44
10.	"Away in a Manger"	Traditional	3:30
11.	"Merry Little Stroll"	Ralph Blane, Hugh Martin	4:06
12.	"Auld Lang Syne"	Traditional	4:45
Total length:			55:03

== Personnel ==
Fourplay

- Bob James – acoustic pianos, keyboards, arrangements (1, 3–9, 11–12)
- Larry Carlton – guitars, arrangements (3, 7–9)
- Nathan East – 5-string bass, 6-string bass, fretless bass, arrangements (2–4, 7, 8), vocals (3, 6), finger snaps (4, 9)
- Harvey Mason – drums, arrangements (3, 4, 7, 8, 10), finger snaps (4, 9)

Additional Musicians

- Tim Heintz – synthesizer programming
- Marcel East – synthesizers (2, 4), additional percussion (2), drum and percussion programming (4), arrangements (4), vocal arrangements (4)
- Michael Thompson – additional guitars (3, 4)
- Matt Pierson – finger snaps (4, 9)
- Larry Williams – tenor saxophone (3, 9)
- Steve Holtman – trombone (3, 9)
- Gary Grant – trumpet (3, 9)
- Jerry Hey – trumpet (3, 9), horn arrangements (3, 9)
- Heather Mason – vocals (2)
- Gabriela Anders – vocals (3)
- Eric Benét – lead and backing vocals (4), vocal arrangements (4)
- Kevon Edmonds – backing vocals (4)
- Kevin Weaver-Bay – backing vocals (4)

== Production ==
- Fourplay – producers (1–3, 5–12)
- Matt Pierson – producer (1–3, 5–12)
- Marcel East – co-producer (2), producer (4), engineer
- Nathan East – producer (4)
- Moogie Canazio – engineer
- Ken Freeman – engineer
- Dan Garcia – engineer
- Brad Gilderman – engineer
- Jun Murkagawa – engineer
- Don Murray – engineer
- Dave Rideau – engineer
- Bill Schnee – engineer, mixing (1–3, 5–12)
- Jon Gass – mixing (4)
- Kyle Bess – assistant mix engineer (4)
- Koji Egawa – assistant engineer, assistant mix engineer (1–3, 5–12)
- Dave Fisher – assistant engineer
- Kris Fredricksson – assistant engineer
- Sejoon Kahng – assistant engineer
- Larry Malchose – assistant engineer
- Larry Buksbaum – computer operator
- Dave Khun – technical assistance
- Greg Calbi – mastering at Sterling Sound (New York, NY)
- Josh Henson – guitar technician
- Artie Smith – drum technician
- Debbie Johnson – production coordinator
- Dana Watson – production coordinator
- Mark Larson – design
- Lionel Flusin – band photography
- Les Morsillo – cover photography
- Darlington/Wheeler – management

== Reception ==
Professional ratings
Review scores
Source	Rating
Allmusic	3/5 stars
