= The Best of Fourplay =

Compilation album by Fourplay
- Released: June 24, 1997
- Genre: Jazz
- Length: 62:48
- Label: Warner Bros.
- Producer: Fourplay

Fourplay chronology
Elixir (1994)	The Best of Fourplay (1997)	4 (1998)

The Best of Fourplay is a compilation album by American smooth jazz quartet Fourplay, released in 1997. The 2020 SACD remastered edition of the album includes the bonus track, "The Closer I Get to You", a duet between Patti Austin and Peabo Bryson.

== Track listing ==
No.	Title	Writer(s)	Length
1.	"Max-O-Man"	Michael Lang, Harvey Mason	5:33
2.	"101 Eastbound"	Nathan East	5:56
3.	"Higher Ground" (New recording)	Stevie Wonder	4:56
4.	"4 Play and Pleasure" (New recording)	Lee Ritenour	5:30
5.	"Chant"	Bob James	6:24
6.	"After the Dance"	Marvin Gaye, Arthur Ross, Leon Ware	4:11
7.	"Bali Run"	James, Ritenour	5:32
8.	"Play Lady Play"	James, Ritenour	4:37
9.	"Between the Sheets"	Ernie Isley, Marvin Isley, O'Kelly Isley, Ronald Isley, Rudolph Isley, Chris Jasper	3:55
10.	"Amoroso"	Mason	5:49
11.	"Any Time of Day" (New recording)	East, Sam Purkin	6:16
12.	"Why Can't It Wait 'Til Morning" (Remixed version)	Phil Collins	4:01
Total length:			62:48

Professional ratings
Review scores
Source	Rating
AllMusic	4/5 stars

== Personnel ==
As listed in the liner notes.

Fourplay

- Bob James – keyboards
- Lee Ritenour – guitars
- Nathan East – basses, lead vocals (9)
- Harvey Mason – drums, percussion

Additional personnel

- Harvey Mason Jr. – synthesizer programming (3)
- Take 6 – vocals (3)
- David Thomas – lead vocals (3)
- El DeBarge – lead vocals (6)
- Chaka Khan – lead vocals (9)
- Dan Shea – additional keyboards (12)
- Phil Collins – lead vocals (12)

=== Production ===
- Bob James – executive producer
- Matt Pierson – compilation executive producer
- Fourplay – producers (1, 2, 4–12)
- Harvey Mason Sr. – producer (3), arrangements (3)
- Harvey Mason Jr. – producer (3), arrangements (3)
- Brad Gilderman – engineer (3)
- Don Murray – recording (4, 11), mixing (4, 11), original recording (12)
- Paul Brown – remixing (12), arrangements (12)
- Dan Shea – remixing (12), arrangements (12)
- Steve Vavagiskis – 2020 edition remastering
- Linda Cobb – art direction, design
