= Soul Train Music Awards =

Annual music award in African-American culture

- Current: Soul Train Awards 2026
- Awarded for: Outstanding achievements in: Soul music, Contemporary R&B, Gospel, Jazz, Reggae and Hip-hop
- Country: United States
- First award: March 23, 1987; 39 years ago
- Website: BET: Soul Train Awards

Television/radio coverage
- Network: WGN America (1987–2007); First Run Syndication (1987–2007); BET (2009–present); Centric/BET Her (2009–present)

The Soul Train Music Awards is an annual music awards ceremony which honors the best in African-American culture, music and entertainment. It is produced by the production company of Soul Train, the program from which it takes its name, and features musical performances by various contemporary R&B and soul music recording artists interspersed throughout the ceremonies. The special traditionally previously aired in February, March or April; it currently airs during the last weekend of November (in most years, Thanksgiving weekend).

The Soul Train Music Awards voting body includes active professionals in the fields of radio programming and music retail and management and recording artists with records that have charted in designated music trade publications in the year prior to proceedings. Past hosts include such R&B luminaries as Luther Vandross, Dionne Warwick, Patti LaBelle, Vanessa Williams, and Gladys Knight.

The Soul Train Music Award trophy has featured an African ceremonial mask since its 1987 introduction. A new trophy was designed by Tristan Eaton of Thunderdog Studios in 2009 and is manufactured by the New York firm Society Awards. From 1995 to 2005 a separate award show named Soul Train Lady of Soul Awards was held, honoring female artists.

== History ==
The 2008 ceremonies were not held due to several factors, including the 2007–08 Writers Guild of America strike, the ill health of Don Cornelius at the time, and Soul Train distributor Tribune Entertainment terminating operations in the wake of the sale of Tribune Media to Sam Zell. With the rights to Soul Train acquired by MadVision Entertainment, the Soul Train Music Awards were presented on November 24, 2009 on Centric.

The 2009 ceremony was held at the Georgia World Congress Center in Atlanta, marking the first time in the show's 22-year history it was held outside of the Greater Los Angeles. The 2010 awards was held on November 10 just outside Atlanta at the Cobb Energy Performing Arts Centre, and aired November 28. The 2011 show was once again held in Atlanta and aired November 27. The 2012 ceremony was held live on November 25 at Planet Hollywood Las Vegas in Las Vegas Valley, Nevada. As of 2019, Beyoncé is the most-awarded artist at the Soul Train Music Awards with 16 awards.

The ceremony was put on hiatus after the 2023 edition; of it and the 2025 suspension of the BET Hip Hop Awards, then-BET CEO Scott Mills stated in 2025 that they needed to be "[reimagined[ for this changing media landscape that we find ourselves in."

After a three-year hiatus, it was announced that the Soul Train Music Awards would return with a new format for 2026; the ceremony will be held at the Harris Theater in Chicago (the city from which Soul Train was originally produced) on November 5, 2026, and filmed for a delayed broadcast by BET, other Paramount Skydance channels, and—for the first time—CBS, on November 27, 2026. BET executive vice president of specials Connie Orlando stated that the ceremony would be "a dynamic, two-hour celebration honoring four to five musical icons, spotlighting two fan-voted categories, and featuring marquee performances from artists who have shaped and continue to redefine the sound of R&B and soul." The ceremony will be produced by Jesse Collins Entertainment.

== Trophy ==
The original trophy is a bronze abstract sitting figure known as the Vanguard in 1987. However, the trophy is an African mask which is known as the Heritage Award. Its distinctive design created by an unknown sculptor, but its remains a visual trademark for Soul Train's representation of Black music.

From 1989 to 2007, the Heritage mask remained the trophy for Soul Train Music Awards until 2009 when BET and its sister channel Centric revived the awards. Thunderdog designed a brand new trophy based on the program's mascot, an actual train.

== Ceremonies ==
#	Date	Host	Venue
01	1987	Dionne Warwick and Luther Vandross	Santa Monica Civic Auditorium, Los Angeles, California
02	1988	Dionne Warwick	Santa Monica Civic Auditorium, Los Angeles, California
03	1989	Dionne Warwick, Patti LaBelle and Ahmad Rashad	Shrine Auditorium, Los Angeles, California
04	1990	Dionne Warwick, Patti LaBelle and Luther Vandross	Shrine Auditorium, Los Angeles, California
05	1991	Dionne Warwick, Patti LaBelle and Luther Vandross	Shrine Auditorium, Los Angeles, California
06	1992	Patti LaBelle, Luther Vandross, Will Smith and Vanessa Williams	Shrine Auditorium, Los Angeles, California
07	1993	Patti LaBelle, Luther Vandross and Natalie Cole	Shrine Auditorium, Los Angeles, California
08	1994	Patti LaBelle, Gladys Knight and Johnny Gill	Shrine Auditorium, Los Angeles, California
09	1995	Patti LaBelle, Anita Baker and Babyface	Shrine Auditorium, Los Angeles, California
10	1996	Brandy, LL Cool J and Anita Baker	Shrine Auditorium, Los Angeles, California
11	1997	Brandy, LL Cool J and Gladys Knight	Shrine Auditorium, Los Angeles, California
12	1998	Patti LaBelle, Heavy D and Erykah Badu	Shrine Auditorium, Los Angeles, California
13	1999	Tyra Banks, Monica and Brian McKnight	Shrine Auditorium, Los Angeles, California
14	2000	Shemar Moore, Lisa "Left-Eye Lopes, Tamia and Eric Benét	Shrine Auditorium, Los Angeles, California
15	2001	Shemar Moore, Mýa and Queen Latifah	Shrine Auditorium, Los Angeles, California
16	2002	Shemar Moore, Arsenio Hall, Yolanda Adams and Faith Evans	Los Angeles Memorial Sport Arena, Los Angeles, California
17	2003	Queen Latifah and Arsenio Hall	Pasadena Convention Center, Pasadena, California
18	2004	Alicia Keys and Babyface	International Cultural Center Auditorium, Los Angeles, California
19	2005	Brian McKnight, Fantasia, Nick Cannon and Nicole Richie	Paramount Studios, Los Angeles, California
20	2006	Vivica A. Fox and Tyrese	Pasadena Convention Center, Pasadena, California
21	2007	LeToya Luckett and Omarion	Pasadena Convention Center, Pasadena, California
22	2009	Terrence Howard and Taraji P. Henson	Georgia World Congress Center, Atlanta
23	2010	Terrence Howard and Taraji P. Henson	Cobb Energy Performing Arts Centre, Atlanta
24	2011	Cedric the Entertainer	Cobb Energy Performing Arts Centre, Atlanta
25	2012	Cedric the Entertainer	Planet Hollywood Las Vegas, Las Vegas Strip
26	2013	Anthony Anderson	Orleans Arena, Las Vegas
27	2014	Wendy Williams	Orleans Arena, Las Vegas
28	2015	Erykah Badu	Orleans Arena, Las Vegas
29	2016	Erykah Badu	Orleans Arena, Las Vegas
30	2017	Erykah Badu	Orleans Arena, Las Vegas
31	2018	Tisha Campbell and Tichina Arnold	Orleans Arena, Las Vegas
32	2019	Tisha Campbell and Tichina Arnold	Orleans Arena, Las Vegas
33	2020	Tisha Campbell and Tichina Arnold	Held Virtually
34	2021	Tisha Campbell and Tichina Arnold	Apollo Theater, New York City
35	2022	Deon Cole	Orleans Arena, Las Vegas
36	2023	Keke Palmer	House Party, Los Angeles
37	2026	Anthony Anderson	Harris Theater, Chicago

== Soul Cypher ==
In 2015, host Erykah Badu added a new tradition to the award show, the Soul Cypher. Similar to a Hip-Hop cypher, it features a quartet of R&B/Soul/Gospel singers coming together to perform a freestyle. Accompanied by an instrumental beat and a live band, the artists deliver a freestyle arrangement by incorporating lyrics, hooks and/or titles from their popular hits. A UK version of the Soul Cypher was introduced during the 2020 broadcast.

Year	Artists	Instrumental Beat
2015	Lalah Hathaway, Eddie Levert, Chrisette Michele & K-Ci	Mobb Deep – "Shook Ones Pt. 1"
2016	Gladys Knight, Ne-Yo, Angie Stone & Tyrese	Bryson Tiller – "Don't"
2017	Bilal, Faith Evans, Fantasia & Mali Music	The Isley Brothers – "Footsteps in the Dark (Part 1 & 2)"
2018	BJ the Chicago Kid, Luke James, Queen Naija & Kelly Price	Patti LaBelle – "If Only You Knew"
2019	Keyshia Cole, Anthony Hamilton, Le'Andria Johnson & Carl Thomas	Robert Glasper – "Impromptu Medley"
2020	Chanté Moore, PJ Morton, Shanice & Stokley	Erykah Badu – "Love of My Life"
2021	Tone Stith, Koryn Hawthorne, Jac Ross, Elle Varner, & Musiq Soulchild	Aaliyah – "Rock the Boat"

=== UK Soul Cypher ===
Year	Artists	Instrumental Beat
2020	Hamzaa, Jvck James, Sinéad Harnett & Shae Universe	D'Angelo – "Lady"
2021	Nao, Ray BLK, SIPHO., Pip Millett, Jamilah Barry & Mnelia	Aaliyah – "Rock the Boat"

== Award categories ==
=== Main awards ===
- Album of the Year
- Video of the Year
- Song of the Year
- The Ashford & Simpson Songwriter's Award
- Best New Artist
- Rhythm & Bars Award
- Best R&B/Soul Male Artist
- Best R&B/Soul Female Artist
- Best Dance Performance
- Best Gospel/Inspirational Song
- Best Collaboration
- Certified Award, formerly Centric Award

=== Defunct award categories ===
- Best Gospel Album
- Best Gospel Album – Group or Band
- Best Gospel Album – Solo
- Best Jazz Album
- Best Jazz Album – Group, Band or Duo
- Best Jazz Album – Solo
- Best Rap Single
- Best Rap Album
- Best R&B/Soul Album – Male
- Best R&B/Soul Album – Female
- Best R&B/Soul Album – Group, Band or Duo
- Best R&B/Soul Single – Male
- Best R&B/Soul Single – Female
- Best R&B/Soul Single – Group, Band or Duo
- The Sprite Award for Best R&B/Soul or Rap Dance Cut

== Special awards ==
Heritage Award for Career Achievement

- 1987: Stevie Wonder
- 1988: Gladys Knight & the Pips
- 1989: Michael Jackson
- 1990: Quincy Jones
- 1991: Smokey Robinson
- 1992: Prince
- 1993: Eddie Murphy
- 1994: Barry White
- 1995: Diana Ross
- 1996: Patti LaBelle

Quincy Jones Award for Outstanding Career Achievements

- 1997: Curtis Mayfield
- 1998: Whitney Houston
- 1999: Luther Vandross
- 2001: The Isley Brothers
- 2002: The O'Jays
- 2003: LL Cool J
- 2005: Ice Cube
- 2007: Jermaine Dupri

Quincy Jones Award for Outstanding Career Achievements – Male

- 2004: R. Kelly
- 2006: Jamie Foxx

Quincy Jones Award for Outstanding Career Achievements – Female

- 2004: Janet Jackson
- 2006: Destiny's Child

Sammy Davis Jr. Award for Entertainer of the Year

- 1989: Michael Jackson
- 1990: Arsenio Hall
- 1991: M.C. Hammer
- 1992: Janet Jackson
- 1993: En Vogue
- 1994: Whitney Houston
- 1995: Queen Latifah
- 1996: Boyz II Men
- 1997: Babyface
- 1998: Puff Daddy
- 2006: John Legend
- 2007: Jennifer Hudson
- 2009: Michael Jackson

Sammy Davis Jr. Award for Entertainer of the Year – Male

- 1999: R. Kelly
- 2000: DMX
- 2001: Jay Z
- 2002: Dr. Dre
- 2003: Nelly
- 2004: OutKast
- 2005: Usher

Sammy Davis Jr. Award for Entertainer of the Year – Female

- 1999: Lauryn Hill
- 2000: Mary J. Blige
- 2001: Destiny's Child
- 2002: Alicia Keys
- 2003: Mariah Carey
- 2004: Beyoncé
- 2005: Ciara

Artist of the Decade for Extraordinary Artistic Achievements – Male

- 2000: Prince

Artist of the Decade for Extraordinary Artistic Achievements – Female

- 2000: Whitney Houston

Humanitarian Award

- 1993: Michael Jackson

Stevie Wonder Award for Outstanding Achievement in Songwriting

- 2006: R. Kelly
- 2007: Babyface

Legend Award – Male

- 2009: Charlie Wilson
- 2010: Ron Isley
- 2011: Earth Wind & Fire

Legend Award – Female

- 2009: Chaka Khan
- 2010: Anita Baker
- 2011: Gladys Knight

Lifetime Achievement Award

- 2012: New Edition
- 2013: Keith Sweat

Legend Award

- 2013: Dionne Warwick
- 2014: Kool and the Gang
- 2015: Babyface
- 2016: Teddy Riley
- 2017: Toni Braxton
- 2018: Erykah Badu
- 2019: Jimmy Jam & Terry Lewis
- 2021: Maxwell
- 2022: Morris Day & the Time
- 2023: T-Pain

Lady of Soul Award

- 2015: Jill Scott
- 2016: Brandy
- 2017: SWV
- 2018: Faith Evans
- 2019: Yolanda Adams
- 2020: Monica
- 2021: Ashanti
- 2022: Xscape

Spirit of Soul Award

- 2023: Janelle Monáe

== Most awarded artists ==
Artist(s)	No. of wins
Beyoncé	25
Chris Brown	14
Bruno Mars	14
Alicia Keys	12
Usher	12
Babyface	11
Janet Jackson	11
R. Kelly	11
Michael Jackson	10
Kirk Franklin	8
Whitney Houston	8
Anita Baker	7
Mary J. Blige	7
John Legend	7
Erykah Badu	6
Mariah Carey	6
Maxwell	6
SZA	6
Cardi B	5
Boyz II Men	5
Ciara	5
H.E.R.	5
Lauryn Hill	5
The Isley Brothers	5
TLC	5
Toni Braxton	4
Destiny's Child	4
Drake	4
Jamie Foxx	4
Jay Z	4
Lil Wayne	4
Pharrell Williams	4
B2K	3
Brandy	3
Natalie Cole	3
D'Angelo	3
En Vogue	3
Lizzo	3
LL Cool J	3
Ella Mai	3
Mary Mary	3
Miguel	3
Musiq Soulchild	3
Missy Elliott	3
Najee	3
Nelly	3
New Edition	3
OutKast	3
Rihanna	3
Jill Scott	3
Soul II Soul	3
Tyga	3
Luther Vandross	3
Kanye West	3
Barry White	3
The Winans	3
[Rema]	3
Wizkid	
2Pac	2
Gregory Abbott	2
Yolanda Adams	2
Ashanti	2
Tamar Braxton	2
Daniel Caesar	2
Cameo	2
Dr. Dre	2
Faith Evans	2
Fat Joe	2
French Montana	2
Kenny G	2
Johnny Gill	2
Dru Hill	2
Keri Hilson	2
Jagged Edge	2
Jodeci	2
Quincy Jones	2
Gladys Knight	2
Lecrae	2
Ledisi	2
LeVert	2
Remy Ma	2
Donnie McClurkin	2
Janelle Monáe	2
The Notorious B.I.G.	2
Sean Paul	2
Prince	2
Puff Daddy	2
Mark Ronson	2
Kelly Rowland	2
Run–D.M.C.	2
Trey Songz	2
Jazmine Sullivan	2
T.I.	2
Robin Thicke	2
The Weeknd	2
BeBe & CeCe Winans	2
