= Soul Train Music Award for Best Jazz Album – Group, Band or Duo =

Annual US music award

This page lists the winners and nominees for the Soul Train Music Award for Best Jazz Album – Group, Band or Duo. The award was only given out during the first two ceremonies, before being retired in 1989.

== Winners and nominees ==
Winners are listed first and highlighted in bold.

=== 1980s ===
Year	Artist	Album	Ref
1987	**Bob James and David Sanborn**	**Double Vision**	
1987	Spyro Gyra	Breakout	
1987	Hiroshima	Another Place	
1987	The Yellowjackets	Shades	
1988	**Hiroshima**	**Go**	
1988	George Benson and Earl Klugh	Collaboration	
1988	Freddie Hubbard	Life Flight	
1988	Pat Metheny Group	Still Life (Talking)	

== See also ==
- Soul Train Music Award for Best Jazz Album
- Soul Train Music Award for Best Jazz Album – Solo
