= Funk in a Mason Jar =

Studio album by Harvey Mason
- Released: 1977
- Genres: Jazz fusion, jazz-funk, jazz
- Label: Arista Records

Harvey Mason chronology
Earth Mover (1977)	Funk in a Mason Jar (1977)	Groovin' You (1979)

Funk in a Mason Jar is the third studio album by jazz artist Harvey Mason, released in 1977 by Eleni. The album peaked at No. 9 on the US Billboard Top Jazz LPs chart and No. 37 on the US Billboard Top Soul Albums chart

== Guest artists ==
Artists such as Lee Ritenour, Al McKay and Verdine White of Earth, Wind & Fire, Ray Parker Jr, Louis Johnson of the Brothers Johnson, and George Benson appear on the album.

== Critical reception ==
Professional ratings
Review scores
Source	Rating
AllMusic	3/5 stars

AllMusic gave Funk in a Mason Jar a 3/5-star rating.

== Track listing ==
No.	Title	Writer(s)	Length
1.	"Pack Up Your Bags"	Art Wilson, Harvey Mason, Skip Scarborough	5:00
2.	"Till You Take My Love"	David Foster, Harvey Mason	3:30
3.	"Space Cadets"	Dave Grusin, Louis Johnson, Ray Parker, Jr. Harvey Mason	3:35
4.	"Freedom Either Way"	Harvey Mason	3:36
5.	"Funk in a Mason Jar"	Harvey Mason	1:56
6.	"What's Going On?"	Renaldo Benson, Al Cleveland, Marvin Gaye	8:31
7.	"Set It Free"	Eva Ein, Kenny Loggins	5:54
8.	"Phantazia"	Dave Grusin	4:29
9.	"Liquid"	Harvey Mason	4:38
