= Carnegie Hall Concert (Gerry Mulligan and Chet Baker album) =

Live album by Gerry Mulligan and Chet Baker
- Released: 1975
- Recorded: November 24, 1974
- Venue: Carnegie Hall, NYC
- Genre: Jazz
- Length: 77:43
- Label: CTI; CTI 6054/55
- Producer: Creed Taylor

Gerry Mulligan chronology
Gerry Mulligan Meets Astor Piazzola (1974)	Carnegie Hall Concert (1975)	Gerry Mulligan Meets Enrico Intra (1982)

Chet Baker chronology
She Was Too Good to Me (1974)	Carnegie Hall Concert (1974)	Deep In a Dream of You (1975)

Carnegie Hall Concert is a live album by saxophonist Gerry Mulligan and trumpeter Chet Baker. The album was recorded at Carnegie Hall in 1974 and released on the CTI label both as a double LP and as two separate volumes. In 1995 the album was re-released as a CD with an additional track.

== Reception ==
Professional ratings
Review scores
Source	Rating
Allmusic	4/5 stars
The Penguin Guide to Jazz Recordings	3/4 stars

The Allmusic review by Scott Yanow states: "At this 1974 concert baritonist Gerry Mulligan and trumpeter Chet Baker had one of their very rare reunions; it would be only the second and final time that they recorded together after Mulligan's original quartet broke up in 1953. Oddly enough, a fairly contemporary rhythm section was used. However, some of the old magic was still there between the horns".

== Track listing ==
All compositions by Gerry Mulligan except where noted

1. "Line for Lyons" – 8:16
2. "Margarine" (Hal Galper) – 5:59 Additional track on CD reissue
3. "For an Unfinished Woman" – 8:51
4. "My Funny Valentine" (Richard Rodgers, Lorenz Hart) – 8:42
5. "Song for Strayhorn" – 9:42
6. "It's Sandy at the Beach" – 9:39
7. "K-4 Pacific" – 11:46
8. "There Will Never Be Another You" (Harry Warren, Mack Gordon) – 6:53
9. "Bernie's Tune" (Bernie Miller, Jerry Leiber, Mike Stoller) – 7:55

== Personnel ==
- Gerry Mulligan – baritone saxophone (tracks 1, 3–7 & 9)
- Chet Baker – trumpet (tracks 1, 2, 4, 6, 8 & 9), vocal (track 8)
- Ed Byrne – trombone (tracks 2 & 8)
- Bob James – piano, electric piano
- Dave Samuels – vibraphone, percussion (tracks 1–3 & 6–9)
- John Scofield – guitar (tracks 1,3 & 5–9)
- Ron Carter – bass
- Harvey Mason – drums
