= X (Fourplay album) =

Studio album by Fourplay
- Released: August 8, 2006
- Studios: Glenwood Place Studios and Track Record Studios (Burbank, California)
- Genre: Jazz
- Length: 46:52
- Label: Arista
- Producer: Fourplay

Fourplay chronology
Journey (2004)	X (2006)	Energy (2008)

Professional ratings
Review scores
Source	Rating
AllMusic	3/5 stars

X is the ninth studio album by Fourplay, released in 2006.

== Track listing ==
1. "Turnabout" (Bob James) – 6:21
2. "Cinnamon Sugar" (Larry Carlton) – 4:48
3. "Eastern Sky" (Marcel East, Nathan East) – 6:37
4. "Kid Zero" (Harvey Mason Sr.) – 4:48
5. "My Love's Leavin'"; feat. Michael McDonald (Vivian Stanshall, Steve Winwood) – 5:11
6. "Screenplay" (Bob James) – 6:04
7. "Twilight Touch" (Harvey Mason Sr.) – 4:57
8. "Be My Lover" (Larry Carlton, Nathan East) – 4:13
9. "Sunday Morning" (Nathan East) – 3:53

== Personnel ==
Fourplay

- Bob James – keyboards
- Larry Carlton – guitars
- Nathan East – bass, vocals (1, 3, 8)
- Harvey Mason – drums

Additional Personnel

- Michael McDonald – vocals (5)
- Kevin DiSimone – additional backing vocals (5)
- Michele Pillar – vocals (8)

== Production ==
- Larry Hamby – A&R
- Fourplay – producers
- Ken Freeman – additional production, recording, mixing
- Kennie Takahashi – recording assistant
- Csaba Petozc – additional engineer (8)
- Shannon Forrest – vocal engineer (5)
- Steve Vavagiakis – mastering at Bang Zoom Mastering (Tappan, New York)
- Rick Wheeler – guitar and bass technician
- Debbie Johnson – production coordinator
- Frank Harkins – art direction
- Vivian Ng – design
- Michael Waring – photography

Crew

- Ken Freeman – house engineer, keyboard technician
- Rick Wheeler – guitar and bass technician
- Kris Uriezewa – monitor engineer
- Sonny Abelardo – lighting designer, tour manager
