= Fourplay =

American smooth jazz quartet

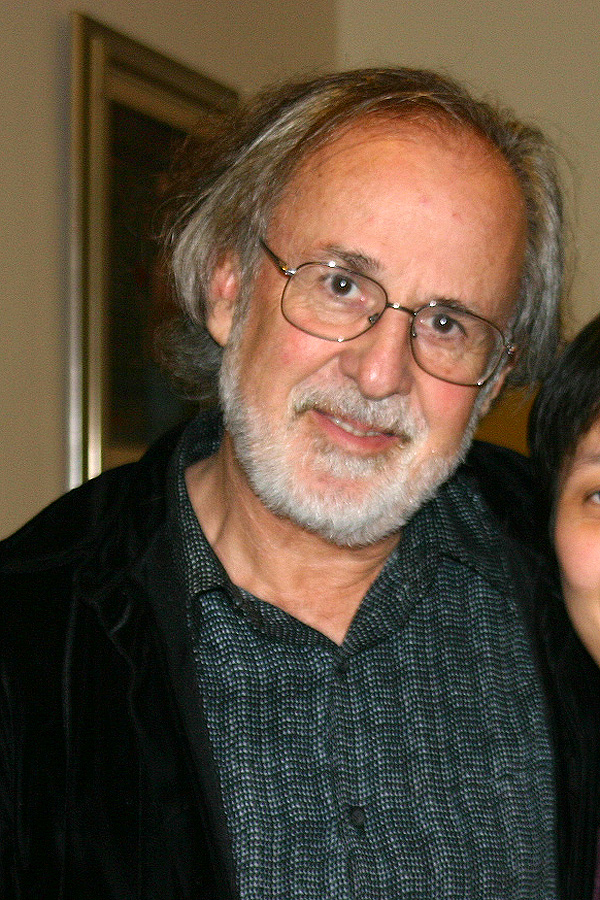
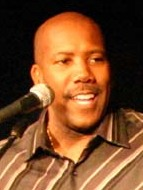
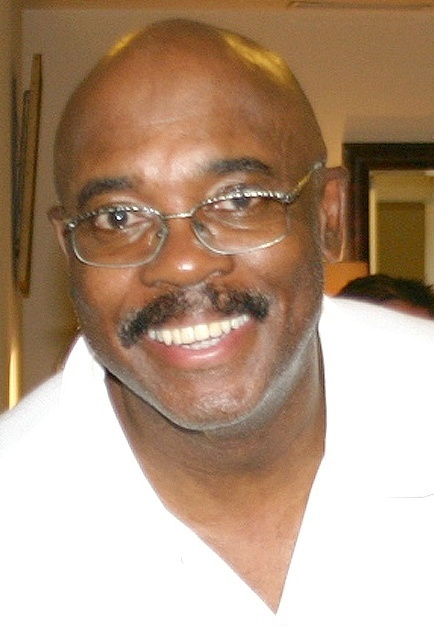
- Bob James, 2004; Nathan East, 2005; and Harvey Mason, 2004

Background information
- Genre: Smooth jazz
- Years active: 1991–present (Indefinite hiatus since 2017)
- Labels: Warner Bros., Arista/Bluebird, Heads Up
- Members: Bob James; Nathan East; Harvey Mason
- Past members: Lee Ritenour; Larry Carlton; Chuck Loeb (deceased)
- Website: fourplayjazz.com

Fourplay (stylized as fOURPLAY) is a contemporary American smooth jazz quartet. The original members of the group were Bob James (keyboards), Lee Ritenour (guitars), Nathan East (bass), and Harvey Mason (drums).

In 1997, Ritenour left the group and Fourplay chose Larry Carlton as his replacement. In 2010, Carlton left Fourplay and was replaced by Chuck Loeb, who died on July 31, 2017. During Loeb's illness, saxophonist Kirk Whalum joined the group for performances.

The group has enjoyed consistent artistic and commercial success by grafting elements of R&B and pop to jazz, appealing to a broad mainstream audience. Their debut album, Fourplay (1991), sold over a million copies and remained at the number one position on the Billboard contemporary jazz chart for 33 weeks. Their next album, Between the Sheets (1993), reached number one, went gold, and received a Grammy Award nomination. In 1995, their third gold album, Elixir, also was number one and remained on the chart for more than 90 weeks. In 2015 the band celebrated its 25th anniversary with the release of the album Silver with former members Ritenour and Carlton.

== Members ==
- Bob James – keyboards
- Nathan East – bass
- Harvey Mason – drums

=== Former members ===
- Lee Ritenour – guitars
- Larry Carlton – guitars
- Chuck Loeb – guitars (died 2017)

=== Live members ===
- Kirk Whalum - saxophone

== Discography ==
Title	Label	Released
Fourplay	Warner Bros.	1991
Fourplay Live: The Authorized Bootleg	Warner Bros.	1992
Between the Sheets	Warner Bros.	1993
Elixir	Warner Bros.	1995
The Best of Fourplay – (original release)	Warner Bros.	1997
4	Warner Bros.	1998
Snowbound	Warner Bros.	1999
Yes, Please!	Warner Bros.	2000
Heartfelt	Bluebird	2002
Journey	Bluebird	2004
X	Bluebird	2006
Energy	Heads Up	2008
Let's Touch the Sky	Heads Up	2010
Esprit De Four	Heads Up	2012
Silver	Heads Up	2015
The Best of Fourplay – (2020 Remastered)	evosound	2020

== DVD-Video ==
- An Evening of Fourplay Volumes I and II (1994)
- Live in Cape Town (2005)
- Live at San Javier Jazz Festival (2006)
