= Fourplay (Fourplay album) =

Studio album by Fourplay
- Released: September 17, 1991
- Recorded: 1990–1991
- Studio: Ocean Way Recording and Sunset Sound (Hollywood, California); Pyramid Studios (Los Angeles, California); Starlight Studios (Malibu, California)
- Genre: Jazz
- Length: 62:38
- Label: Warner Bros.
- Producer: Fourplay

Fourplay chronology
Fourplay (1991)	Between the Sheets (1993)

Professional ratings
Review scores
Source	Rating
AllMusic	4/5 stars

Fourplay is the debut album by the American smooth jazz group Fourplay released in 1991 on Warner Bros. records. The album went to number 1 on the Contemporary Jazz charts, number 16 on the R&B charts and number 97 on the US Billboard 200. Fourplay has also been certified Gold in the US by the RIAA.

== Overview ==
With this debut LP Fourplay's original lineup consisted of keyboardist Bob James, guitarist Lee Ritenour, bassist Nathan East and drummer Harvey Mason.

== Track listing ==
No.	Title	Writer(s)	Length
1.	"Bali Run"	Lee Ritenour, Bob James	5:32
2.	"101 Eastbound"	Nathan East, Marcel East	5:57
3.	"Foreplay"	Lee Ritenour	5:26
4.	"Moonjogger"	Bob James	6:16
5.	"Max-O-Man"	Harvey Mason, Sr., Michael Lang	5:33
6.	"After the Dance" (featuring El DeBarge)	Marvin Gaye, Arthur Ross, Leon Ware	6:05
7.	"Quadrille"	Bob James	5:43
8.	"Midnight Stroll"	Harvey Mason, Sr.	4:44
9.	"October Morning"	Lee Ritenour	5:01
10.	"Wish You Were Here"	Lee Ritenour	6:11
11.	"Rain Forest"	Bob James	6:05

== Personnel ==
Fourplay

- Bob James – Yamaha C7 MIDI grand piano, keyboards, synthesizers, programming
- Lee Ritenour – electric guitars, electric classical guitars, guitar synthesizer
- Nathan East – 5-string bass, 6-string bass, backing vocals (6)
- Harvey Mason – drums

Additional musicians

- Harvey Mason Jr. – synthesizer programming, Atari computer programming
- El DeBarge – lead vocals (6), backing vocals (6)
- Darryl DeBarge – backing vocals (6)
- Patti LaBelle – backing vocals (6), BGV arrangements (6)
- Philip Bailey – backing vocals (11)

Production

- Bob James – executive producer
- Fourplay – producers
- Don Murray – recording, mixing
- Geoff Gillette – additional recording
- Khaliq Glover – additional recording
- Femi Jiya – additional recording
- Mike Kloster – assistant engineer
- Paul May – assistant engineer
- Clif Norrell – assistant engineer
- Harvey Mason Jr. – technical assistance
- Robert Vosgien – digital editing
- Wally Traugott – mastering at Capitol Mastering (Hollywood, California).
- Debra Johnson – production coordinator
- Kim Champagne – art direction
- Leslie Wintner – design
- Stuart Watson – photography
- O'Brien and Schridde – band photography

Track information and credits adapted from AllMusic

== Charts ==
=== Weekly charts ===
Chart (1991–1992)	Peak position
US Billboard 200	97
US Top Contemporary Jazz Albums (Billboard)	1
US Top R&B/Hip-Hop Albums (Billboard)	16

=== Year-end charts ===
Chart (1992)	Position
US Top R&B/Hip-Hop Albums (Billboard)	67
