= Between the Sheets (Fourplay album) =

Studio album by Fourplay
- Released: August 17, 1993
- Studio: Sunset Sound (Hollywood, California) Pyramid Sound Recording Studios (Ithaca, New York)
- Genre: Jazz
- Length: 67:32
- Label: Warner Bros.
- Producer: Fourplay

Fourplay chronology
Fourplay (1991)	Between the Sheets (1993)	Elixir (1995)

Between the Sheets is the second studio album of the jazz group Fourplay which was released in August 1993 on Warner Bros. Records. The album peaked at No. 2 on the Billboard Top Jazz Albums chart and No. 15 on the Billboard Top R&B Albums chart. Between the Sheets has sold over 500,000 copies in the United States and has thus been certified gold by the RIAA.

== Critical reception ==
Professional ratings
Review scores
Source	Rating
Allmusic	2.5/5 stars

Between the Sheets was Grammy nominated in the category of Best Contemporary Jazz Performance (Instrumental)

== Track listing ==
No.	Title	Writer(s)	Length
1.	"Chant"	Bob James	6:24
2.	"Monterey"	Lee Ritenour	6:12
3.	"Between the Sheets"	Ernie Isley, Marvin Isley, O'Kelly Isley, Ronald Isley, Rudolph Isley, Chris Jasper	6:45
4.	"Li'l Darlin'"	Neal Hefti	5:16
5.	"Flying East"	Marcel East, Nathan East	6:08
6.	"Once in the A.M."	Lee Ritenour	6:30
7.	"Gulliver"	Bob James	6:48
8.	"Amoroso"	Harvey Mason	5:48
9.	"A Summer Child"	Lee Ritenour	5:33
10.	"Anthem"	Harvey Mason	5:39
11.	"Song for Somalia"	Harvey Mason	6:29

== Personnel ==
Fourplay

- Bob James – Yamaha C7 MIDI grand piano, Yamaha Disklavier piano, synthesizers, synth orchestrations, arrangements (1, 3, 4, 7)
- Lee Ritenour – electric guitars, electric classical guitar, guitar synthesizer, additional guitar synth parts (2, 3, 5, 8), arrangements (2, 3, 6, 9)
- Nathan East – 5 and 6-string bass guitars, fretless basses, lead chant (1), chorus chant (1), lead vocals (3), backing vocals (3), arrangements (3, 5)
- Harvey Mason – drums, percussion, marimba, vibraphone, chimes, glockenspiel, arrangements (3, 8, 10, 11)

Additional Musicians

- Harvey Mason, Jr. – synthesizer programming, computer sequencing, drum programming (3)
- Marcel East – arrangements (5)
- Dee Fredrix – chorus chant (1)
- Chaka Khan – lead vocals (3), backing vocals (3)
- Phillip Bailey – backing vocals (3)
- Chanté Moore – backing vocals (3)
- Phil Perry – backing vocals (3)

Production

- Bob James – executive producer
- Fourplay – producers
- Don Murray – recording, mixing
- Neal Avron – assistant engineer, additional engineer
- Mike Kloster – assistant engineer, additional engineer
- Mike Piersante – assistant engineer, additional engineer
- Marcel East – additional engineer (Nathan East's vocals)
- Harvey Mason, Jr. – technical assistance
- Robert Vosgien – digital editing, additional editing, additional mastering
- Wally Traugott – mastering
- CMS Digital (Pasadena, California) – editing location
- Capitol Mastering (Hollywood, California) – mastering location
- Debra Johnson – production coordinator
- Kim Champagne – art direction, design
- Stuart Watson – photography

== Charts ==
Album – Billboard
Year	Chart	Position
1993	The Billboard 200	70
1993	Top Contemporary Jazz Albums	1
1993	Top R&B/Hip-Hop Albums	15

Singles – Billboard
Title	Year	Chart	Position
Between the Sheets	1993	Hot R&B/Hip-Hop Singles & Tracks	72
Chant	1994	Hot R&B/Hip-Hop Singles & Tracks	98
