= Elixir (Fourplay album) =

Studio album by Fourplay
- Released: 1995
- Studio: Sunset Sound (Hollywood, California) Masong Studios (Los Angeles, California) Starlight Studios (Malibu, California) DARP Studios (Atlanta, Georgia) Remidi Studios (Ardsley-on-Hudson, New York)
- Genre: Jazz
- Length: 63:46
- Label: Warner Bros.
- Producer: Fourplay

Fourplay chronology
Between the Sheets (1993)	Elixir (1995)	The Best of Fourplay (1997)

Elixir is the third studio album by Fourplay, released in 1995. Among the guest vocalists on this album are Phil Collins, Patti Austin, and Peabo Bryson.

== Track listing ==
No.	Title	Writer(s)	Length
1.	"Elixir"	East, James, Mason, Ritenour	7:23
2.	"Dream Come True"	East, Ricky Lawson	5:15
3.	"Play Lady Play"	James, Ritenour	4:36
4.	"Why Can't It Wait 'Til Morning?" (featuring Phil Collins)	Collins	5:17
5.	"Magic Carpet Ride"	Ritenour	6:27
6.	"Whisper in My Ear"	James	6:12
7.	"Fannie Mae"	Mason	5:31
8.	"The Closer I Get to You" (featuring Patti Austin and Peabo Bryson)	Reggie Lucas, James Mtume	5:01
9.	"East 2 West"	N. East, Marcel East	5:56
10.	"Licorice"	James	5:12
11.	"In My Corner"	H. Mason, Harvey Mason, Jr.	6:56
Total length:			63:46

== Personnel ==
Fourplay

- Bob James – Yamaha C7 MIDI grand piano, keyboards, synthesizers, programming, synthesizer orchestrations, arrangements (4, 8)
- Lee Ritenour – electric guitars, electric classical guitar, guitar synthesizer, additional synthesizer and computer programming, arrangements (3)
- Nathan East – 5 and 6-string bass guitars, fretless bass, vocals (5, 9), vocal arrangements (8), arrangements (8), scat (9)
- Harvey Mason – drums, acoustic percussion, electronic percussion, bongos, marimba, Jew's harp, arrangements (8)

Additional musicians

- Harvey Mason, Jr. – synthesizer and computer programming, vocal arrangements (11)
- Ken Freeman – additional synthesizer and computer programming
- Phil Collins – vocals (4)
- Patti Austin – vocals (8)
- Peabo Bryson – vocals (8)
- Vern Arnold – backing vocals (11)
- Cisco – backing vocals (11)
- Heather Mason – backing vocals (11)

== Production ==
- Bob James – executive producer
- Fourplay – producers
- Nathan East – vocal producer (8)
- Don Murray – recording, mixing
- Thom Kidd – additional recording
- Harvey Mason, Jr. – additional recording
- Lee Ritenour – additional recording
- Mike Kloster – assistant engineer
- Kevin Lively – assistant engineer
- Phil Collins' vocals recorded in Europe
- Robert Vosgien – digital editing at CMS Digital (Pasadena, California)
- Wally Traugott – mastering at Mastered at Capitol Mastering (Hollywood, California)
- Linda Cobb – art direction, design
- James Minchin – photography
- Debra Johnson – production coordinator

== Reception ==
Professional ratings
Review scores
Source	Rating
Allmusic	4/5 stars
