= Harvey Mason =

American drummer (born 1947)

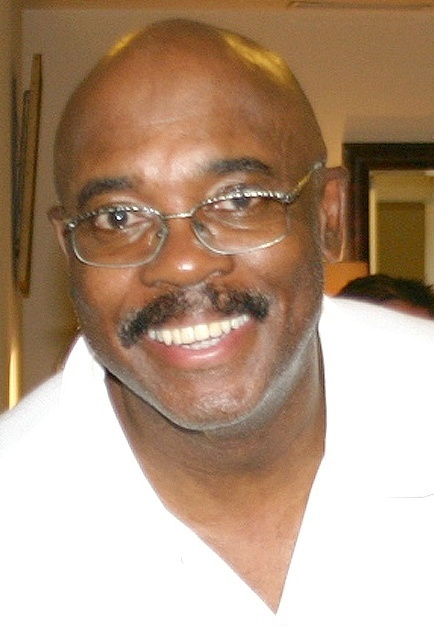
- Mason in 2004

Background information
- Born: Harvey William Mason; February 22, 1947 (age 79); Atlantic City, New Jersey, U.S.
- Genres: Jazz, jazz fusion, smooth jazz, jazz funk, jazz rock, crossover jazz
- Occupations: Musician, producer, composer
- Instruments: Drums, percussion
- Years active: 1970–present
- Labels: Arista Records, Atlantic, Concord
- Website: harveymason.net

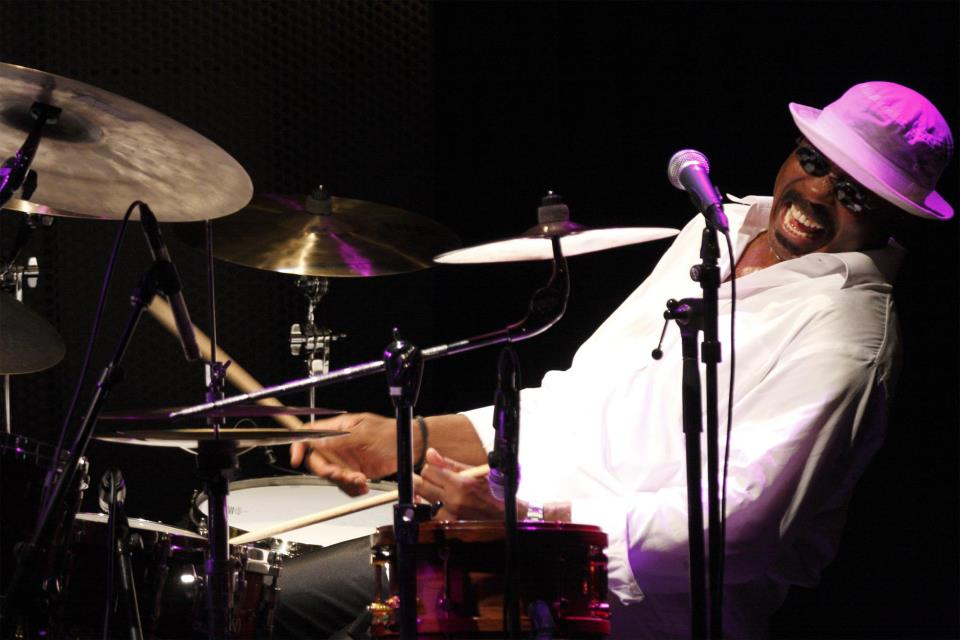
Mason performing

Harvey William Mason (born February 22, 1947) is an American jazz drummer, record producer, and member of the band Fourplay. He was the original drummer for Herbie Hancock's band The Headhunters.

== Life and career ==
Mason was born and grew up in Atlantic City, New Jersey, United States, and attended Atlantic City High School. He began playing drums at the age of four with the support of his father, a drummer in the army band.

He was the original drummer for The Headhunters, the jazz fusion band led by Herbie Hancock. After leaving Headhunters in the early 1970s, Mason co-founded the jazz quartet Fourplay. They are on an indefinite hiatus as of 2017. Mason has played as a sideman with Bill Withers, George Benson, and Lee Ritenour.

Mason, who attended Berklee for a year and a half in the 1960s, eventually transferred to New England Conservatory where he studied with Vic Firth. He was awarded an Honorary Doctorate at Berklee's 2015 Commencement Ceremony for his achievement and influence in music and enduring contributions to American and international culture.

== Equipment ==
Mason endorses Canopus drums, Murat Diril cymbals, Remo drumheads, DW pedals, and Vic Firth drumsticks. Mason has his own Vic Firth Harvey Mason signature drumstick and Vic Firth Harvey Mason Chameleon signature drumstick.

== Influences ==
Mason has cited Art Taylor, Art Blakey, Roy Haynes, Max Roach, Philly Joe Jones, Elvin Jones, Pistol Allen, Jabo Starks, Tony Williams, Buddy Rich, Steve Gadd, Jimmy Cobb, Joe Chambers, and Billy Higgins as influences.

== Discography ==
=== As leader ===
- Marching in the Street (Arista Records, 1976)
- Earth Mover (Arista, 1977)
- Funk in a Mason Jar (Arista, 1977)
- Groovin' You (Arista, 1979)
- M.V.P (Arista, 1981)
- Stone Mason (Atlantic,1982)
- Ratamacue (Atlantic,1996)
- Trios (Videoarts Music, 2003)
- With All My Heart (Videoarts Music, 2003)
- Changing Partners (Videoarts Music, 2006)
- Chameleon (Concord, 2014)

=== As a member ===
With The Headhunters

- Survival of the Fittest (Eleni, 1975)

With Fourplay

- Fourplay (Warner Bros., 1991)
- Between the Sheets (Warner Bros., 1993)
- Elixir (Warner Bros., 1995)
- The Best of Fourplay (Warner Bros., 1997)
- 4 (Warner Bros., 1998)
- Snowbound (Warner Bros., 1999)
- Yes, Please! (Warner Bros., 2000)
- Heartfelt (Bluebird, 2002)
- Journey (Bluebird, 2004)
- X (Bluebird, 2006)
- Energy (Heads Up, 2008)
- Let's Touch the Sky (Heads Up, 2010)
- Esprit de Four (Heads Up, 2012)
- Silver (Heads Up, 2015)

=== As sideman ===
With George Benson

- Breezin' (Warner Bros., 1976)
- In Flight (Warner Bros., 1977)
- Weekend in L.A. (Warner Bros., 1978) – live rec. 1977
- Collaboration with Earl Klugh (Warner Bros., 1987)
- Guitar Man (Concord Jazz, 2011)

With The Brothers Johnson

- Look Out for #1 (A&M, 1976)
- Right on Time (A&M, 1977)
- Blam! (A&M, 1978)

With Donald Byrd

- Street Lady (Blue Note, 1973)
- Stepping into Tomorrow (Blue Note, 1975) – rec. 1974
- Places and Spaces (Blue Note, 1975)
- Caricatures (Blue Note, 1976)

With Ron Carter

- Pastels (Milestone, 1976)
- When Skies Are Grey... (Somethin' Else, 2001) – rec. 2000

With Casiopea

- 4x4 (Alfa, 1982)
- Light and Shadows (Pony Canyon, 1997)

With DeBarge

- The DeBarges (Gordy, 1981)
- In a Special Way (Gordy, 1983)

With Will Downing

- Love's the Place to Be (Mercury, 1993)
- Moods (Mercury, 1995)
- Invitation Only (Mercury, 1997)

With Herbie Hancock

- Head Hunters (Columbia, 1973)
- Man-Child (Columbia, 1975) – rec. 1974-1975
- Sunlight (Columbia, 1978)
- Mr. Hands (Columbia, 1980)
- Mr. Funk (Columbia, 1998) – compilation rec. 1972-1988

With Gene Harris

- In a Special Way (Blue Note, 1976)
- Tone Tantrum (Blue Note, 1977)

With Bobbi Humphrey

- Blacks and Blues (Blue Note, 1973)
- Satin Doll (Blue Note, 1974)
- Fancy Dancer (Blue Note, 1975)

With Bob James

- Three (CTI, 1976) – rec. 1975-1976
- One on One (Tappan Zee, 1979)
- In Hi-Fi (Audio Fidelity, 2003)
- Angels of Shanghai (Universal, 2006) – rec. 2004-2005

With Carole King

- Rhymes & Reasons (Ode, 1972)
- Fantasy (Ode, 1973)

With Barry Manilow

- Showstoppers (Arista, 1991)
- This Is My Town: Songs of New York (Decca, 2017)

With Sérgio Mendes

- Sergio Mendes (Elektra, 1975)
- Homecooking (Elektra, 1976)

With Minnie Riperton

- Minnie (Capitol, 1979)
- Love Lives Forever (Capitol, 1980)

With Lee Ritenour

- Gentle Thoughts (JVC, 1977)
- Captain Fingers (Epic, 1977)
- Sugar Loaf Express (JVC, 1977)
- Earth Run (GRP, 1986)
- Portrait (GRP, 1987)
- Stolen Moments (GRP, 1990)
- Wes Bound (GRP, 1993) – rec. 1992
- Overtime (Peak, 2005) – rec. 2004
- Six String Theory (Concord, 2010)

With Patrice Rushen

- Before the Dawn (Prestige, 1975)
- Now (Elektra, 1984) – rec. 1983-1984

With Moacir Santos

- Saudade (Blue Note, 1974)
- Carnival of the Spirits (Blue Note, 1975)

With Diane Schuur

- Blues for Schuur (GRP, 1997)
- Midnight (Concord, 2003)

With Stanley Turrentine

- Have You Ever Seen the Rain (Fantasy, 1975)
- Everybody Come On Out (Fantasy, 1976)
- Wonderland (Blue Note, 1987) – rec. 1986
- Do You Have Any Sugar? (Concord, 1999)

With Dionne Warwick

- Dionne Warwick Sings Cole Porter (Eleni, 1990)
- Friends Can Be Lovers (Eleni, 1993)

With Grover Washington Jr.

- Mister Magic (Kudu, 1975) – rec. 1974
- A Secret Place (Kudu, 1976)
- The Best Is Yet to Come (Elektra, 1982)

With Bill Withers

- Making Music (CBS, 1975)
- 'Bout Love (Columbia, 1979) – rec. 1978

With others

- Arthur Adams, I Love Love Love My Lady (A&M, 1979)
- Christina Aguilera, My Kind of Christmas (RCA, 2000)
- Herb Alpert, Midnight Sun (A&M, 1992)
- Patti Austin, Love Is Gonna Getcha (GRP, 1990)
- Chet Atkins, Street Dreams (Columbia, 1986)
- Beck, The Information (Idenscope, 2006)
- Mary J. Blige, The Breakthrough (Geffen, 2005)
- Dee Dee Bridgewater, Just Family (Elektra, 1977)
- James Brown, Hell (Polydor, 1974)
- Irene Cara, Carasmatic (Elektra, 1987)
- Keith Carradine, I'm Easy (Asylum, 1976)
- Larry Carlton, Deep into It (Warner Bros., 2001)
- Jean Carn, Trust Me (Motown, 1982)
- Cher, Stars (Warner Bros., 1975)
- Merry Clayton, Beautiful Scars (Motown, 2021)
- Natalie Cole, Stardust (Elektra, 1996)
- Rita Coolidge, Behind the Memories (Canyon, 1996)
- Chick Corea, The Mad Hatter (Polydor, 1978)
- Miles Davis & Michel Legrand, Dingo (Warner Bros., 1991)
- Terence Trent D'Arby, Symphony or Damn (Columbia, 1993)
- The 5th Dimension, Earthbound (ABC, 1975)
- Charles Earland, Leaving This Planet (Prestige, 1974)
- Earth, Wind & Fire, Spirit (Columbia, 1976)
- Joe Farrell, Night Dancing (Warner Bros., 1978)
- Victor Feldman, Audiophile (JVC, 1997)
- Roberta Flack, Oasis (Atlantic, 1988)
- Robben Ford, Bringing It Back Home (Provogue, 2013)
- Michael Franks, Objects of Desire (Warner Bros., 1982)
- The Friends of Distinction, Love Can Make It Easier (RCA Victor, 1973)
- Hiroshi Fukumura with Sadao Watanabe, Hunt Up Wind (Flying Disk, 1978)
- Terry Garthwaite, Terry (Eleni, 1975)
- Jim Gold, I Can't Face Another Day Without You (Tabu, 1977)
- Lesley Gore, Love Me By Name (A&M, 1976)
- Dave Grusin and Lee Ritenour, Harlequin (GRP, 1985)
- Don Grusin, The Hang (Sovereign Artists, 2004)
- Lani Hall, Blush (A&M, 1980)
- Tramaine Hawkins, To a Higher Place (Columbia, 1994)
- Eddie Henderson, Sunburst (Blue Note, 1975)
- Joe Henderson, Black Miracle (Milestone, 1976)
- Bobby Hutcherson, Montara (Blue Note, 1975)
- Phyllis Hyman, Phyllis Hyman (Buddah, 1977)
- James Ingram, It's Your Night (Qwest, 1983)
- Yosui Inoue, Nishoku no Koma (Polydor, 1974)
- Jessy J, Hot Sauce (Heads Up International, 2011)
- Ahmad Jamal, Genetic Walk (20th Century, 1980)
- Jamiroquai, Dynamite (Epic, 2005)
- Dr. John, In a Sentimental Mood (Warner Bros., 1989)
- Jack Jones, New Jack Swing (Linn, 1997)
- The Keane Brothers, The Keane Brothers (20th Century, 1977)
- Eddie Kendricks, The Hit Man (Tamla, 1975)
- Earl Klugh, Earl Klugh (Blue Note, 1974)
- Patti LaBelle, Winner in You (MCA, 1986)
- Hubert Laws, The San Francisco Concert (CTI, 1977) – live
- Peggy Lee, Let's Love (Atlantic, 1974)
- John Legend, Once Again (Sony Urban, 2006)
- Chuck Loeb, Plain 'n' Simple (Tweety, 2011)
- Kenny Loggins, Celebrate Me Home (Columbia, 1977)
- Jackie Lomax, Livin' For Lovin' (Capitol, 1976)
- Jon Lucien, Song for My Lady (Columbia, 1975)
- Cheryl Lynn, Cheryl Lynn (Columbia, 1978)
- Wade Marcus, Metamorphosis (ABC, 1976)
- Marilyn McCoo, Billy Davis Jr., Marilyn & Billy (Columbia, 1978)
- Michael McDonald, Motown (Motown, 2003)
- Lonette McKee, Words and Music (Warner Bros., 1978)
- Carmen McRae, Can't Hide Love (Blue Note, 1976)
- Luis Miguel, Aries (Warner Bros., 1993)
- Keb' Mo', Peace...Back by Popular Demand (Sony, 2004)
- Tim Moore, White Shadows (Asylum, 1977)
- Gerry Mulligan and Chet Baker, Carnegie Hall Concert (CTI, 1975)
- Walter Murphy, Walter Murphy's Discosymphony (New York, 1979)
- David "Fathead" Newman, Scratch My Back (Prestige, 1979)
- Joe Pass, Whitestone (Pablo, 1985)
- Esther Phillips, All About (Mercury, 1978)
- Michele Pillar, I Hear Angels Calling (335, 2006)
- Daniel Powter, Under the Radar (Warner Bros., 2008)
- Helen Reddy, Music, Music (Capitol, 1976)
- Lee Ritenour & Larry Carlton, Larry & Lee (GRP, 1995)
- Rockie Robbins, I Believe in Love (A&M, 1981)
- Rufus, Numbers (ABC, 1979)
- Véronique Sanson, Le Maudit (Warner Bros., 1974)
- Masahiko Satoh, All-In All-Out (CBS/Sony, 1979)
- Seal, Seal (ZTT, 1994)
- Seals and Crofts, Diamond Girl (Warner Bros., 1973)
- Marlena Shaw, Who Is This Bitch, Anyway? (Blue Note, 1975)
- Charlie Shoemake, Collaboration (Pausa, 1985)
- Phoebe Snow, It Looks Like Snow (Columbia, 1976)
- Rod Stewart, It Had to Be You: The Great American Songbook (BMG, 2002)
- The Singers Unlimited, A Special Blend (MPS, 1976)
- Johnny "Hammond" Smith, Gears (Milestone, 1975)
- Donna Summer, Donna Summer (Geffen, 1982)
- Gábor Szabó, Macho (Salvation, 1975)
- Tavares, Supercharged (Capitol, 1980)
- The Manhattan Transfer, Tonin' (Atlantic, 1995)
- Jimmy Webb, El Mirage (Atlantic, 1977)
- The Whispers, Imagination (Solar, 1980)
- Joe Williams, Feel the Spirit (Telarc, 1995)
- Vanessa Williams, The Comfort Zone (Mercury, 1991)
- Bobby Womack, Someday We'll All Be Free (Beverly Glen, 1985)
- Renn Woods, Out of the Woods (Columbia, 1979)
- Stevie Woods, The Woman in My Life (Cotillion, 1982)
- Gary Wright, Headin' Home (Warner Bros., 1979)
- Syreeta Wright, Syreeta (Tamla, 1980)

=== Charted singles ===
Year	Title	Peak chart positions			Album
Year	Title	Hot R&B Hip-Hop Songs	Dance Club Songs	Smooth Jazz Airplay	Album
1976	"Marching in the Street"	93	—	—N/a	Marching in the Street
1978	"Till You Take My Love"	57	—	—N/a	Funk in a Mason Jar
1979	"Groovin' You"	58	32	—N/a	Groovin' You
1981	"We Can Start Tonight"	55	94	—N/a	M.V.P.
2014	"If I Ever Lose This Heaven" (featuring Chris Turner)	—	—	19	Chameleon
"—" denotes a recording that did not chart.
