= Chuck Loeb =

American jazz guitarist (1955–2017)

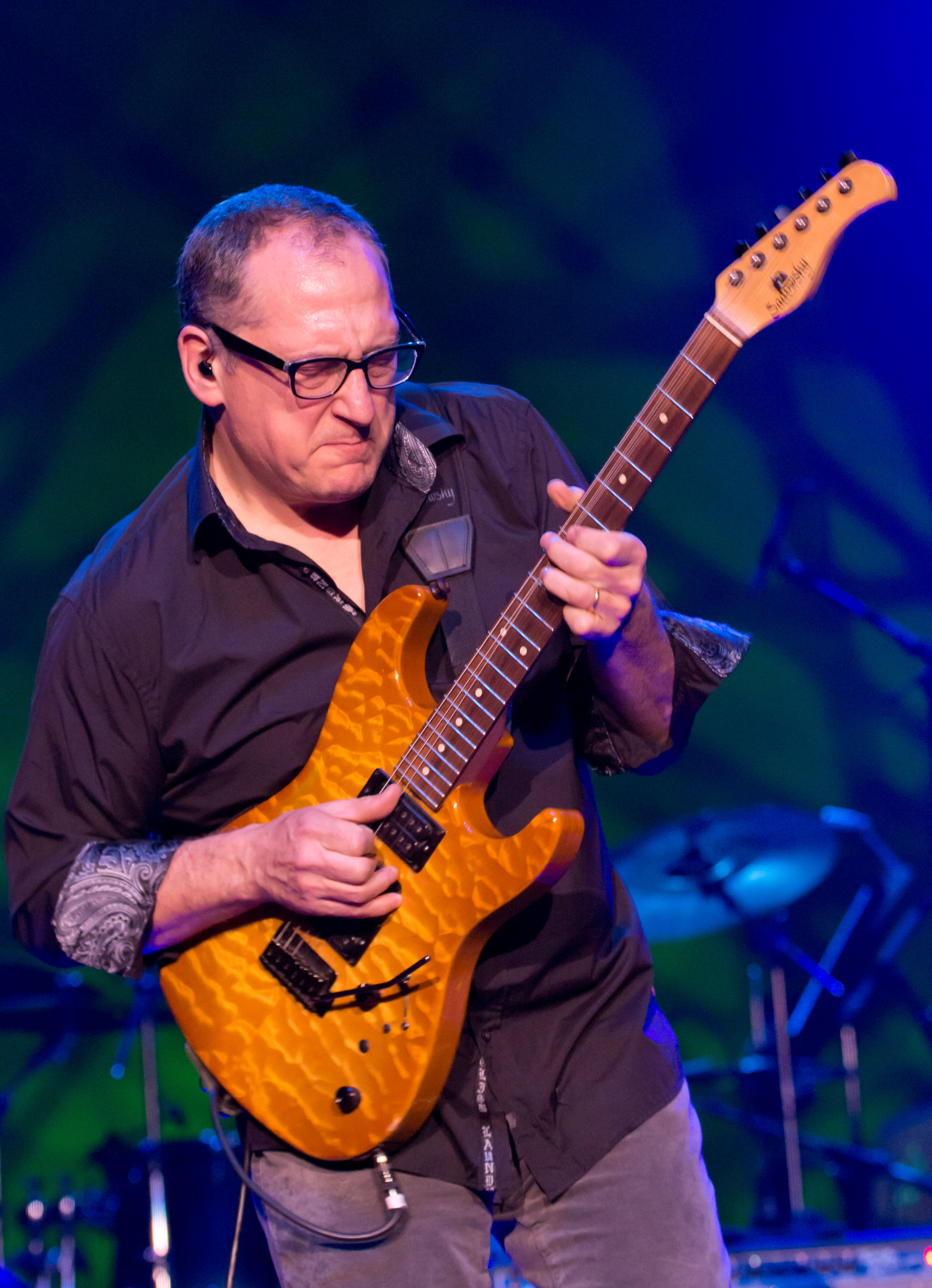
- Chuck Loeb

Background information
- Born: Charles Samuel Loeb; December 7, 1955; Nyack, New York, U.S.
- Died: July 31, 2017 (aged 61) Hastings on Hudson, New York, U.S.
- Genres: Jazz, jazz fusion, smooth jazz
- Occupations: Musician, composer, record producer, arranger
- Instrument: Guitar
- Years active: 1970s–2017
- Labels: Pony Canyon, DMP, Shanachie, Heads Up
- Formerly of: Steps Ahead; Metro; Fourplay

Charles Samuel "Chuck" Loeb (December 7, 1955 – July 31, 2017) was an American jazz guitarist and a member of the groups Steps Ahead, Metro and Fourplay.

== Early years and education ==
Loeb was born in Nyack, New York, near New York City. At a young age, he listened to Jimi Hendrix, Eric Clapton, Cream, Led Zeppelin, The Beatles, The Rolling Stones, and Bob Dylan. According to a 2005 JazzTimes article, the first song he learned on guitar was Dylan's "Like a Rolling Stone", which he would later play at a guest appearance with Dylan. He discovered jazz when he was sixteen through the music of guitarists Wes Montgomery, George Benson, John McLaughlin, and Pat Martino. At that point, Loeb chose to become a musician and "never thought of doing anything else".

He studied with local music teachers, then traveled to Philadelphia and became a student of jazz guitarist Dennis Sandole. In New York City, he learned from Jim Hall. For two years he attended Berklee College of Music in Boston, then left in 1976 to seek professional work in New York City.

== Groups ==
In New York, Loeb played with Chico Hamilton, Ray Barreto, and Hubert Laws. Starting in 1979, he was a member of Stan Getz's group. Getz later became the best man at his wedding to singer Carmen Cuesta. Loeb and Mitchel Forman, who was also in Getz's group, formed the jazz fusion band Metro (1994). In the 1980s, he was a member of the group Steps Ahead, which included Michael Brecker, someone Loeb credits as an influence. He replaced Larry Carlton as guitarist in Fourplay (2010).

Loeb and his wife recorded together, with Cuesta providing vocals on his albums and Loeb playing on Cuesta's albums, and their daughters Lizzy and Christina contributing vocals.

== Solo career ==
Loeb began a solo career in 1988 with his debut album My Shining Hour on the Japanese record label Pony Canyon. He released subsequent albums on DMP Digital Music Products among them Life Colors (1990). Loeb ultimately achieved commercial success with Shanachie Records on The Music Inside (1996). The title song from the album held the number one position on the jazz charts for six weeks. Later, he produced The Moon, the Stars, & the Setting Sun (1998), Listen (1999) In a Heartbeat (2001), and All There Is (2002).

Loeb's music has appeared on TV shows, commercials, and movie soundtracks, including The Untouchables, You've Got Mail, and Hitch.

His composition Logic of Love was nominated for a Grammy in 2015.

== Death ==
Loeb died of cancer on July 31, 2017, at the age of 61.

== Discography ==
=== Solo albums ===
- 1990: Magic Fingers
- 1990: Life Colors
- 1991: Balance
- 1993: Mediterranean
- 1994: Simple Things
- 1996: Memory Lane
- 1996: The Music Inside
- 1998: The Moon, The Stars And The Setting Sun
- 1999: Listen
- 2001: In A Heartbeat
- 2002: All There Is
- 2003: eBop
- 2005: When I'm With You
- 2005: The Love Song Collection
- 2007: Presence
- 2009: #1 Smooth Jazz Radio Hits!
- 2009: Between Two Worlds
- 2011: Plain 'n' Simple
- 2013: Silhouette
- 2016: Unspoken

=== With Metro ===
| # | year | title | label | notes |
|---|---|---|---|---|
| 1 | 1994 | Metro | Lipstick | |
| 2 | 1995 | Tree People | Lipstick | |
| 3 | 2000 | Metrocafe | Hip Bop/Koch | |
| 4 | 2002 | Grapevine | Hip Bop/Koch | |
| 5 | 2004 | Live At The A-Trane | Marsis Jazz | |
| 6 | 2007 | Express | Marsis Jazz | |
| 7 | 2015 | Big Band Boom | Jazzline | with WDR Big Band Cologne |

=== With the Fantasy Band ===
| # | year | title | label | notes |
|---|---|---|---|---|
| 1 | 1993 | The Fantasy Band | DMP | with George Jinda, Dave Samuels |
| 2 | 1994 | Sweet Dreams | DMP | with George Jinda, Dave Samuels |
| 3 | 1997 | The Kiss | Shanachie | |

=== With Fourplay ===
| # | year | title | label | notes |
|---|---|---|---|---|
| 1 | 2010 | Let's Touch the Sky | Heads up | with Bob James, Nathan East, Harvey Mason |
| 2 | 2012 | Esprit de Four | Heads up | |
| 3 | 2015 | Silver | Heads up | |

=== Compilations ===
| year | title | label | notes |
|---|---|---|---|
| 2004 | Jazz for Couch Potatoes! | Shanachie | by The Couch Potato All-Stars (Chuck Loeb with David Mann, Eric Alexander, Randy Brecker, Dave Samuels, Mike Ricchiuti, David Finck, Ron Jenkins, Mike Pope, Brian Dunne, David Charles) |
| 2007 | The Love Song Collection | Shanachie | compilation |
| 2009 | No. 1 Smooth Jazz Radio Hits | Shanachie | compilation |

=== Live albums ===
| year | title | label | notes |
|---|---|---|---|
| 2003 | Live 1994 | AA (Japan) | with Adam Holzman, Paul Wertico |

With Stan Getz

- Billy Highstreet Samba (EmArcy, 1981 [rel. 1990])
