= Savage Garden discography =

- Studio albums: 2
- Compilation albums: 3
- Singles: 14
- Video albums: 4

The discography of Savage Garden, an Australian duo made up of singer Darren Hayes and producer Daniel Jones, contains two studio albums, three compilation album, fourteen singles and four video albums. According to the duo's manager and reported by Billboard, the two studio albums released by the duo have sold 23 million copies worldwide.

== Albums ==
=== Studio albums ===
Title	Album details	Peak chart positions										Sales	Certifications (sales thresholds)
Title	Album details	AUS	AUT	CAN	FRA	GER	NZ	SWE	SWI	UK	US	Sales	Certifications (sales thresholds)
Savage Garden	Released: 24 March 1997 (Note: Savage Garden was re-issued with a bonus disc of remixes titled The Future of Earthly Delites in Australia in April 1998.); Label: Columbia (#4871612) Roadshow Music; Format: CD, cassette	1	10	2	7	14	1	1	8	2	3	AUS: 890,000	ARIA: 12× Platinum; BPI: 3× Platinum; BVMI: Gold; IFPI SWE: 2× Platinum; IFPI SWI: Platinum; MC: Diamond; RIAA: 7× Platinum; RMNZ: Platinum
Affirmation	Released: 1 November 1999 (Note: Affirmation was re-issued with a bonus live disc titled Declaration in Australia and the UK in 2000.); Label: Columbia (#4949352); Format: CD, cassette	1	26	1	45	11	3	1	8	7	6		ARIA: 8× Platinum; BPI: 3× Platinum; BVMI: Gold; IFPI SWE: 2× Platinum; MC: 2× Platinum; RIAA: 3× Platinum; RMNZ: 2× Platinum

=== Compilation albums ===
Title	Album details	Peak chart positions					Certifications
Title	Album details	AUS	JPN	NZ	SWE	UK	Certifications
Truly Madly Deeply – Ultra Rare Tracks	Released: 14 April 1998 (Japan only); Label: Sony; Format: CD	—	56	—	—	—	
Truly Madly Completely: The Best of Savage Garden	Released: 28 November 2005; Label: Columbia; Format: CD, digital download, DVD	11	58	15	31	25	ARIA: Platinum; BPI: Gold; RMNZ: Platinum
The Singles	Released: 12 June 2015; Label: JWM, Universal; Format: CD/DVD, digital download	15	47	—	—	193	BPI: Gold

=== Promotional albums ===
Title	Year	Details
The Future of Earthly Delites	1998	Released: 30 April 1998; Label: Columbia; Format: CD; Remix album, released as a bonus disc on Savage Garden
Ultra Hit Tracks	2000	Released: 2 January 2000 (Japan only); Label: Sony; Format: CD
Affirmation: The B-Sides	2000	Released: 23 March 2000 (Japan only); Label: Sony; Format: CD

== Singles ==
Title	Year	Peak chart positions										Certifications (sales thresholds)	Album
Title	Year	AUS	CAN	FRA	GER	IRL	ITA	NZ	SWE	UK	US	Certifications (sales thresholds)	Album
"I Want You" (Note: "I Want You" was re-released in the UK in 1998 as a remix titled "I Want You '98" and reached number twelve.)	1996	4	1	15	38	24	—	13	11	11	4	ARIA: Platinum; BPI: Silver; RIAA: Gold; RMNZ: Gold	Savage Garden
"To the Moon and Back"	1996	1	11	11	14	14	—	4	11	3	24	ARIA: Platinum; BPI: Platinum; RMNZ: Gold; SNEP: Gold	Savage Garden
"Truly Madly Deeply"	1997	1	1	9	11	2	1	12	2	4	1	ARIA: 2× Platinum; BPI: 3× Platinum; IFPI SWE: Platinum; RIAA: Gold; RMNZ: 2× Platinum; SNEP: Gold	Savage Garden
"Break Me Shake Me"	1997	7	23	—	86	—	—	8	39	—	—	ARIA: Gold	Savage Garden
"Universe"	1997	26	—	—	—	—	—	25	—	—	—		Savage Garden
"Santa Monica"	1998	—	—	—	—	—	—	—	—	—	—		Savage Garden
"The Animal Song"	1999	3	5	—	—	19	—	3	3	16	19	ARIA: Platinum; IFPI SWE: Gold	The Other Sister & Affirmation
"Tears of Pearls"	1999	—	—	—	—	—	—	—	32	—	—		Savage Garden
"I Knew I Loved You"	1999	4	1	43	34	18	12	3	3	10	1	ARIA: Platinum; BPI: Gold; IFPI SWE: Platinum; RIAA: Gold; RMNZ: Platinum	Affirmation
"Affirmation"	2000	16	36	—	64	23	—	29	26	8	—	ARIA: Gold; BPI: Silver	Affirmation
"Crash and Burn"	2000	16	12	—	69	41	—	19	28	14	24	ARIA: Gold	Affirmation
"Chained to You"	2000	21	—	—	—	—	—	—	—	—	—		Affirmation
"Hold Me"	2000	54	—	—	79	31	45	14	—	16	—		Affirmation
"The Best Thing"	2001	—	—	—	—	—	—	—	—	35	—		Affirmation
"—" denotes single that did not chart or was not released

=== Promotional singles ===
Title	Year	Album
"All Around Me"	1998	Savage Garden
"Last Christmas"	1999	Non-album single

== Music videos ==
Title	Year	Director(s)
"I Want You": (Original Australian version) (International version) ("I Want You '98")	1996–1998	Maurice Todman; Nigel Dick; Unknown (live video)
"To the Moon and Back": (Original Australian version) (International version) (1998 version) (Dance remix)	1996–1998	Catherine Caines & Chris Bentley; Nigel Dick; Adolfo Doring; Adolfo Doring
"Truly Madly Deeply": (Original Australian version) (International version)	1997–1998	Tony McGrath; Adolfo Doring
"Break Me Shake Me": (Original Australian version) (International version)	1997–1998	Adolfo Doring; Adolfo Doring
"Universe"	1997	Catherine Caines
"Santa Monica"	1998	Unknown (live video)
"Tears of Pearls"	1998	Adolfo Doring (live video)
"The Animal Song"	1999	Jim Gable
"I Knew I Loved You"	1999	Kevin Bray
"Crash and Burn"	2000	Yariv Gaber
"Affirmation": (Australian version) (International version)	2000	Unknown (historical clips); Unknown (live video)
"Chained to You"	2000	Unknown (live video)
"Hold Me"	2000	Alex Keshishian
"The Best Thing"	2001	Unknown (live video)

== Video albums ==
- The Video Collection (1998)

Includes five music videos: "I Want You", "To the Moon and Back", "Truly Madly Deeply", "Break Me Shake Me" and "Tears of Pearls".

- International Video Collection: The Story So Far (1999)

Includes eight music videos: "I Want You", "To the Moon and Back", "Truly Madly Deeply", "Break Me Shake Me", "Universe", "Santa Monica", "Tears of Pearls" and "To the Moon and Back" (Dance Remix). Also includes video clips and interview footage.

- Superstars and Cannonballs: Live and on Tour in Australia (2001)

Includes the "Parallel Lives" documentary, a ninety-minute concert from Brisbane, Australia, and three music videos: "I Knew I Loved You", "Crash and Burn" and "Affirmation". The DVD also includes commentary from the band and a discography section.

- Truly Madly Completely: The Videos (2005)

Includes seven music videos: "I Want You", "To the Moon and Back", "Truly Madly Deeply", "Break Me Shake Me", "I Knew I Loved You", "Crash and Burn" and "Hold Me", plus the "Parallel Lives" documentary.
