= List of awards and nominations received by Savage Garden =

Savage Garden awards and nominations
Awards and nominations
Award	Wins	Nominations
ARIA Awards	14	26
APRA Awards	10	19

Totals (Note: Certain award groups do not simply award one winner. They acknowledge several different recipients, have runners-up, and have third place. Since this is a specific recognition and is different from losing an award, runner-up mentions are considered wins in this award tally. For simplification and to avoid errors, each award in this list has been presumed to have had a prior nomination.)
- Wins: 30
- Nominations: 58

Savage Garden, an Australian pop music duo from 1994–2001, received numerous awards and nominations.

== Australian Record Industry Association (ARIA) Awards ==
These awards have been presented by the Australian Record Industry Association (ARIA) since 1987. Savage Garden has won 14 ARIA Awards from 26 nominations, including winning a record of ten in one year, 1997. Their success has been across categories, being successful twice each in the 'Highest Selling Album' and 'Best Pop Release' categories.

Year	Nominee / work	Award	Result
1996	"I Want You"	Breakthrough Artist – Single	Nominated
1997	"To the Moon and Back"	Best Video (dir. Tony McGrath)	Nominated
1997	"To the Moon and Back"	Best Pop Release	Won
1997	"To the Moon and Back"	Song of the Year	Won
1997	"Truly Madly Deeply"	Song of the Year	Nominated
1997	"Truly Madly Deeply"	Single of the Year	Won
1997	"Truly Madly Deeply"	Highest Selling Single	Won
1997	Savage Garden	Highest Selling Album	Nominated
1997	Savage Garden	Best Independent Release	Won
1997	Savage Garden	Breakthrough Artist - Album	Won
1997	Savage Garden	Producer of the Year (Note: The win is for Charles Fisher, who produced Savage Garden for Savage Garden, "Down on Me" for Hoodoo Gurus, Far Shore for The Seekers and "I Am Australian" for Judith Durham, Russell Hitchcock and Mandawuy Yunupingu.)	Won
1997	Savage Garden	Engineer of the Year (Note: The win is for Charles Fisher, who engineered Savage Garden for Savage Garden.)	Won
1997	Savage Garden	Album of the Year	Won
1997	Savage Garden	Best Group	Won
1998	Savage Garden	Highest Selling Album	Won
1998	"Universe"	Best Group	Nominated
1998	"Universe"	Producer of the Year (Note: The nomination is for Charles Fisher, who produced "Universe" for Savage Garden and "The Bush Girl" for The Seekers.)	Nominated
1998	Savage Garden	Outstanding Achievement Award	Won
1999	"The Animal Song"	Best Pop Release	Won
1999	"The Animal Song"	Highest Selling Single	Nominated
2000	Affirmation	Album of the Year	Nominated
2000	Affirmation	Best Group	Nominated
2000	Affirmation	Best Pop Release	Nominated
2000	Affirmation	Producer of the Year (Note: The nomination is for Darren Hayes, Daniel Jones, who produced Affirmation for Savage Garden.)	Nominated
2000	Affirmation	Highest Selling Album	Won
2001	Affirmation	Highest Selling Album	Nominated

== Australasian Performing Right Association (APRA) Awards ==
These awards were established by Australasian Performing Right Association (APRA) in 1982 to honour the achievements of songwriters and music composers, and to recognise their song writing skills, sales and airplay performance, by its members annually. Savage Garden has won 10 APRA Awards out of 19 nominations. Six of their wins were for 'Most Performed Australian Work Overseas'.

Year	Nominee / work	Award	Result
1998	"To the Moon and Back"	Song of the Year	Nominated
1998	"To the Moon and Back"	Most Performed Australian Work	Nominated
1998	"Truly Madly Deeply"	Song of the Year	Nominated
1998	"Truly Madly Deeply"	Most Performed Australian Work	Nominated
1998	Darren Hayes, Daniel Jones – Savage Garden	Songwriter of the Year	Won
1998	"I Want You"	Most Performed Australian Work Overseas	Won
1999	"Truly Madly Deeply"	Most Performed Australian Work Overseas	Won
2000	"Truly Madly Deeply"	Most Performed Australian Work Overseas	Won
2000	"I Knew I Loved You"	Song of the Year	Nominated
2000	"I Knew I Loved You"	Most Performed Australian Work	Nominated
2000	"The Animal Song"	Most Performed Australian Work	Won
2000	Darren Hayes, Daniel Jones – Savage Garden	Songwriter of the Year	Won
2001	"I Knew I Loved You"	Most Performed Australian Work Overseas	Won
2001	"Affirmation"	Most Performed Australian Work	Nominated
2001	"Crash and Burn"	Most Performed Australian Work	Nominated
2002	"Hold Me"	Most Performed Australian Work	Won
2002	"Crash and Burn"	Most Performed Australian Work Overseas	Won
2003	"I Knew I Loved You"	Most Performed Australian Work Overseas	Won
2005	"Truly Madly Deeply"	Most Performed Australian Work Overseas	Nominated

== ASCAP Pop Awards ==
Year	Nominee / work	Award	Result
2001	"I Knew I Loved You"	Song of the Year	Won
2002	"I Knew I Loved You"	Most Performed Song	Won

== BRMB Music Radio Awards ==
Year	Nominee / work	Award	Result
2000	Themselves	Best International Group	Won

== Billboard Music Awards ==
Year	Nominee / work	Award	Result
1998	Themselves	Top Artist	Nominated
1998	Themselves	Top Hot 100 Duo/Group	Nominated
1998	Themselves	Top Hot 100 Artist	Nominated
1998	"Truly Madly Deeply"	Top Hot 100 Song	Nominated

== Brit Awards ==
Year	Nominee / work	Award	Result
1999	Themselves	Best International Breakthrough Act	Nominated
2001	Themselves	Best International Group	Nominated

== Channel V Awards ==
Year	Nominee / work	Award	Result
1997	"I Want You"	Best International Debut Single	Won

== Denmark GAFFA Awards ==
Year	Nominee / work	Award	Result	Ref.
2001	Themselves	Best Foreign Live Act	Nominated	

== ECHO Awards ==
Year	Nominee / work	Award	Result	Ref.
1999	Themselves	Best International Newcomer	Nominated	

== IFPI Platinum Europe Awards ==
Year	Nominee / work	Award	Result
1998	Savage Garden	Album Title	Won

== Mo Awards ==
The Australian Entertainment Mo Awards (commonly known informally as the Mo Awards), were annual Australian entertainment industry awards. They recognise achievements in live entertainment in Australia from 1975 to 2016. Savage Garden won two awards in that time.

Year	Nominee / work	Award	Result (wins only)
1999	Tony Pantano	Australian Showbusiness Ambassador	Won
1999	Tony Pantano	Australian Performer of the Year	Won

== MTV Europe Music Awards ==
Year	Nominee / work	Award	Result
1998	"Truly Madly Deeply"	Best Song	Nominated

== Music Television Awards ==
Year	Nominee / work	Award	Result
1996	Themselves	Best Breakthrough	Nominated
1996	Themselves	Best Pop Act	Nominated
1997	Themselves	Best Pop Act	Nominated
1997	"To the Moon and Back"	Best Song	Nominated

== MTV Video Music Awards ==
Year	Nominee / work	Award	Result
1997	"To The Moon And Back"	Viewer's Choice (Australia)	Nominated

== Online Music Awards ==
Year	Nominee / work	Award	Result	Ref.
2000	The Celestial Savaged Garden	Best Fan Site	Nominated	
2000	Affirmation	Favorite Break-Up CD	Won	

== Teen Choice Awards ==
Year	Nominee / work	Award	Result
2000	Themselves	Choice Music: Pop Group	Nominated
2000	"I Knew I Loved You"	Choice Music: Love Song	Nominated

== World Music Awards ==
Year	Nominee / work	Award	Result
1998	Themselves	World's Best Selling Australian Artist	Won
2000	Themselves	World's Best Selling Australian Artist	Won
