= The Singles (Savage Garden album) =

Greatest hits album by Savage Garden
- Released: 12 June 2015
- Recorded: 1994–1999
- Genre: Pop; soft rock; pop rock
- Length: 68:35
- Label: JWM; Universal
- Producer: Walter Afanasieff; Charles Fisher; Darren Hayes; Daniel Jones; Oliver Jones; Chris Lord-Alge; Mike Pela

Savage Garden chronology
Truly Madly Completely: The Best of Savage Garden (2005)	The Singles (2015)

Alternative cover
- Japanese limited edition release

The Singles is the second greatest hits album of Savage Garden, released in Australia on 12 June 2015. Its release was to mark of the 20th anniversary of the band's signing to Roadshow Music in 1995, released through Universal who had acquired the band's catalogue due to the folding of Roadshow in 2013, and coincided with re-released expanded editions of their two studio albums Savage Garden and Affirmation. The compilation also contains a DVD featuring almost all of the band's music videos (only missing the second version of "To the Moon and Back" and the first version of "Affirmation").

A previously unreleased track, a demo from 1994 titled "She", was premiered and released on 15 May 2015 and also features on the album. A limited edition of the album was released in Japan on 25 May 2016, and features an image of Josuke Higashikata from JoJo's Bizarre Adventure: Diamond Is Unbreakable after the track "I Want You" was used as the ending theme of the anime adaptation.

== Track listing ==
All tracks are written by Darren Hayes and Daniel Jones.

The Singles – Disc 1 (CD)
No.	Title	Producer(s)	Length
1.	"I Want You"	Charles Fisher; Chris Lord-Alge	3:54
2.	"To the Moon and Back"	Fisher; Lord-Alge	5:44
3.	"Truly Madly Deeply"	Fisher; Mike Pela	4:39
4.	"Break Me Shake Me"	Fisher; Lord-Alge	3:25
5.	"Universe"	Fisher; Pela	4:22
6.	"All Around Me"	Fisher; Lord-Alge	4:14
7.	"Santa Monica"	Darren Hayes; Daniel Jones; Oliver Jones	3:36
8.	"Tears of Pearls"	Fisher; Pela	3:49
9.	"The Animal Song"	Walter Afanasieff	4:40
10.	"I Knew I Loved You"	Afanasieff	4:12
11.	"Crash and Burn"	Afanasieff	4:43
12.	"Affirmation"	Afanasieff	4:58
13.	"Chained to You"	Afanasieff	4:10
14.	"Hold Me"	Afanasieff	4:53
15.	"The Best Thing"	Afanasieff	4:21
16.	"She" (1994 demo)		2:55
Total length:			68:35

The Singles – Disc 2 (DVD)
No.	Title	Length
1.	"I Want You" (Australian version)
2.	"I Want You" (international version)
3.	"To the Moon and Back" (Australian version)
4.	"To the Moon and Back" (international version)
5.	"Truly Madly Deeply" (Australian version)
6.	"Truly Madly Deeply" (international version)
7.	"Break Me Shake Me" (Australian version)
8.	"Break Me Shake Me" (international version)
9.	"Universe" (international version)
10.	"Santa Monica" (international version)
11.	"Tears of Pearls" (international version)
12.	"The Animal Song" (international version)
13.	"I Knew I Loved You" (international version)
14.	"Crash and Burn" (international version)
15.	"Affirmation" (international version)
16.	"Chained to You" (international version)
17.	"Hold Me" (international version)

The Singles – Japanese limited edition bonus tracks
No.	Title	Length
17.	"I Want You" (acoustic live version)
18.	"I Knew I Loved You" (acoustic version)

== Charts ==
=== Weekly charts ===
Chart (2015)	Peak position
Australian Albums (ARIA)	15
Japanese Albums (Oricon)	47

== Certifications ==
Certifications for The Singles
Region	Certification	Certified units/sales
United Kingdom (BPI)	Gold	100,000^{‡}
^{‡} Sales+streaming figures based on certification alone.
