= APRA Music Awards of 2000 =

Annual Australian music awards

- Date: May 2000
- Location: Australia

The Australasian Performing Right Association Awards of 2000 (generally known as APRA Awards) are a series of awards held in May 2000. The APRA Music Awards were presented by APRA and the Australasian Mechanical Copyright Owners Society (AMCOS). Only one classical music award was available in 2000: Most Performed Contemporary Classical Composition. APRA provided awards for "Best Television Theme", and "Best Film Score" in 2000. APRA and AMCOS also sponsored the Australian Guild of Screen Composers (AGSC), which provided their own awards ceremony, from 1996 to 2000, with categories for film and TV composers.

== Awards ==
Nominees and winners with results indicated on the right.

=== APRA Music Awards ===
Song of the Year
Title	Artist	Writer	Result
"Cry Like a Baby"	Kasey Chambers	Kasey Chambers	Nominated
"Don't Call Me Baby"	Madison Avenue	Andrew Van Dorsselaer, Cheyne Coates, Duane Morrison	Nominated
"I Knew I Loved You"	Savage Garden	Darren Hayes, Daniel Jones	Nominated
"Passenger"	Powderfinger	Jon Coghill, John Collins, Ian Haug, Darren Middleton, Bernard Fanning	Won
"Weir"	Killing Heidi	Jesse Hooper, Ella Hooper	Nominated
Songwriters of the Year
Writer			Result
Darren Hayes, Daniel Jones			Won
Ted Albert Award for Outstanding Services to Australian Music
Name			Result
Triple J			Won
Most Performed Australian Work
Title	Artist	Writer	Result
"The Animal Song"	Savage Garden	Darren Hayes, Daniel Jones	Won
"Everywhere You Go"	Taxiride	Timothy Watson, Tim Wild	Nominated
"Get Set"	Taxiride	Tim Wild	Nominated
"I Knew I Loved You"	Savage Garden	Darren Hayes, Daniel Jones	Nominated
"Lucky Me"	Bachelor Girl	Leah Cooney, Jorgen Elofsson	Nominated
Most Performed Australian Work Overseas
Title	Artist	Writer	Result
"Truly Madly Deeply"	Savage Garden	Darren Hayes, Daniel Jones	Won
Most Performed Country Work
Title	Artist	Writer	Result
"Cry Like a Baby"	Kasey Chambers	Kasey Chambers	Nominated
"Dirt Track Cowboys"	Adam Brand	Adam Brand	Nominated
"These Uncertain Times"	Graeme Connors	Graeme Connors	Nominated
"They Don't Make 'Em Like That Anymore"	Troy Cassar-Daley	Garth Porter, Colin Buchanan, Troy Cassar-Daley	Nominated
"When I Ride"	Tania Kernaghan	Fiona Kernaghan, Garth Porter	Won
Most Performed Foreign Work
Title	Artist	Writer	Result
"Baby One More Time"	Britney Spears	Martin Sandberg	Nominated
"Kiss Me"	Sixpence None the Richer	Matthew Slocum	Nominated
"Lullaby"	Shawn Mullins	Shawn Mullins	Nominated
"That Don't Impress Me Much"	Shania Twain	Shania Twain, Robert "Mutt" Lange	Won
"You Get What You Give"	Иew Radicals	Gregg Alexander, Rick Nowels	Nominated
Most Performed Jazz Work
Title	Artist	Writer	Result
Barefoot	The Catholics	Lloyd Swanton	Nominated
Hanging Gardens	The Necks	Christopher Abrahams, Lloyd Swanton, Anthony Buck	Nominated
"Mandella"	Guy Strazzullo Quartet	Guy Strazzullo	Won
Most Performed Contemporary Classical Composition
Title	Composer	Performer	Result
Charm	Gerard Brophy	Marshall Maguire (harp), Patricia Pollett (viola), Geoffrey Collins (flute)	Won
Concerto for Violin and Viola	Richard Mills	Tasmanian Symphony Orchestra	Nominated
Harbour	Andrew Ford, Margaret Morgan	Australian Chamber Orchestra	Nominated
Best Film Score
Title		Composer	Result
Siam Sunset		Paul Grabowsky	Nominated
Soft Fruit		Antony Partos	Nominated
The Craic		Ricky Edwards	Nominated
Two Hands		Cezary Skubiszewski, Jan Skubiszewski	Won
Best Television Theme
Title		Composer	Result
The Adventures of Sam		Nerida Tyson-Chew	Nominated
Dog's Head Bay		Mark Rivett	Nominated
Secret Men's Business		Stephen Rae	Nominated
See How They Run		Mario Millo	Nominated
Thunderstone		Garry McDonald, Lawrence Stone	Won

== See also ==
- Music of Australia
