= APRA Music Awards of 1998 =

Annual Australian music awards

- Date: May 1998
- Location: Australia

The Australasian Performing Right Association Awards of 1998 (generally known as APRA Awards) are a series of awards held in May 1998. The APRA Music Awards were presented by Australasian Performing Right Association (APRA) and the Australasian Mechanical Copyright Owners Society (AMCOS). The awards resumed in 1998 after a hiatus in 1997.

Only one classical music award was available in 1998: Most Performed Contemporary Classical Composition. APRA provided awards for "Best Television Theme", and "Best Film Score" in 1998. APRA and AMCOS also sponsored the Australian Guild of Screen Composers (AGSC), which provided their own awards ceremony, from 1996 to 2000, with categories for film and TV composers.

== Awards ==
Nominees and winners with results indicated on the right.

=== APRA Music Awards ===
Song of the Year
Title	Artist	Writer	Result
"Even When I'm Sleeping"	Leonardo's Bride	Dean Manning	Won
"How to Make Gravy"	Paul Kelly	Paul Kelly	Nominated
"Into My Arms"	Nick Cave and the Bad Seeds	Nick Cave	Nominated
"No Aphrodisiac"	The Whitlams	Tim Freedman, Matt Ford, Glen Dormand	Nominated
"To the Moon and Back"	Savage Garden	Darren Hayes, Daniel Jones	Nominated
"Truly Madly Deeply"	Savage Garden	Darren Hayes, Daniel Jones	Nominated
Songwriters of the Year
Writer			Result
Darren Hayes, Daniel Jones			Won
Ted Albert Award for Outstanding Services to Australian Music
Name			Result
Michael Gudinski			Won
Most Performed Australian Work
Title	Artist	Writer	Result
"Break Me Shake Me"	Savage Garden	Darren Hayes, Daniel Jones	Nominated
"Even When I'm Sleeping"	Leonardo's Bride	Dean Manning	Won
"To the Moon and Back"	Savage Garden	Darren Hayes, Daniel Jones	Nominated
"Truly Madly Deeply"	Savage Garden	Darren Hayes, Daniel Jones	Nominated
"Whisper Your Name"	Human Nature	Andrew Tierney, Michael Tierney, Paul Begaud	Nominated
Most Performed Australian Work Overseas
Title	Artist	Writer	Result
"I Want You"	Savage Garden	Darren Hayes, Daniel Jones	Won
Most Performed Children's Work
Title	Artist	Writer	Result
"Bounce"	Flowerpot Gang	Phillip Barton	Nominated
"Honey"	Peter Combe	Peter Combe	Nominated
"It's Christmas"	Andy Armstrong	Andy Armstrong	Won
"Thingth I Thay"	Peter Combe	Peter Combe	Nominated
Most Performed Country Work
Title	Artist	Writer	Result
"Girls On the Avenue"	Clint Beattie	Richard Clapton	Nominated
"I Haven't Got a Heart"	Gina Jeffreys	Gina Hillenberg, Garth Porter, Rodney McCormack, David Bates	Won
"Little Things"	Troy Cassar-Daley	Troy Cassar-Daley, Steve Dorff	Nominated
"Road Less Travelled"	Graeme Connors	Graeme Connors	Nominated
"Wings of an Eagle"	Russell Morris and the Crosby Sisters	Russell Morris	Nominated
Most Performed Foreign Work
Title	Artist	Writer	Result
"Bitch"	Meredith Brooks	Shelly Peiken, Meredith Brooks	Won
"How Come, How Long"	Babyface	Stevie Wonder, Kenneth Edmonds	Nominated
"Semi-Charmed Life"	Third Eye Blind	Stephan Jenkins	Nominated
"Sunny Came Home"	Shawn Colvin	Shawn Colvin, John Leventhal	Nominated
"You Were Meant for Me"	Jewel	Jewel Kilcher, Steve Poltz	Nominated
Most Performed Jazz Work
Title	Artist	Writer	Result
"Baylorology"	Banana Oil	Andrew Baylor	Nominated
"My Family"	Banana Oil	Nicholas Caruana, Trevor Wraight, Chris Tabone	Won
"Neal Shuffle"	Banana Oil	Timothy Neal	Nominated
"New Craze"	The Black Sorrows	Joe Camilleri, Nicholas Smith, James Black	Nominated
"Sticky"	The Catholics	Lloyd Swanton	Nominated
Most Performed Contemporary Classical Composition
Title	Composer	Performer	Result
Essington	Peter Sculthorpe	Australian Chamber Orchestra	Nominated
Five Little Piano Pieces	Ross Edwards	Elizabeth Green	Nominated
Small Town	Peter Sculthorpe	Tasmanian Symphony Orchestra	Nominated
Songs from the Forest	Nigel Westlake	John Williams and Timothy Kain	Nominated
The Edge	Nigel Westlake	Edge Music	Won
Best Film Score
Title		Composer	Result
Shine		David Hirschfelder	Won
Best Television Theme
Title		Composer	Result
Wildside		Peter Best	Won

== See also ==
- Music of Australia
