= Break Me Shake Me =

1997 single by Savage Garden

Single by Savage Garden

from the album Savage Garden
- Released: 16 June 1997
- Genre: Hard rock; funk rock
- Length: 3:23
- Label: Roadshow Music
- Songwriters: Darren Hayes; Daniel Jones
- Producers: Savage Garden; Charles Fisher

Savage Garden singles chronology
"Truly Madly Deeply" (1997)	"Break Me Shake Me" (1997)	"Universe" (1997)

Music videos
- "Break Me Shake Me" on YouTube; "Break Me Shake Me" (International version) on YouTube

"Break Me Shake Me" is the fourth single released by Savage Garden from their eponymous debut album Savage Garden. "Break Me Shake Me" was released exclusively as a single in Australia in 1997 before being issued in Europe and Japan during the summer of 1998. The song was a hit in Australia, reaching number seven on the ARIA Singles Chart, and in New Zealand, where it peaked at number eight on the RIANZ Singles Chart. Two music videos exist for the song.

== Background ==
On 11 June 2015, prior to the release of The Singles compilation album, a video was posted on the band's Facebook page to explain the meaning behind the song's lyrics. The lyrics refer to actual arguments Darren Hayes had had with a close friend of his at school, as they debated their musical preferences: "She was a Madonna fan, I was a Michael Jackson fan." He further added that it is one of his favourite songs to play live, sometimes mashed up with Michael Jackson music to tribute him as the driving influence behind "Break Me Shake Me".

The version of "I'll Bet He Was Cool" that features on the Australian release is around twenty seconds shorter than the version that appears on most other releases. The "acoustic live" version of "I Want You" that features on the European release is the same version that appears on the Japanese Truly Madly Deeply – Ultra Rare Tracks CD. "Break Me Shake Me (Remix)" is the same as "Break Me Shake Me (Broken Mix)", which appears on The Future of Earthly Delites remix album.

The full title of the Japanese release is Break Me Shake Me + 4 Rare Tracks. "Santa Monica" was originally intended to be released before "Break Me Shake Me", and thus many online retailers made a listing for Santa Monica Remixes EP. However, "Santa Monica" was later released as a separate single. The version of "Tears of Pearls (Tears on the Dancefloor Mix)" is the original, uncorrected version which appeared on the first pressing of The Future of Earthly Delites remix album.

== Music videos ==
Two music videos were filmed for the song. The first video, which presents Darren Hayes with long hair, and was made for the Australian market, features the band performing the song in a small room, whilst the walls came closer and closer together. The second video, which presents Darren Hayes with short hair, and was made for the European market, features the band driving around in a car, performing in Bombo Headland Geological Site, NSW Australia and some concert footage from their Future of Earthly Delites tour. This video was directed by Adolfo Doring.

== Track listings ==
- Europe

Single CD

1. "Break Me Shake Me" – 3:23
2. "Break Me Shake Me" (live acoustic) – 3:26

Maxi CD

1. "Break Me Shake Me" – 3:23
2. "Break Me Shake Me" (live acoustic) – 3:26
3. "Break Me Shake Me" (Remix) – 4:18
4. "I Want You" (live acoustic) – 2:47
- Australia

Standard

1. "Break Me Shake Me" – 3:23
2. "I'll Bet He Was Cool" – 4:39
3. "Break Me Shake Me" (live acoustic) – 3:26

Limited edition

1. "Break Me Shake Me" – 3:23
2. "I'll Bet He Was Cool" – 4:39
3. "Break Me Shake Me" (live acoustic) – 3:26
4. "To the Moon and Back" (Hani's Num Radio Edit) – 3:58
5. "To the Moon and Back" (Hani's Num Dub) – 5:17
6. "To the Moon and Back" (Escape Into Hyperspace Mix) – 4:38
- Japan
1. "Break Me Shake Me" – 3:23
2. "Tears of Pearls" (Tears on the Dancefloor Mix) – 5:24
3. "Carry on Dancing" (Ultraviolet Mix) – 6:46
4. "To the Moon and Back" (acoustic) – 3:27
5. "Break Me Shake Me" (Broken Mix) – 4:18

== Charts ==
=== Weekly charts ===
Chart (1997–1998)	Peak position
Australia (ARIA)	7
Canada Top Singles (RPM)	23
Canada Adult Contemporary (RPM)	35
Germany (GfK)	86
Greece (IFPI)	5
Latvia (Latvijas Top 20)	13
New Zealand (Recorded Music NZ)	8
Spain (Top 40 Radio)	25
Sweden (Sverigetopplistan)	39

=== Year-end charts ===
Chart (1997)	Position
Australia (ARIA)	55

== Certifications ==
Region	Certification	Certified units/sales
Australia (ARIA)	Gold	35,000^{^}
^{^} Shipments figures based on certification alone.

== Release history ==
Region	Date
Australia	16 June 1997
Japan	5 August 1998
Europe	19 September 1998
