= All Around Me (disambiguation) =

"All Around Me" is a song by Flyleaf from their 2005 self-titled debut album. The phrase may also refer to:

- "All Around Me" (Savage Garden song), from their 1997 self-titled debut album
- "All Around Me", a song by Audio Adrenaline from Until My Heart Caves In, 2005
