= Santa Monica (Savage Garden song) =

Single by Savage Garden

from the album Savage Garden
- Released: 21 November 1998
- Length: 3:37
- Label: Sony Music Japan
- Songwriter(s): Darren Hayes; Daniel Jones
- Producer(s): Savage Garden; Charles Fisher

Savage Garden singles chronology
"Universe" (1998)	"Santa Monica" (1998)	"The Animal Song" (1999)

Audio video
- "Santa Monica" on YouTube

"Santa Monica" is a song by Australian pop duo Savage Garden, released exclusively as a single in Japan, and taken from their self-titled debut album.

== Background ==
The single was released on 7 December 1998, becoming the sixth overall single from the album. As an ode to the city of the same name in California, the song partly talks of Darren Hayes' experiences and observations.

The lyrics of the chorus also make reference to novelist Norman Mailer. The cover art for the single was also used for two other releases: the 1998 re release of "I Want You" in the United Kingdom, and the release of "Tears of Pearls" as a single in Europe in May 1999.

The live version of "Santa Monica" that appears on the single was recorded for an episode of the programme Hard Rock Live that originally aired in the United States on VH1 on 21 August 1998. The music video for the song was promoted alongside the single's release in Japan, which features footage from the Hard Rock Cafe performance of the song.

== Track listing ==
1. "Santa Monica" (album version) – 3:37
2. "Santa Monica" (Bittersweet Mix) – 5:00
3. "Santa Monica" (live at the Hard Rock Cafe) – 3:42
