= The Other Sister =

1999 film by Garry Marshall

- Theatrical release poster
- Directed by: Garry Marshall
- Screenplay by: Bob Brunner; Garry Marshall
- Story by: Bob Brunner; Garry Marshall; Alexandra Rose; Blair Richwood
- Produced by: Mario Iscovich; Alexandra Rose
- Starring: Juliette Lewis; Diane Keaton; Tom Skerritt; Giovanni Ribisi
- Cinematography: Dante Spinotti
- Edited by: Bruce Green
- Music by: Rachel Portman
- Production companies: Touchstone Pictures; Mandeville Films
- Distributed by: Buena Vista Pictures Distribution
- Release date: February 26, 1999
- Running time: 130 minutes
- Country: United States
- Language: English
- Budget: $35 million
- Box office: $27.8 million

The Other Sister is a 1999 American romantic comedy-drama film directed by Garry Marshall and stars Juliette Lewis, Giovanni Ribisi, Diane Keaton and Tom Skerritt. The film was written by Marshall and Bob Brunner. Malia Scotch Marmo did uncredited rewrites to the script.

== Plot ==
After receiving a well-earned certification from a sheltered boarding school, Carla Tate, an ambitious young woman with a mild intellectual disability, returns home to her overprotective and slightly snobby mother Elizabeth. Elizabeth seems to behave as if she is embarrassed about her youngest daughter's disability. During family discussions, Elizabeth adopts an uneasy attitude because her daughter was bullied as a child. Carla's father Radley is a dentist and recovering alcoholic. Carla's ambition is to seek more independence from her family by earning a diploma from a polytechnic school. When Carla meets Danny McMahon, another student who also has a developmental disability, they become friends and soon fall in love. Envying Danny's freedom, Carla convinces her parents she is capable of living on her own and moves into her own apartment. After a time, Carla and Danny become sexually active together.

Danny's independence is financially compromised when his wealthy and emotionally detached father abruptly stops sending subsistence money due to Danny flunking his classes. Danny begins to realize that the independence he enjoyed comes with a staggering cost. Danny gets drunk, then seeks solace and insight (and a joyride in a vintage Ford Mustang convertible) from his landlord and friend, Ernie.

During a Christmas party at the country club, nervous about his personal lot, Danny drinks too much to build up his courage to declare his love for Carla. He also tells everyone about their first time having sex. A humiliated Carla bursts into tears, screaming at everyone to stop laughing at her. Although Danny did not intend to embarrass Carla, she nonetheless refuses to see him anymore. Over time, Carla realizes she still loves Danny and wants to see him again despite her mother's advising her otherwise. At her older sister Caroline's wedding, Danny surprises Carla by showing up at the church and asks her to marry him, in a scene mimicking The Graduate, the couple's favorite film, to which she accepts.

Everyone supports their wishes except Elizabeth, who is unsure Danny can take care of himself, let alone Carla. Carla angrily tells her mother that she is sick of her combination of three behaviors: dominance, negativity and doubt. Also, Carla is sick of her mother constantly treating her like two things at once: an embarrassment and a handicap. Radley and her sisters, Heather and Caroline, support her decision, and the wedding is planned. At first, Elizabeth is determined not to attend, but Radley admonishes her. He said that he will walk Carla down the aisle. Finally, after realizing how selfish she has been behaving, Elizabeth relents. Outside the church, Danny surprises Carla with their school's marching band playing "76 Trombones" from The Music Man, and they are chauffeured away to their honeymoon in Ernie's prized Mustang.

== Cast ==
- Juliette Lewis as Carla Tate
  - Kendra Krull as Young Carla
- Diane Keaton as Elizabeth Tate
- Tom Skerritt as Dr. Radley Tate
- Giovanni Ribisi as Daniel "Danny" McMahon
- Poppy Montgomery as Caroline Tate
  - Brooke Garrett as Young Caroline
- Sarah Paulson as Heather Tate
  - Brighton McCloskey as Young Heather
- Linda Thorson as Drew Evanson
- Joe Flanigan as Jeff Reed
- Juliet Mills as Winnie the Housekeeper
- Harvey Miller as Dr. Johnson
- Hector Elizondo as Ernie
- Tracy Reiner as Michelle
- Giuseppe Andrews as Tough Guy Trevor
- Jim Meskimen as Carla's Minister
- Shannon Wilcox as Danny's Mom Ruthie
- Frank Campanella as Guest William
- Richard Stahl as Train Ticket Seller
- Shiri Appleby as Free Sample Girl

== Production ==
In January 1996, it was announced Garry Marshall would direct The Other Sister, the story of a "disabled teenager who moves into an apartment of her own and falls in love with a disabled classmate", for Disney. In August 1997, it was announced Diane Keaton would play Elizabeth Tate. The following month, it was reported that Juliette Lewis was cast as Carla Tate opposite Keaton.

== Soundtrack ==
The Other Sister

Soundtrack album by various artists
- Released: February 23, 1999
- Length: 46:41
- Label: Hollywood
- Producer: Kathy Nelson

Professional ratings
Review scores
Source	Rating
AllMusic	3/5 stars

The Other Sister: Music from the Motion Picture was released on February 23, 1999. The lead song for the soundtrack was "The Animal Song" by Savage Garden. The music video for the song featured scenes from the film. It peaked at #109 on the Billboard 200 albums chart.

=== Track listing ===
The Other Sister: Music from the Motion Picture track listing
No.	Title	Writer(s)	Performing artist	Length
1.	"The Animal Song"	Darren Hayes; Daniel Jones	Savage Garden	4:43
2.	"Loving You Is All I Know"	Diane Warren	The Pretenders	3:46
3.	"When You Say Nothing at All"	Paul Overstreet; Don Schlitz	Alison Krauss	4:24
4.	"Mrs. Robinson"	Paul Simon	The Lemonheads	3:47
5.	"She Comes 'Round"	Miles Zuniga	Fastball	3:30
6.	"Me"	Paula Cole	Paula Cole	5:04
7.	"I'm Free"	Mick Jagger; Keith Richards	The Soup Dragons	4:01
8.	"Follow If You Lead"	Milton Davis; Idina Menzel	Idina Menzel	4:07
9.	"At Last"	Mack Gordon; Harry Warren	Joan Osborne	3:07
10.	"Come Rain or Come Shine"	Harold Arlen; Johnny Mercer	Juliette Lewis	4:21
11.	"Carla & Danny's Theme"	Rachel Portman	Rachel Portman	5:51
Total length:				46:41

All track information and credits were taken from the CD liner notes.

== Release ==
=== Box office ===
The Other Sister opened at #3 at the North American box office making $6.6 million in its opening weekend behind Payback and 8mm, which opened at the top spot. It ultimately grossed $27.8 million in the United States and Canada, failing to recoup its $35 million budget, becoming a box office bomb.

=== Critical reception ===
The film received negative reviews from critics. On Rotten Tomatoes, the film maintains a 29% rating, based on 49 reviews, with an average rating of 4.7/10. The site's consensus: "Made-for-tv drama evokes anything but real emotion." Metacritic reports a 28 out of 100 rating, based on 21 critics, indicating "generally unfavorable reviews".

Roger Ebert rated the film at one out of four possible stars, and said the film was "shameless in its use of mental retardation as a gimmick, a prop and a plot device."

=== Accolades ===
Lewis was nominated for a Golden Raspberry Award for Worst Supporting Actress for her performance, where she lost to Denise Richards for The World Is Not Enough.
