= 1997 ARIA Music Awards =

Annual Australian music awards

- Date: 22 September 1997
- Venue: Capitol Theatre, Sydney, New South Wales
- Hosted by: Paul McDermott

Highlights
- Most wins: Savage Garden (10)
- Most nominations: Savage Garden (13)
- Website: ariaawards.com.au

Television/radio coverage
- Network: Network Ten

The 11th Annual Australian Recording Industry Association Music Awards (generally known as the ARIA Music Awards) were held on 22 September 1997 at the Capitol Theatre in Sydney. The event was hosted by Australian actor–comedian Paul McDermott, with presenters Elle McFeast, Kylie Minogue, Ben Folds, Colin Buchanan, the Presidents of the United States of America and others. Savage Garden dominated this year, receiving a record ten awards including Album of the Year for Savage Garden, Single of the Year for "Truly Madly Deeply", Best Group and seven other trophies.

In addition to the annually presented awards, a Special Achievement Award was given to Charles Fisher and an Outstanding Achievement Award was received by Peter André. The ARIA Hall of Fame inducted: the Bee Gees, Graeme Bell and Paul Kelly.

== Ceremony details ==
The event included musical performances by Ben Folds Five, the Presidents of the United States of America and Kylie Minogue. John Farnham teamed up with crooner quartet Human Nature to debut the performance of their single, "Every Time You Cry", which later became a number-three ARIA Singles Chart hit. Crowded House, who won Highest Selling Album for their greatest hits compilation, Recurring Dream, reunited the year after breaking up. They commemorated Paul Kelly's induction into the ARIA Hall of Fame by performing his song "Leaps and Bounds".

Various international and Australian entertainers presented awards to the winners including Australian Elle McFeast (who was nominated for Best Comedy Release), Ben Folds, Kylie Minogue and Chris Ballew, Dave Dederer and Jason Finn of the Presidents of the United States of America. Four Artisan Awards were presented prior to the telecast.

=== Presenters and performers ===
The ARIA Awards ceremony was hosted by Australian comedian and TV presenter Paul McDermott. Presenters and performers were:

Presenter(s)	Performer(s)	Ref.
Merril Bainbridge	silverchair	
Rani	silverchair	
Monica Trapaga	silverchair	
Michael Gudinski	Savage Garden	
Tottie Goldsmith	Savage Garden	
Gina Jeffreys	Savage Garden	
Paul Grabowsky	Tina Arena	
Dylan Lewis	Tina Arena	
Alle Brunning	Tina Arena	
Ben Folds	John Farnham, Human Nature – "Every Time You Cry"	
John McRae	John Farnham, Human Nature – "Every Time You Cry"	
the Presidents of the United States of America	John Farnham, Human Nature – "Every Time You Cry"	
Bill Gates	Leonardo's Bride	
Colin Buchanan	Leonardo's Bride	
Mark Seymour	Leonardo's Bride	
Richard Wilkins	The Superjesus	
Billy Birmingham	The Superjesus	
Wendy Matthews	The Superjesus	
the Nissan Cedrics	Neil Finn, Christine Anu	
Dave Graney	Neil Finn, Christine Anu	
Deborah Conway	Neil Finn, Christine Anu	
"Ugly" Phil O'Neil	Renée Geyer, Paul Kelly, Vika and Linda	
Mikey Robins	Renée Geyer, Paul Kelly, Vika and Linda	
Bob Downe	Renée Geyer, Paul Kelly, Vika and Linda	
Elle McFeast	Crowded House – "Leaps and Bounds"	
Paul Hester, Nick Seymour, Neil Finn, Jabba	Crowded House – "Leaps and Bounds"	
Kylie Minogue, Peter Garrett	Crowded House – "Leaps and Bounds"	

== Multiple winners and nominees ==
- Savage Garden – 10 awards from 13 nominations
- Charles Fisher – 3 awards from 3 nominations
- Paul Kelly – 2 awards from 5 nominations (including Hall of Fame)
- The Superjesus – 2 awards from 2 nominations
- Spiderbait – 1 award from 7 nominations
- Silverchair – 1 award from 6 nominations
- Crowded House – 1 award from 3 nominations
- Powderfinger – 7 nominations

== Awards ==
Nominees and winners with results indicated on the right.

=== ARIA Awards ===
Album of the Year
Artist		Album	Result
Savage Garden		Savage Garden	Won
Silverchair		Freak Show	Nominated
Nick Cave and the Bad Seeds		The Boatman's Call	Nominated
Powderfinger		Double Allergic	Nominated
Spiderbait		Ivy and the Big Apples	Nominated
Single of the Year
Artist		Single	Result
Savage Garden		"Truly Madly Deeply"	Won
Leonardo's Bride		"Even When I'm Sleeping"	Nominated
Nick Cave and the Bad Seeds		"Into My Arms"	Nominated
Powderfinger		"D.A.F."	Nominated
Spiderbait		"Buy Me a Pony"	Nominated
Song of the Year
Artist		Song	Result
Savage Garden		"To the Moon and Back"	Won
Nick Cave and the Bad Seeds		"Into My Arms"	Nominated
Paul Kelly		"How to Make Gravy"	Nominated
Powderfinger		"D.A.F."	Nominated
Savage Garden		"Truly Madly Deeply"	Nominated
Highest Selling Album
Artist		Album	Result
Crowded House		Recurring Dream	Won
Jimmy Barnes		Barnes Hits Anthology	Nominated
John Farnham		Romeo's Heart	Nominated
Powderfinger		Double Allergic	Nominated
Savage Garden		Savage Garden	Nominated
Highest Selling Single
Artist		Single	Result
Savage Garden		"Truly Madly Deeply"	Won
Human Nature		"Don't Say Goodbye"	Nominated
Human Nature		"Wishes"	Nominated
Silverchair		"Abuse Me"	Nominated
Silverchair		"Freak"	Nominated
Best Group
Artist		Release	Result
Savage Garden		Savage Garden	Won
Crowded House		"Instinct"	Nominated
Powderfinger		Double Allergic	Nominated
Silverchair		Freak Show	Nominated
Spiderbait		Ivy and the Big Apples	Nominated
Best Female Artist
Artist		Release	Result
Monique Brumby		"Mary"	Won
Deni Hines		"I'm Not in Love"	Nominated
Nikka Costa		"Get off My Sunshine"	Nominated
Wendy Matthews		"Then I Walked Away"	Nominated
Annie Crummer		Seventh Wave	Nominated
Best Male Artist
Artist		Release	Result
Paul Kelly		"How to Make Gravy"	Won
Dave Graney		"The Devil Drives"	Nominated
Jimmy Barnes		"Lover Lover"	Nominated
Mark Seymour		"Last Ditch Cabaret"	Nominated
Tex Perkins		"Far Be It from Me"	Nominated
Best New Talent
Artist		Release	Result
The Superjesus		"Eight Step Rail"	Won
Fini Scad		"Coppertone" / "Testrider"	Nominated
Frank Bennett		Five O'Clock Shadow	Nominated
Jebediah		"Jerks of Attention"	Nominated
Rani		"Always on My Mind"	Nominated
Breakthrough Artist – Album
Artist		Album	Result
Savage Garden		Savage Garden	Won
The Earthmen		Love Walked In	Nominated
Human Nature		Telling Everybody	Nominated
Leonardo's Bride		Angel Blood	Nominated
Rebecca's Empire		Way of All Things	Nominated
Breakthrough Artist – Single
Artist		Single	Result
The Superjesus		"Shut My Eyes" / "Eight Step Rail"	Won
Fini Scad		"Coppertone" / "Testrider"	Nominated
Frank Bennett		"Creep"	Nominated
Gina G		"(Ooh Aah) Just a Little Bit"	Nominated
Mark Seymour		"Last Ditch Cabaret"	Nominated
Best Pop Release
Artist		Release	Result
Savage Garden		"To the Moon and Back"	Won
Deni Hines		"I'm Not in Love"	Nominated
Human Nature		Telling Everybody	Nominated
Rani		"Always on My Mind"	Nominated
Snout		New Pop Dialogue	Nominated
Best Dance Release
Artist		Release	Result
Pendulum		"Coma"	Won
Boo Boo and Mace		"Flowers in the Sky"	Nominated
The Lord's Garden		Journeys	Nominated
Our House		Floorspace	Nominated
Wicked Beat Sound System		Music from the Core	Nominated
Best Country Album
Artist		Album	Result
Graeme Connors		The Road Less Travelled	Won
The Dead Ringer Band		Living in the Circle	Nominated
The Ranch		The Ranch	Nominated
Tina Martyn		Lying in My Bed	Nominated
Troy Cassar-Daley		True Believers	Nominated
Best Independent Release
Artist		Release	Result
Savage Garden		Savage Garden	Won
Deadstar		"Don't it Get You Down"	Nominated
Dirty Three		Horse Stories	Nominated
Ed Kuepper		Frontierland	Nominated
Even		Less Is More	Nominated
Best Alternative Release
Artist		Release	Result
Spiderbait		Ivy and the Big Apples	Won
Dirty Three		Horse Stories	Nominated
Nick Cave and the Bad Seeds		The Boatman's Call	Nominated
The Fauves		Future Spa	Nominated
Powderfinger		Double Allergic	Nominated
Best Indigenous Release
Artist		Release	Result
Archie Roach		"Hold On Tight"	Won
George Telek		Telek	Nominated
Tiddas		Tiddas	Nominated
Warumpi Band		Stompin' Ground	Nominated
Yothu Yindi		Birrkuta - Wild Honey	Nominated
Best Adult Contemporary Album
Artist		Album	Result
My Friend The Chocolate Cake		Good Luck	Won
Annie Crummer		Seventh Wave	Nominated
Tommy Emmanuel		Can't Get Enough	Nominated
Ed Kuepper		Starstruck	Nominated
Vika and Linda		Princess Tabu	Nominated
Best Comedy Release
Artist		Release	Result
Martin/Molloy		Poop Chute	Won
Bob Downe		Jazzy!	Nominated
Elle McFeast		Breasts	Nominated
Ian Turpie		Talk of the Town	Nominated
John Clarke & Bryan Dawe		Secret Men's Business	Nominated
=== Fine Arts Awards ===
Best Jazz Album
Artist		Album	Result
Bernie McGann		Playground	Won
The Catholics		Life on Earth	Nominated
Clarion Fracture Zone		Less Stable Elements	Nominated
Col Nolan		Nolans Groove	Nominated
Ian Chaplin Quartet		Tjapangati	Nominated
Scott Tinkler		Dance of Delulian	Nominated
Best Classical Album
Artist		Album	Result
Adelaide Symphony Orchestra, David Porcelijn		Peter Sculthorpe: Sun Music	Won
Tasmanian Symphony Orchestra, David Porcelijn		Peter Sculthorpe: The Fifth Continent	Nominated
Tamara Cislowska		The Enchanted Isle	Nominated
Renaissance Players		Mirror of Light	Nominated
Australian Chamber Orchestra		Il Tramonto - The Sunset	Nominated
Best Children's Album
Artist		Album	Result
Play School		In The Car	Won
Mic Conway		What's That Sound?	Nominated
Franciscus Henri		Hello, Mister Whiskers	Nominated
The Hooley Dooleys		Splash	Nominated
Monica Trapaga		Monica's House	Nominated
Best Original Soundtrack / Cast / Show Recording
Artist		Release	Result
Blixa Bargeld, Nick Cave, Mick Harvey		To Have and to Hold	Won
Mario Millo		GP	Nominated
Various		Idiot Box	Nominated
Various		Love and Other Catastrophes	Nominated
Various		What I Have Written	Nominated
Best World Music Album
Artist		Album	Result
George Telek		Telek	Won
Ashok Roy		The Night Ragas	Nominated
The Barkers		The Black Joke	Nominated
Equa		Equa	Nominated
Mara! & Martenitsa Choir		Sezoni	Nominated
=== Artisan Awards ===
Producer of the Year
Producer	Musical artist	Release	Result
Charles Fisher	Hoodoo Gurus	"Down on Me"	Won
Charles Fisher	Judith Durham, Russell Hitchcock & Mandawuy Yunupingu	"I Am Australian"	Won
Charles Fisher	Savage Garden	Savage Garden	Won
Charles Fisher	The Seekers	Far Shore	Won
David Bridie	Monique Brumby	Mary	Nominated
Nick Launay	Silverchair	Freak Show	Nominated
Paul Begaud	Human Nature	Telling Everybody	Nominated
Tim Whitten	Fini Scad	Furious	Nominated
Tim Whitten	Powderfinger	Double Allergic	Nominated
Engineer of the Year
Engineer	Musical artist	Release	Result
Charles Fisher	Savage Garden	Savage Garden	Won
David Bridie	John Farnham	Hearts on Fire	Nominated
Charles Dickie	The Black Sorrows	"Chained to the Wheel", "Chosen Ones", "New Craze"	Nominated
Charles Dickie	Paul Kelly	"Tease Me"	Nominated
Phil McKellar	Spiderbait	Ivy and the Big Apples	Nominated
Phil McKellar	You Am I	"Good Mornin' Tuesday"	Nominated
Best Video
Director	Musical artist	Single	Result
Tony Mahony	Dave Graney & the Coral Snakes	"Feelin' Kinda Sporty"	Won
Greg Harrington, Ross Fraser	John Farnham	"All Kinds of People"	Nominated
Janet English	Spiderbait	"Calypso"	Nominated
Jeff Darling	Crowded House	"Not the Girl You Think You Are"	Nominated
Mark Hartley	You Am I	"Good Mornin'"	Nominated
Tony McGrath	Savage Garden	"To the Moon and Back"	Nominated
Best Cover Art
Cover artist	Musical artist	Album	Result
John Watson, John O'Donnell, Kevin Wilkins, Silverchair	Silverchair	Freak Show	Won
Janet English	Spiderbait	Ivy and the Big Apples	Nominated
Pierre Baroni	Paul Kelly	Songs from the South	Nominated
Simon Anderson, Dean Manning	Leonardo's Bride	Angel Blood	Nominated
Tony Mahony	Dave Graney & the Coral Snakes	The Devil Drives	Nominated

== Achievement awards ==
=== Outstanding Achievement Award ===
- Peter Andre

=== Special Achievement Award ===
- Charles Fisher

== Hall of Fame Inductees ==
The ARIA Hall of Fame inductees were:

- The Bee Gees
- Graeme Bell
- Paul Kelly

For Kelly's induction, Crowded House had reformed to provide a cover version of his "Leaps and Bounds". In 2019 Double J's Dan Condon described this as one of the "7 great performances from the history of the ARIA Awards."

== See also ==
- Music of Australia
