= All Around Me (Savage Garden song) =

Song by Savage Garden

from the album Savage Garden
- B-side: "I Want You" (live acoustic); "To the Moon and Back" (live acoustic)
- Released: 20 March 1998
- Recorded: 1996–1998
- Genre: Pop
- Length: 4:16
- Label: Roadshow Music
- Songwriters: Darren Hayes, Daniel Jones
- Producer: Mike Pela

Music video
- "All Around Me" on YouTube

"All Around Me" is a promotional single by Australian pop music duo Savage Garden from their 1997 self-titled debut album. The song was left off the international edition of their debut album, but was later included as the B-side to "The Animal Song".

== Background ==
Intended as a prize for contest winners of a competition held by Austereo, the promotional release of "All Around Me" began on March 20, 1998. The contest, which involved fans answering questions on Savage Garden, began in February 1998 and continued until April 1998. Each prize winner received a three-track CD containing "All Around Me" plus two unreleased acoustic recordings made by Lee Novak in Los Angeles in 1997. Copies of the single were also given away free to fans at Savage Garden's second live concert in Brisbane. The single was never commercially available, and thus is very rare. There are approximately 3,000 copies in existence.

The front cover of the single does not contain the title "All Around Me", but instead reads "The Future of Earthly Delites", the concert by the duo being promoted at that time. This title was also used for the bonus remix album that was included with the Australian re-issue of Savage Garden's first album. The single, however, is titled "All Around Me", as that is the first track on the CD and the song which was released for airplay. Due to being a promotional release, it was ineligible to chart, and no music video was made for the song.

== Track listing ==
1. "All Around Me" – 4:16
2. "I Want You" (live acoustic, L.A, 1997) – 2:46
3. "To the Moon and Back" (live acoustic, L.A, 1997) – 3:26
