= List of Billboard Mainstream Top 40 number-one songs of 2000 =

This is a list of the U.S. Billboard magazine Mainstream Top 40 number-one songs of 2000.

During 2000, a total of 14 singles hit number one on the chart, with 'N Sync's "Bye Bye Bye" being the longest-running number-one single of the year, leading the chart for ten weeks.

== Chart history ==
The best-performing song of 2000, "Everything You Want" by Vertical Horizon, never reached #1 on the weekly charts.

Issue date	Song	Artist(s)	Reference
January 1	"Smooth"	Santana featuring Rob Thomas	
January 8	"I Knew I Loved You"	Savage Garden	
January 15	"I Knew I Loved You"	Savage Garden	
January 22	"I Knew I Loved You"	Savage Garden	
January 29	"I Knew I Loved You"	Savage Garden	
February 5	"I Knew I Loved You"	Savage Garden	
February 12	"What a Girl Wants"	Christina Aguilera	
February 19	"What a Girl Wants"	Christina Aguilera	
February 26	"Show Me The Meaning of Being Lonely"	Backstreet Boys	
March 4	"Bye Bye Bye"	NSYNC	
March 11	"Bye Bye Bye"	NSYNC	
March 18	"Bye Bye Bye"	NSYNC	
March 25	"Bye Bye Bye"	NSYNC	
April 1	"Bye Bye Bye"	NSYNC	
April 8	"Bye Bye Bye"	NSYNC	
April 15	"Bye Bye Bye"	NSYNC	
April 22	"Bye Bye Bye"	NSYNC	
April 29	"Bye Bye Bye"	NSYNC	
May 6	"Bye Bye Bye"	NSYNC	
May 13	"I Try"	Macy Gray	
May 20	"I Try"	Macy Gray	
May 27	"I Try"	Macy Gray	
June 3	"I Try"	Macy Gray	
June 10	"Oops!... I Did It Again"	Britney Spears	
June 17	"Oops!... I Did It Again"	Britney Spears	
June 24	"Oops!... I Did It Again"	Britney Spears	
July 1	"It's Gonna Be Me"	NSYNC	
July 8	"It's Gonna Be Me"	NSYNC	
July 15	"It's Gonna Be Me"	NSYNC	
July 22	"It's Gonna Be Me"	NSYNC	
July 29	"It's Gonna Be Me"	NSYNC	
August 5	"Bent"	Matchbox 20	
August 12	"Absolutely (Story of a Girl)"	Nine Days	
August 19	"Bent"	Matchbox 20	
August 26	"Bent"	Matchbox 20	
September 2	"Jumpin' Jumpin'"	Destiny's Child	
September 9	"Jumpin' Jumpin'"	Destiny's Child	
September 16	"Jumpin' Jumpin'"	Destiny's Child	
September 23	"Jumpin' Jumpin'"	Destiny's Child	
September 30	"Kryptonite"	3 Doors Down	
October 7	"Kryptonite"	3 Doors Down	
October 14	"Kryptonite"	3 Doors Down	
October 21	"Kryptonite"	3 Doors Down	
October 28	"With Arms Wide Open"	Creed	
November 4	"Kryptonite"	3 Doors Down	
November 11	"With Arms Wide Open"	Creed	
November 18	"With Arms Wide Open"	Creed	
November 25	"With Arms Wide Open"	Creed	
December 2	"With Arms Wide Open"	Creed	
December 9	"Independent Women Part I"	Destiny's Child	
December 16	"Independent Women Part I"	Destiny's Child	
December 23	"Independent Women Part I"	Destiny's Child	
December 30	"Independent Women Part I"	Destiny's Child	

== See also ==
- 2000 in music
