= Fini Scad =

Australian alternative rock band, 1990s

- Origin: Australia
- Genres: Indie rock
- Members: Dave Thomas; Bill Coupland; Lincoln Beecroft; John McPhee

Fini Scad were an Australian alternative rock band of the 1990s. They had a minor hit with their single "Coppertone", which reached No. 42 in the 1996 Triple J Hottest 100. At the ARIA Music Awards of 1997, the band were nominated for two awards. They released one album, Wider Screen in 1998, and disbanded later the same year.

== Members ==
- Dave Thomas – vocals, rhythm guitar
- Bill Coupland – lead guitar
- Lincoln Beecroft – bass guitar
- John (Jono) McPhee – drums

== Discography ==
=== Albums ===
List of albums, with selected details
Title	Album details	Peak chart positions
Title	Album details	AUS
Wider Screen	Released: September 1998; Label: Mushroom Records (Mush33154.2); Format: CD	77

=== Extended plays ===
List of EP, with selected details
Title	Album details	Peak chart positions
Title	Album details	AUS
Testrider	Released: October 1996; Label: Bark (GRRR123), Mushroom (D13028); Format: CD	119

=== Singles ===
List of singles, with selected chart positions
Title	Year	Peak chart positions	Album
Title	Year	AUS	Album
"Coppertone"	1996	(Note: "Coppertone" was released as a radio only single, which was ineligible to chart in 1996)	Testrider
"Furious"	1997	205	Wider Screen
"It's Not Real"	1998	141	Wider Screen
"Sonic Boy"	1998	-	Wider Screen

== Awards and nominations ==
=== ARIA Music Awards ===
The ARIA Music Awards is an annual awards ceremony that recognises excellence, innovation, and achievement across all genres of Australian music. They commenced in 1987.

Year	Nominee / work	Award	Result	Ref.
1997	"Coppertone" / "Testrider"	Best New Talent	Nominated	
1997	"Coppertone" / "Testrider"	Breakthrough Artist – Single	Nominated	
1997	Tim Whitten for Furious	Producer of the Year	Nominated	
