= Truly Madly Deeply – Ultra Rare Tracks =

Compilation album by Savage Garden
- Released: 14 April 1998
- Recorded: 1995–1998
- Genre: Pop, rock
- Length: 43:08
- Label: Sony
- Producer: J.W.M. Productions Australia

Savage Garden chronology
Savage Garden (1997)	Truly Madly Deeply – Ultra Rare Tracks (1998)	Affirmation (1999)

Truly Madly Deeply – Ultra Rare Tracks is a compilation album released by Australian pop duo Savage Garden on 14 April 1998, exclusively in Japan.

== Background ==
As none of Savage Garden's first three singles were issued in Japan, Sony made the decision to instead release all of the remixes and B-sides included on the singles as a compilation album. Despite "Mine" being a B-side to "I Want You", it was not included on the compilation as it was made available as a bonus track on the Japanese version of the group's self-titled debut album. The album was later made widely available in the United Kingdom through HMV and Virgin, who sold copies of the album as imports in their UK stores. The song "All Around Me", although not released as a B-side, originally appeared on the Australian release of Savage Garden, but was removed when the album was released internationally, and thus, is included here as it had never previously been released in Japan. It later became available as the B-side to "The Animal Song"

== Track listing ==
1. "All Around Me" (B-Side of "To The Moon & Back") – 4:11
2. "Truly Madly Deeply" (Album Version) – 4:38
3. "Fire Inside the Man" (B-Side of "I Want You") – 4:24
4. "I'll Bet He Was Cool" (B-Side of "Break Me Shake Me")– 4:58
5. "I Want You" (Xenomania Funky Mix) – 4:34
6. "Love Can Move You" (B-Side of "Universe") – 4:47
7. "This Side of Me" (B-Side of "Universe") – 4:11
8. "Memories Are Designed to Fade" (B-Side of "To The Moon & Back") – 3:51
9. "To the Moon and Back" (Hani's Num Radio Edit) – 3:57
10. "Santa Monica" (Bittersweet Mix) – 5:00
11. "Break Me Shake Me" (Live Acoustic) – 4:18
12. "I Want You" (Live Acoustic) – 2:47
13. "Truly Madly Deeply" (Dub Mix) – 4:37
14. "Truly Madly Deeply" (Australian Version) – 4:37
