= Tears of Pearls =

Single by Savage Garden

from the album Savage Garden
- B-side: "Love Can Move You"
- Released: 11 May 1999
- Genre: Pop
- Length: 3:47
- Label: Columbia
- Songwriter(s): Darren Hayes; Daniel Jones
- Producer(s): Savage Garden; Charles Fisher

Savage Garden singles chronology
"The Animal Song" (1999)	"Tears of Pearls" (1999)	"I Knew I Loved You" (1999)

Audio video
- "Tears of Pearls" on YouTube

"Tears of Pearls" is a song by Savage Garden, released as the seventh and final single taken from their eponymous self-titled debut album. The song was later included on the remix disc of The Future of Earthly Delites, as the Tears on the Dancefloor Mix. There are two distinct versions of this mix; the original, and a version included on later pressings of the album, containing more reverb on the vocals.

== Background ==
The single was available exclusively in selected areas of Europe. The music video for "Tears of Pearls" features tour footage from the group's Future of Earthly Delites tour. It was directed by Adolfo Doring. The music video features on the group's home video release, The Video Collection, and in edited form on the VHS release of The Story So Far.

The cover art for the single was also used for the 1998 re-release of "I Want You" in the United Kingdom, and the release of "Santa Monica" as a single in Japan.

In the song's chorus, the titular pearls are revealed to be "mixed emotions" that humans keep locked away like stolen jewels, concealed from the rest of the world. From time to time those emotions and feelings burst out in the open, creating "tears of pearls".

In the words of Daniel Jones, "Tears of Pearls" was a track he composed "because Darren wanted me to write it". The creative process was unusual, consisting of Hayes requesting various changes from Jones to build up the song he had in mind. Hayes described it as a "hipster-retroist" tribute to the new wave acts of the 1980s, citing Duran Duran and George Michael as key inspirations. He clarified that "Tears of Pearls" was meant to be a "theatrical" number that he thought would be great to open Savage Garden's live shows and tours.

== Track listing ==
CD single

1. "Tears of Pearls" – 3:48
2. "Love Can Move You" – 4:45

Maxi CD

1. "Tears of Pearls" – 3:48
2. "Santa Monica" (Live at the Hard Rock Cafe) – 3:41
3. "Love Can Move You" – 4:45

== Charts ==
=== Weekly charts ===
Chart (1999)	Peak position
Latvia (Latvijas Top 20)	14
Netherlands (Dutch Top 40 Tipparade)	16
Netherlands (Single Top 100)	87
Sweden (Sverigetopplistan)	32

=== Year-end charts ===
Chart (1999)	Position
Romania (Romanian Top 100)	71
