= Australian Rock Database =

Website about rock music in Australia

- Available in: English
- Owner: Australian Rock Database
- Creator: Magnus Holmgren
- Website: http://www.ozrockdb.com/
- Commercial: No
- Registration: No
- Launched: 2000
- Current status: Archived

The Australian Rock Database was a website with a searchable online database that listed details of Australian rock music artists, albums, bands, producers and record labels. It was established in 2000 by Swedish national Magnus Holmgren, who had developed an interest in Australian music when visiting as an exchange student. Information for the database entries was initially gleaned from Chris Spencer, Zbig Nowara and Paul McHenry's Who's Who of Australian Rock (3rd ed, 1993) and Ian McFarlane's Encyclopedia of Australian Rock and Pop (1999). The Australian Government's former website on Culture and Recreation listed Australian Rock Database as a resource for Australian rock music.
