= Universe (Savage Garden song) =

Single by Savage Garden

from the album Savage Garden
- B-side: "Love Can Move You"; "This Side of Me"
- Released: 20 October 1997
- Genre: Pop
- Length: 4:21
- Label: Roadshow Music
- Songwriters: Darren Hayes; Daniel Jones
- Producer: Mike Pela

Savage Garden singles chronology
"Break Me Shake Me" (1997)	"Universe" (1997)	"Santa Monica" (1998)

Audio video
- "Universe" on YouTube

"Universe" is the fifth single taken from Australian pop duo Savage Garden's self titled debut album, released in Australia on 20 October 1997. The version of B-side "This Side of Me" that appears on the single release is roughly twenty seconds shorter than other released versions. This is the version that was originally intended for release.

== Background ==
"Universe" was released as a single on 20 October 1997, exclusively in Australia, as at the time, "To the Moon and Back" had only just been released in Europe, the United Kingdom and the United States.

It was the last official single to be released from the album in Australia, and was the most added song to radio stations on the week of release. The song also charted at number 25 on the New Zealand Singles Chart. It also peaked at number 26 in the group's home country.

== Music video ==
The music video depicts the duo in an oriental themed setting, with various women and couples dancing together, and taking photos of the women on Polaroids. In some shots, Darren is seen at a long table with them, simply singing to the camera, and also performing the song on a stage. The video did not see a commercial release until it was released on the DVD component of The Singles compilation, released in June 2015.

== Track listing ==
1. "Universe" – 4:21
2. "Love Can Move You" – 4:47
3. "This Side of Me" (short version) – 3:51
4. "Universe" (Future of Earthly Delites Mix) – 4:38

== Charts ==
Chart (1997–1998)	Peak position
Australia (ARIA)	26
New Zealand (Recorded Music NZ)	25
