= I Knew I Loved You =

1999 single by Savage Garden

Single by Savage Garden

from the album Affirmation
- B-side: "Mine (And You Could Be)"; "Universe"
- Released: 20 September 1999
- Length: 4:10
- Label: Roadshow; Columbia
- Songwriters: Daniel Jones; Darren Hayes
- Producers: Daniel Jones; Darren Hayes; Walter Afanasieff

Savage Garden singles chronology
| "Tears of Pearls" (1999) | "I Knew I Loved You" (1999) | "Affirmation" (2000) |

Music video
- "I Knew I Loved You" on YouTube

"I Knew I Loved You" is a song by Australian pop duo Savage Garden, released through Roadshow Music and Columbia Records as the second single from their second and final studio album, Affirmation (1999). The song was created as an attempt to replicate the composition of Savage Garden's previous single "Truly Madly Deeply". The track was serviced to US adult contemporary and top 40 radio in September 1999 and was issued commercially in Australia on 28 September 1999.

Upon its release, "I Knew I Loved You" topped the US Billboard Hot 100 chart for four weeks in early 2000 and topped the Billboard Adult Contemporary chart for 17 weeks, becoming that listing's most successful track of the 2000s decade. The song also reached number one in Canada and Romania and entered the top 10 in Australia, New Zealand, and four European countries. The music video features then teen actress Kirsten Dunst as Darren Hayes' love interest. The music video received heavy rotation on MTV.

== Background ==
Having finished recording material for Affirmation, Savage Garden members Darren Hayes and Daniel Jones were challenged by Columbia Records executive Don Ienner to produce the next "Truly Madly Deeply". The duo argued that "Truly Madly Deeply" was a one-of-its-kind song and could not be replicated but also realised that their second album lacked a love ballad. Hayes and Jones went on to compose "I Knew I Loved You" and submitted it to the record label's executives, who were delighted with the result as they felt it was a strong contender to eclipse the success of "Truly Madly Deeply".

Singer Darren Hayes further explained that the song was born out of a paradoxical situation, being a love song written "in about 40 minutes out of spite towards the record company" at a time when he felt "wounded by love".

== Critical reception ==
Bill Lamb from About.com noted "I Knew I Loved You" as a "romantic ballad". AllMusic editor Stephen Thomas Erlewine called it "hooky and memorable". Larry Flick from Billboard described the song "as cool and crisp as the autumn air, this simple, direct ballad projects a sweet message of knowing love when you see it." He noted that the song "glides along amid a soft, easy beat, with vocalist Hayes sounding more at ease and confident than ever, like he's singing a timeless classic." He also added that "drenched harmonies add to the overall impact" and called it "absolutely enchanting, one of the most beautiful songs yet of 1999". Bob Waliszewski of Plugged In said that it "describes how it feels to be hopelessly in love".

== Commercial performance ==
The song was a success on the US Billboard Hot 100, where it spent four weeks at the top, becoming Savage Garden's third and final top-10 hit. It was the last song by an Australian artist to reach the top of the Billboard Hot 100 for over 12 years, until Gotye peaked at number one with his single "Somebody That I Used to Know" in 2012. The song remained on the Billboard Adult Contemporary chart for 124 weeks, breaking the record for 123 weeks set by another of the duo's songs, "Truly Madly Deeply". It ranked number 21 on the all-time Adult Contemporary Chart. The song was certified platinum by the Recording Industry Association of America (RIAA).

== Music video ==
The accompanying music video for "I Knew I Loved You" was filmed by director Kevin Bray in August 1999 on a New York City Subway set that had previously been used on the sitcom Seinfeld. It features Hayes playing out a romantic plot on a subway train, with a female passenger (played by American actress Kirsten Dunst) as the object of his affections.

At one point, the train comes to a stop due to a power outage; red emergency lighting comes on and everyone in the carriage joins hands. Hayes, who is sitting opposite his aforementioned love interest, extends his hand to her. As they touch, the video cuts to a montage of the couple walking through a park, bathed in sunlight, laughing and holding hands. The video then cuts back to the carriage as the power comes back on and the train pulls into the station. Hayes and the woman exit with the other passengers, and share a fleeting glance before going their separate ways. Shots of the band performing alone on the subway platform and in the carriage are interspersed throughout the video.

== Track listings ==
- Australian CD single and US 7-inch single
1. "I Knew I Loved You" – 4:10
2. "I Knew I Loved You" (acoustic version) – 4:08
- US CD and cassette single
1. "I Knew I Loved You" (album version) – 4:10
2. "I Knew I Loved You" (7-inch Mini-Me Remix) – 4:17
- UK CD1
1. "I Knew I Loved You" – 4:10
2. "I Knew I Loved You" (acoustic version) – 4:10
3. "Mine (And You Could Be)" – 4:29
- UK CD2
1. "I Knew I Loved You" (radio edit) – 3:45
2. "I Knew I Loved You" (club mix) – 8:26
3. "Universe" – 4:20

* The club mix is misprinted as 3:45 on the liner notes.

- UK cassette single
1. "I Knew I Loved You" (radio edit) – 3:45
2. "I Knew I Loved You" (acoustic version) – 3:45
- European CD1
1. "I Knew I Loved You" – 4:10
2. "I Knew I Loved You" (radio version) – 3:45
- European CD2
1. "I Knew I Loved You" – 4:10
2. "I Knew I Loved You" (extended instrumental version) – 5:05
3. "I Knew I Loved You" (Daniel's Remix) – 4:19
4. "Mine (And You Could Be)" – 4:29

* The extended instrumental version is misprinted as the acoustic version on the liner notes.

- Japanese CD single
1. "I Knew I Loved You" (album version) – 4:11
2. "I Knew I Loved You" (radio version) – 3:49
3. "I Knew I Loved You" (acoustic version) – 4:08

== Charts ==
=== Weekly charts ===
Weekly chart performance for "I Knew I Loved You"
| Chart (1999–2000) | Peak position |
|---|---|
| Australia (ARIA) | 4 |
| Austria (Ö3 Austria Top 40) | 36 |
| Belgium (Ultratip Bubbling Under Flanders) | 9 |
| Canada Top Singles (RPM) | 1 |
| Canada Adult Contemporary (RPM) | 1 |
| Canada CHR (Nielsen BDS) | 2 |
| Czech Republic (IFPI) | 5 |
| Denmark (IFPI) | 13 |
| Estonia (Eesti Top 20) | 8 |
| Europe (Eurochart Hot 100) | 18 |
| Finland (Suomen virallinen lista) | 18 |
| France (SNEP) | 43 |
| Germany (GfK) | 34 |
| Iceland (Íslenski listinn Topp 40) | 15 |
| Ireland (IRMA) | 18 |
| Italy (FIMI) | 12 |
| Italy (Musica e dischi) | 13 |
| Latvia (Latvijas Top 20) | 4 |
| Netherlands (Dutch Top 40 Tipparade) | 8 |
| Netherlands (Single Top 100) | 54 |
| New Zealand (Recorded Music NZ) | 3 |
| Norway (VG-lista) | 7 |
| Romania (Romanian Top 100) | 1 |
| Scottish Singles Sales (Official Charts) | 22 |
| Sweden (Sverigetopplistan) | 3 |
| Switzerland (Schweizer Hitparade) | 34 |
| UK Singles (Official Charts) | 10 |
| UK Airplay (Music Week) | 16 |
| US Billboard Hot 100 | 1 |
| US Adult Contemporary (Billboard) | 1 |
| US Adult Pop Airplay (Billboard) | 3 |
| US Pop Airplay (Billboard) | 1 |
| US Rhythmic Airplay (Billboard) | 10 |

=== Year-end chart ===
1999 year-end chart performance for "I Knew I Loved You"
| Chart (1999) | Position |
|---|---|
| Australia (ARIA) | 27 |
| Canada Top Singles (RPM) | 56 |
| Canada Adult Contemporary (RPM) | 54 |
| Italy (Musica e dischi) | 99 |
| New Zealand (RIANZ) | 10 |
| Sweden (Hitlistan) | 25 |
| UK Singles (OCC) | 176 |
| US Adult Top 40 (Billboard) | 89 |
| US Mainstream Top 40 (Billboard) | 93 |

2000 year-end chart performance for "I Knew I Loved You"
| Chart (2000) | Position |
|---|---|
| Brazil (Crowley) | 13 |
| Romania (Romanian Top 100) | 56 |
| US Billboard Hot 100 | 7 |
| US Adult Contemporary (Billboard) | 1 |
| US Adult Top 40 (Billboard) | 14 |
| US Mainstream Top 40 (Billboard) | 7 |
| US Rhythmic Top 40 (Billboard) | 36 |

2001 year-end chart performance for "I Knew I Loved You"
| Chart (2001) | Position |
|---|---|
| US Adult Contemporary (Billboard) | 9 |

2002 year-end chart performance for "I Knew I Loved You"
| Chart (2002) | Position |
|---|---|
| US Adult Contemporary (Billboard) | 47 |

=== Decade-end charts ===
Decade-end chart performance for "I Knew I Loved You"
| Chart (2000–2009) | Position |
|---|---|
| US Billboard Hot 100 | 54 |
| US Adult Contemporary (Billboard) | 1 |

=== All-time charts ===
All-time chart performance for "I Knew I Loved You"
| Chart (1961–2011) | Position |
|---|---|
| US Adult Contemporary (Billboard) | 21 |

== Certifications ==
Certifications for "I Knew I Loved You"
| Region | Certification | Certified units/sales |
|---|---|---|
| Australia (ARIA) | Platinum | 70,000^{^} |
| Denmark (IFPI Danmark) | Gold | 45,000^{‡} |
| New Zealand (RMNZ) | Platinum | 30,000^{‡} |
| Sweden (GLF) | Platinum | 30,000^{^} |
| United Kingdom (BPI) | Gold | 400,000^{‡} |
| United States (RIAA) | Gold | 500,000^{^} |
^{^} Shipments figures based on certification alone.^{‡} Sales+streaming figures based on certification alone.

== Release history ==
Release dates and formats for "I Knew I Loved You"
| Region | Date | Format(s) | Label(s) | Ref(s). |
|---|---|---|---|---|
| United States | 20 September 1999 | Adult contemporary; hot adult contemporary; modern adult contemporary radio | Columbia | |
| United States | 21 September 1999 | Contemporary hit radio | Columbia | |
| Australia | 28 September 1999 | CD | Roadshow | |
| Japan | 22 October 1999 | CD | SME | |
| United Kingdom | 1 November 1999 | CD; cassette | Columbia | |
| United States | 4 January 2000 | CD; cassette | Columbia | |

== Cover versions ==
- Country singer Daryle Singletary covered the song for his 2000 album, Now and Again. His version reached number 55 on the Billboard Hot Country Singles & Tracks chart in October 2000.

== See also ==
- Love at first sight
- List of Romanian Top 100 number ones of the 2000s
- List of number-one singles of 2000 (Canada)
- List of Billboard Hot 100 number-one singles of 2000
- List of Billboard Adult Contemporary number ones of 1999 and 2000 (U.S.)
- List of Billboard Mainstream Top 40 number-one songs of 2000
