= Truly Madly Deeply (song) =

1997 single by Savage Garden

- International artwork

Single by Savage Garden

from the album Savage Garden
- B-side: "I'll Bet He Was Cool"; "I Want You"; "Promises"; "This Side of Me"; "Love Can Move You"
- Released: 3 March 1997
- Genre: Pop
- Length: 4:37
- Label: Roadshow Music; Warner Music
- Songwriters: Darren Hayes; Daniel Jones
- Producer: Charles Fisher

Savage Garden singles chronology
"To the Moon and Back" (1996)	"Truly Madly Deeply" (1997)	"Break Me Shake Me" (1997)

Music videos
- "Truly Madly Deeply" on YouTube; "Truly Madly Deeply" (International version) on YouTube

"Truly Madly Deeply" is a song by Australian pop duo Savage Garden, released in March 1997 as the third single from their self-titled debut album (1997) by Roadshow and Warner Music. It won the 1997 ARIA Music Award for both Single of the Year and Highest Selling Single and was nominated for Song of the Year. Written by bandmates Darren Hayes and Daniel Jones, the song is a reworking of a song called "Magical Kisses" that the pair wrote together during the recording of their debut album.

The song reached No. 1 in Australia, Canada, and the United States; in the latter country, Billboard ranked it the most successful song of all time on their Adult Contemporary chart. Two music videos were filmed for the track: one for its original Australian release and another for the international market, shot in Paris, France. In November 2019, the song was added to the National Film and Sound Archive's selection of recordings. The songs added to the list provide a snapshot of Australian life and have "cultural, historical, and aesthetic significance and relevance".

== Background and composition ==
Having got their breakthrough with the single "I Want You", Darren Hayes and Daniel Jones were sent to Sydney for eight months to record material for a debut album. For Hayes, it was his first time in life being away from his family and his native Brisbane. The longing for his family and his then-wife pushed him towards writing a song that would express those feelings. The sheet music for "Truly Madly Deeply" indicates the key of C major with a tempo of 83 bpm.

== Versions ==
The international version of "Truly Madly Deeply".

There are two versions of the song. The first was made available on the Australian version of the group's album, whereas the second version appears on the release of the album in Europe and America. This version was composed in 1997 and features a drum machine track instead of the more acoustic-sounding music featured on the Australian version. The European version also features on the group's greatest hits compilation, "Truly Madly Completely" and "The Singles".

== Critical reception ==
Larry Flick from Billboard magazine wrote that "this is the single that should help affirm that Savage Garden is more than a one-hit wonder." He described the song as a "percussive ballad" and complimented it for revealing "vocal skills and charisma not previously displayed." He noted further that "with its romantic lyrics and plush, guitar-etched instrumentation, this song 'truly madly deeply' deserves as much airplay as the top 40 programmers can heap upon it." Insider described it as "a truly sweet song, written out of homesickness; this love ballad has total staying power and is still played over 20 years later." Pan-European magazine Music & Media stated, "This Australian duo possesses a fine knack for writing excellent mainstream pop with top flight radio appeal." They added, "This track [...] is no exception—as proven by its recent two-week stay at the top of Billboard's Hot 100 Singles chart." A reviewer from Music Week gave "Truly Madly Deeply" three out of five, remarking that the song had been successful in both Australia and the US, while the UK "is a little less keen. But this luscious pop ballad should attract airplay and sales." In 2018, Stacker placed the song at No. 21 on their list of the "Best pop songs of the last 25 years," noting it as "a quintessential '90s pop song". In 2019, they ranked it No. 9 on their list of the "Best 90s pop songs."

== Chart performance ==
The song became the duo's second No. 1 in their native Australia, after "To the Moon and Back". The song also reached No. 1 in Canada and No. 2 in Norway, Sweden, Austria and Ireland, as well as the top 10 in France, Switzerland, the Netherlands, Belgium and the UK. In 1998, the song was certified gold in France, for sales of 200,000 copies. In May 2001 the Australasian Performing Right Association (APRA), as part of its 75th Anniversary celebrations, named "Truly Madly Deeply" as one of the Top 30 Australian songs of all time.

In the United States, the song entered the Billboard Hot 100 singles chart at No. 26 on 6 December 1997, It peaked at No. 1 for two weeks in January 1998 and lingered for a full year on the chart. It became the first song in the chart's history to spend its first 52 weeks inside the top 30. The song spent half a year in the top 10. It reached No. 2 on the Adult Top 40 chart and entered the top 10 on the Rhythmic Top 40 chart. On the Billboard Mainstream Top 40 chart, the song reached No. 1 for one week on 31 January before dropping to No. 2 as Celine Dion assumed the top spot with the theme to the hit film Titanic, "My Heart Will Go On". Savage Garden's single held at No. 2 for 10 weeks before returning to No. 1 on the week of 18 April.

The song eventually set a record for the most weeks of any single in history on the US Hot Adult Contemporary chart. In 1998, the song logged 11 weeks at No. 1 on this chart, but its full chart span lasted 123 weeks. That record would stand for just under two years, when another of the group's ballads spent its 124th week on the chart. The song was "I Knew I Loved You", from the album Affirmation. The song was so popular that it re-entered Billboard's Hot Singles Sales chart in March 2002 and—four and a half years after its release—again became a U.S. Top 30 bestseller, remaining on that chart until late July 2002. The original version logged its final week on the Hot Adult Contemporary Recurrents chart on 17 June 2006. This makes it the No. 1 Billboard Adult Contemporary song of all time. In 2008, the song was listed at No. 30 on Billboard's Hot 100 All-Time Top Songs.

== Music video ==
Two music videos were made for the song. The original Australian video, which presents Hayes with long hair, features the band in a white room with several other people. Hayes is on a red sofa singing the song while Daniel performs on the piano. It was directed by Tony McGrath. The video used for the European market, which presents Hayes with short hair, was filmed in Paris, France. It was directed by Adolfo Doring. The video depicts the story of two lovers, a young man and a lady, who have been separated by circumstances. The woman arrives in Paris at Gare de l'Est station, in search of her lover, who is also waiting for her. He is wandering in various places within the Montmartre area, including the Soleil de la Butte restaurant. In between the scenes involving the two lovers, Hayes can be seen walking around Paris, in locations such as the Place de la Concorde and the Jardin des Tuileries. He is singing, thereby acting as a narrator to the story involving the two lovers. Towards the end of the video, Hayes enters a small concert hall where Daniel Jones is playing guitar. Shortly afterwards, the young lady manages to find her lover, right in the centre of Paris, at the feet of the Tour Saint-Jacques. They are both filled with emotion on seeing each other again. The video ends with Hayes and Jones coming out of the concert hall, and coming across the two lovers who are rejoicing in their reunion.

== Track listings ==
=== Australia ===
- CD single
1. "Truly Madly Deeply"
2. "Promises"
3. "Truly Madly Deeply" (night radio mix)
- Maxi-CD single
1. "Truly Madly Deeply"
2. "Promises"
3. "Truly Madly Deeply" (night radio mix)
4. "I Want You" (Bastone club mix)
5. "I Want You" (I Need I Want mix)

=== Europe ===
- CD1
1. "Truly Madly Deeply" – 4:37
2. "I'll Bet He Was Cool" – 4:58
- CD2
1. "Truly Madly Deeply" – 4:38
2. "Truly Madly Deeply" (Australian version) – 4:38
3. "Truly Madly Deeply" (night radio mix) – 4:35
4. "This Side of Me" – 4:09
5. "Love Can Move You" – 4:47

=== United Kingdom ===
- CD1
1. "Truly Madly Deeply" (album version) – 4:38
2. "Truly Madly Deeply" (Australian version) – 4:38
3. "This Side of Me" – 4:09
4. "Love Can Move You" – 4:47
- CD2
1. "Truly Madly Deeply" (album version) – 4:38
2. "Truly Madly Deeply" (night radio mix) – 4:35
3. "I Want You" (album version) – 3:52
4. "I'll Bet He Was Cool" – 3:58
- Cassette
1. "Truly Madly Deeply" (album version) – 4:38
2. "I Want You" (album version) – 3:52

=== United States ===
- CD, 7-inch, and cassette single
1. "Truly Madly Deeply" – 4:37
2. "I'll Bet He Was Cool" – 4:58

== Credits and personnel ==
Credits are adapted from the Savage Garden album booklet.

Studios

- Mixed at Whitfield Street Studios (London, England)
- Mastered at Sony Music Studios (New York City)

Personnel

- Darren Hayes – writing, lead vocals, background vocals, vocal arrangement
- Daniel Jones – writing, additional vocals, additional guitars, keyboards, sequencing
- Rex Goh – guitar
- Alex Hewitson – bass
- Terepai Richmond – drums, percussion
- Charles Fisher – production, vocal arrangement
- Jim Bonnefond – vocal arrangement
- Mike Pela – mixing
- Vlado Meller – mastering

== Charts ==
=== Weekly charts ===
Chart (1997–1998)	Peak position
Australia (ARIA)	1
Austria (Ö3 Austria Top 40)	2
Belgium (Ultratop 50 Flanders)	4
Belgium (Ultratop 50 Wallonia)	5
Canada Top Singles (RPM)	1
Canada Adult Contemporary (RPM)	1
Croatia (HRT)	2
Estonia (Eesti Top 20)	3
Europe (Eurochart Hot 100)	3
Europe (European Hit Radio)	1
Finland (Suomen virallinen lista)	13
France (SNEP)	9
Germany (GfK)	11
Greece (IFPI)	9
Guatemala (El Siglo de Torreón)	4
Iceland (Íslenski Listinn Topp 40)	8
Ireland (IRMA)	2
Italy (FIMI)	1
Italy (Musica e dischi)	4
Italy Airplay (Music & Media)	2
Latvia (Latvijas Top 20)	3
Netherlands (Dutch Top 40)	6
Netherlands (Single Top 100)	8
New Zealand (Recorded Music NZ)	12
Norway (VG-lista)	2
Poland Airplay (Music & Media)	2
Scottish Singles Sales (Official Charts)	5
Spain (Top 40 Radio)	27
Sweden (Sverigetopplistan)	2
Switzerland (Schweizer Hitparade)	7
UK Singles (Official Charts)	4
UK Airplay (Music Week)	3
US Billboard Hot 100	1
US Adult Contemporary (Billboard)	1
US Adult Pop Airplay (Billboard)	2
US Pop Airplay (Billboard)	1
US Rhythmic Airplay (Billboard)	10

Chart (2024)	Peak position
Estonia Airplay (TopHit)	79

=== Year-end charts ===
Chart (1997)	Position
Australia (ARIA)	7

Chart (1998)	Position
Austria (Ö3 Austria Top 40)	13
Belgium (Ultratop 50 Flanders)	21
Belgium (Ultratop 50 Wallonia)	40
Brazil (Crowley)	6
Canada Top Singles (RPM)	6
Canada Adult Contemporary (RPM)	40
Europe (Eurochart Hot 100)	12
Europe (European Hit Radio)	2
France (SNEP)	21
Germany (Media Control)	37
Netherlands (Dutch Top 40)	41
Netherlands (Single Top 100)	56
Sweden (Hitlistan)	9
Switzerland (Schweizer Hitparade)	33
UK Singles (OCC)	10
UK Airplay (Music Week)	5
US Billboard Hot 100	4
US Adult Contemporary (Billboard)	1
US Adult Top 40 (Billboard)	5
US Mainstream Top 40 (Billboard)	3
US Rhythmic Top 40 (Billboard)	25

Chart (1999)	Position
US Adult Contemporary (Billboard)	5

Chart (2000)	Position
US Adult Contemporary (Billboard)	25

=== Decade-end charts ===
Chart (1990–1999)	Position
Austria (Ö3 Austria Top 40)	50
US Billboard Hot 100	63

=== All-time charts ===
Chart	Position
US Billboard Hot 100	39
US Adult Contemporary (Billboard)	1

== Certifications and sales ==
Region	Certification	Certified units/sales
Australia (ARIA)	2× Platinum	140,000^{^}
Austria (IFPI Austria)	Gold	25,000^{*}
Belgium (BRMA)	Gold	25,000^{*}
Denmark (IFPI Danmark)	Gold	45,000^{‡}
France (SNEP)	Gold	250,000^{*}
New Zealand (RMNZ)	2× Platinum	60,000^{‡}
Norway (IFPI Norway)	Gold	
Sweden (GLF)	Platinum	30,000^{^}
United Kingdom (BPI) Sales since 2004	3× Platinum	1,800,000^{‡}
United States (RIAA)	Gold	500,000^{^}
^{*} Sales figures based on certification alone.^{^} Shipments figures based on certification alone.^{‡} Sales+streaming figures based on certification alone.

== Release history ==
Region	Date	Format(s)	Label(s)	Ref.
Australia	March 1997	CD; cassette	Roadshow Music; Warner Music	
United States	18 November 1997	CD	Columbia	
United Kingdom	16 February 1998	CD; cassette	Columbia	
Japan	14 April 1998	CD	Sony	

== In popular culture ==
The song was also featured in the television series Dawson's Creek in episode 9 of Season 1.

The song was featured in the episode, "CATastrophe" of the Paramount+/Nickelodeon animated series Big Nate.

The song was also featured in a commercial for Puma and Google Home Mini.

== Sandy and Junior version ==
The song was covered in 1998 by Brazilian brother-sister singing duo Sandy & Junior. The Portuguese-language version, "No Fundo do Coração" ("From the Bottom of the Heart"), was released as the third single from the teens' eighth album, Era Uma Vez (Ao Vivo). The album was certified Diamond in Brazil in 1999 by the Brazilian Association of Discs Producers (ABPD) for sales of over 1.8 million copies in Brazil alone. The album was their last for PolyGram Records before moving to Universal Music Group.

== Cascada version ==
"Truly Madly Deeply"

Single by Cascada

from the album Everytime We Touch
- Released: 28 November 2006
- Studio: Plazmatek Studio Cologne; Plazmatek Studio Erkrath
- Length: 2:57 (radio edit); 4:11 (album version)
- Label: Zooland
- Songwriters: Darren Hayes; Daniel Jones
- Producers: Manuel Reuter; Yann Peifer

Cascada singles chronology
"How Do You Do!" (2005)	"Truly Madly Deeply" (2006)	"A Neverending Dream" (2006)

Audio video
- "Truly Madly Deeply" on YouTube

German Eurodance group Cascada covered "Truly Madly Deeply" on their debut album, Everytime We Touch (2007), and released it as the second single in the UK and Germany. Although the album version of the song is a ballad, there is also an up-tempo version of the song that is the main single version. Both versions are featured on the UK edition of the album. First released in the United States exclusively in the iTunes Store on 27 February 2006, the US physical release was 13 March 2007. The single entered the UK Singles Chart at number 17 solely on downloads and peaked at number four the following week, after its physical release. In Ireland, it remained in the top 4 for four weeks.

=== Track listing ===
- UK CD single part 1
1. "Truly Madly Deeply" (radio edit) – 2:57
2. "Everytime We Touch" – 3:19
- UK CD single Part 2
1. "Truly Madly Deeply" (radio edit) – 2:57
2. "Truly Madly Deeply" (album version) – 4:14
3. "Truly Madly Deeply" (club mix) – 4:34
4. "Truly Madly Deeply" (Styles & Breeze remix) – 5:03
5. "Truly Madly Deeply" (Thomas Gold remix) – 8:32
6. "Truly Madly Deeply" (DJ Bomba & El Senor remix) – 6:49
7. "Truly Madly Deeply" (Frisco Remix) – 6:07
- German 12-inch single
1. "Truly Madly Deeply" (2–4 Grooves Remix) – 6:00
2. "Truly Madly Deeply" (Thomas Gold Remix) – 8:29
- German CD single
1. "Truly Madly Deeply" (radio edit) – 2:55
2. "Truly Madly Deeply" (Thomas Gold radio edit) – 3:36
3. "Truly Madly Deeply" (2–4 Grooves radio edit) – 3:27
4. "Truly Madly Deeply" (album version) – 4:12
5. "Truly Madly Deeply" (Candy radio edit) – 3:18
- US CD maxi-single
1. "Truly Madly Deeply" (radio edit) – 2:58
2. "Truly Madly Deeply" (album version) – 4:12
3. "Truly Madly Deeply" (Thomas Gold radio edit) – 3:38
4. "Truly Madly Deeply" (Tune Up! radio edit) – 2:58
5. "Truly Madly Deeply" (Thomas Gold remix) – 8:30
6. "Truly Madly Deeply" (UK club mix) – 4:34
7. "Truly Madly Deeply" (Tune Up! remix) – 4:35
8. "Truly Madly Deeply" (Styles & Breeze remix) – 4:58
9. "Truly Madly Deeply" (DJ Bomba & El Senor remix) – 6:48
10. "Truly Madly Deeply" (Frisco remix) – 6:00
- Australian single 2007
1. "Truly Madly Deeply" (2–4 Grooves Radio Edit) – 3:30
2. "Truly Madly Deeply" (UK radio edit) – 2:54
3. "Truly Madly Deeply" (radio pop mix) – 4:14
4. "Truly Madly Deeply" (Ivan Filini Radio Edit) – 3:07
5. "Truly Madly Deeply" (album version)
6. "Truly Madly Deeply" (Styles & Breeze Remix) – 5:03
7. "Truly Madly Deeply" (Tune Up! Remix) – 4:35
8. "Truly Madly Deeply" (DJ Bomba & El Senor Remix) – 6:49
9. "Truly Madly Deeply" (Thomas Gold Remix) – 8:30

Other remixes

- "Truly Madly Deeply" (Alex K Remix) – 6:15
- "Truly Madly Deeply" (original dance remix, Asian edition)
- "Truly Madly Deeply" (original dance edit, Asian edition)

=== Charts ===
==== Weekly charts ====
Chart (2006–2007)	Peak position
Australia (ARIA)	39
Australian Dance (ARIA)	7
Austria (Ö3 Austria Top 40)	22
Belgium (Ultratip Bubbling Under Flanders)	10
Belgium (Ultratop 50 Wallonia)	25
Europe (Eurochart Hot 100)	14
Finland (Suomen virallinen lista)	16
Germany (GfK)	26
Hungary (Dance Top 40)	25
Hungary (Single Top 40)	3
Ireland (IRMA)	3
Netherlands (Dutch Top 40)	29
Netherlands (Single Top 100)	25
Scottish Singles Sales (Official Charts)	3
Sweden (Sverigetopplistan)	11
UK Singles (Official Charts)	4
US Dance Airplay (Billboard)	14

==== Year-end charts ====
Chart (2006)	Position
UK Singles (OCC)	137

Chart (2007)	Position
Australian Dance (ARIA)	31
Europe (Eurochart Hot 100)	92
Sweden (Sverigetopplistan)	89
UK Singles (OCC)	95

=== Certifications ===
Region	Certification	Certified units/sales
United Kingdom (BPI)	Silver	200,000^{‡}
^{‡} Sales+streaming figures based on certification alone.

=== Release and track listings ===
Country	Date	Format	Label
United Kingdom	11 December 2006	CD	
Germany	14 February 2007	12-inch	Zooland Records
Germany	2 March 2007	12-inch	Zeitgeist
United States	13 March 2007	CD	Robbins Entertainment
Germany	6 April 2007	CD	Zeitgeist

== See also ==
- List of Billboard Adult Contemporary number ones of 1998
