= The Future of Earthly Delites =

Remix album by Savage Garden
- Released: 30 April 1998
- Recorded: 1996–1998
- Genre: Pop
- Label: Columbia
- Producer: Charles Fisher

The Future of Earthly Delites is a remix album released by Australian pop duo Savage Garden, released to promote their world tour of the same name. The album was released as a bonus disc on their self-titled debut album Savage Garden.

== Track listing ==
1. "I Want You" (Xenomania Funky Mix) – 4:34
2. "Break Me Shake Me" (Broken Mix) – 4:18
3. "Santa Monica" (Bittersweet Mix) – 5:00
4. "Tears of Pearls" (Tears on the Dancefloor Mix) – 5:24
5. "Carry on Dancing" (Ultra Violet Mix) – 6:46
6. "All Around Me" (Hardcore Catwalk Mix) – 5:18
7. "I Want You" (Getmeouttathisclubmix) – 4:35
8. "I Want You" (Xenomania 12" Club Mix) – 7:02
9. "To the Moon and Back" (Hani's Num Club Mix) – 9:18
10. "To the Moon and Back" (Hani's Num Dub Mix) – 5:15
11. "To the Moon and Back" (A Journey Through Space and Time Mix) – 4:39
