= The Animal Song =

1999 single by Savage Garden

Single by Savage Garden

from the album Affirmation
- Released: 9 February 1999
- Genre: Pop; dance-pop
- Length: 4:39 (album version); 3:49 (radio edit)
- Label: Roadshow Music
- Songwriters: Darren Hayes; Daniel Jones
- Producers: Savage Garden; Walter Afanasieff

Savage Garden singles chronology
"Santa Monica" (1998)	"The Animal Song" (1999)	"Tears of Pearls" (1999)

Music video
- "The Animal Song" on YouTube

"The Animal Song" is a song by Australian pop music duo Savage Garden, released as a single on 9 February 1999. The song was written for the soundtrack of the film The Other Sister and also appeared on their second studio album, Affirmation (1999), as well as their compilation album, Truly Madly Completely: The Best of Savage Garden. It was the band's first song to be produced by Walter Afanasieff, a producer well known for his work with Mariah Carey. Afanasieff would later produce the group's Affirmation album, and also Darren Hayes' first solo album, Spin.

== Background ==
The video for the song was directed by Jim Gable. It features Hayes walking through a parade, with intercut scenes from The Other Sister with Juliette Lewis. The song is also used in the "Shamu Rocks" seasonal nighttime show at SeaWorld, America. "The Animal Song" became the group's third Canadian number one single, topping the singles chart for three weeks, from 27 March 1999. It also peaked at number three in both Australia and New Zealand, number 19 in the United States, and number 16 on the UK Singles Chart.

In June 2015, singer Darren Hayes explained that Savage Garden had been offered to record a song for Runaway Bride. However they passed up on the proposal and instead chose to compose a song "for the film that flopped". Daniel Jones described "The Animal Song" as a "transitional song" between their first and second albums and a "fun song that made you feel good".

The lyrics of the song deal with the struggles experienced by individuals suffering from mental illnesses, and more generally with the difficulty in expressing one's emotions and finding compassion in a confusing world that stultifies individuals with all kinds of rules. According to Darren Hayes, his longing for life in the tropical climes of Australia while living in the United States provided further inspiration for the lyrics.

== Track listings ==
=== Australia ===
CD single

1. "The Animal Song" (radio edit)
2. "The Animal Song" (album version)
3. "Santa Monica" (Bittersweet remix)

=== United States and Canada ===
CD and cassette single

1. "The Animal Song" (album version) – 4:40
2. "Santa Monica" (Bittersweet remix) – 5:00

=== United Kingdom ===
CD1

1. "The Animal Song" (radio edit) – 3:41
2. "Carry on Dancing" (Ultra Violet mix) – 6:44
3. "The Animal Song" (instrumental) – 4:17

CD2

1. "The Animal Song" – 4:40
2. "All Around Me" – 4:09
3. "Break Me Shake Me" (Broken mix) – 4:18

Cassette single

1. "The Animal Song"
2. "All Around Me"

=== Europe ===
CD1

1. "The Animal Song" – 3:50
2. "Santa Monica" (Bittersweet remix) – 5:00

CD2

1. "The Animal Song" (radio edit) – 3:50
2. "Carry on Dancing" (Ultra Violet mix) – 6:44
3. "The Animal Song" (instrumental) – 4:40
4. "All Around Me" – 4:09
5. "Break Me Shake Me" (Broken mix) – 4:18

=== Japan ===
CD single

1. "The Animal Song" – 4:40
2. "The Animal Song" (radio edit) – 3:43
3. "The Animal Song" (7-inch vocal mix) – 4:21
4. "The Animal Song" (instrumental version) – 4:42
5. "The Animal Song" (a cappella) – 3:46

== Charts ==
=== Weekly charts ===
Chart (1999)	Peak position
Australia (ARIA)	3
Belgium (Ultratip Bubbling Under Flanders)	15
Canada (Nielsen SoundScan)	1
Canada Top Singles (RPM)	5
Canada Adult Contemporary (RPM)	9
Czech Republic (IFPI)	10
Estonia (Eesti Top 20)	2
Europe (Eurochart Hot 100)	38
Iceland (Íslenski Listinn Topp 40)	23
Ireland (IRMA)	19
Italy (Musica e dischi)	50
Netherlands (Dutch Top 40 Tipparade)	6
Netherlands (Single Top 100)	48
New Zealand (Recorded Music NZ)	3
Norway (VG-lista)	12
Scottish Singles Sales (Official Charts)	18
Spain (Top 40 Radio)	36
Sweden (Sverigetopplistan)	3
UK Singles (Official Charts)	18
UK Airplay (Music Week)	20
US Billboard Hot 100	19
US Adult Pop Airplay (Billboard)	20
US Pop Airplay (Billboard)	14

=== Year-end charts ===
Chart (1999)	Position
Australia (ARIA)	18
Canada Top Singles (RPM)	25
Canada Adult Contemporary (RPM)	62
Romania (Romanian Top 100)	45
Sweden (Hitlistan)	40
US Adult Top 40 (Billboard)	72
US Mainstream Top 40 (Billboard)	83

=== Decade-end charts ===
Chart (1990–1999)	Position
Canada (Nielsen Soundscan)	54

== Certifications ==
Region	Certification	Certified units/sales
Australia (ARIA)	Platinum	70,000^{^}
Sweden (GLF)	Gold	15,000^{^}
^{^} Shipments figures based on certification alone.

== Release history ==
Region	Date	Format(s)	Label(s)	Ref(s).
United States	9 February 1999	Contemporary hit radio	Columbia	
Australia	23 February 1999	CD	Roadshow Music	
United States	23 February 1999	CD; cassette	Columbia	
Canada	9 March 1999	CD	Columbia	
Japan	25 March 1999	CD	SME	
United Kingdom	28 June 1999	CD; cassette	Columbia	
