= To the Moon and Back (Savage Garden song) =

1996 single by Savage Garden

- 1997 North American and UK cover

Single by Savage Garden

from the album Savage Garden
- B-side: "Memories Are Designed to Fade"; "Santa Monica"; "All Around Me"
- Released: 4 November 1996
- Length: 5:42 (album version); 4:13 (short edit); 3:44 (radio edit)
- Label: Warner Music; Roadshow
- Songwriters: Darren Hayes; Daniel Jones
- Producer: Charles Fisher

Savage Garden singles chronology
"I Want You" (1996)	"To the Moon and Back" (1996)	"Truly Madly Deeply" (1997)

Music videos
- "To the Moon and Back" on YouTube; "To the Moon and Back" (US version) on YouTube

Alternative cover
- 1998 re-release cover

"To the Moon and Back" is a song by Australian pop duo Savage Garden, released in Australia on 4 November 1996 as the second single from their self-titled 1997 album. It was the follow-up to their first hit "I Want You" and won the 1997 ARIA Music Award for Song of the Year. The song became the band's first number-one single in their native country, reached number three on the UK Singles Chart, and peaked at number 24 on the US Billboard Hot 100.

== Background ==
In an interview with Apple Music about their debut album, singer Darren Hayes explained the origins of the song.

"I was a big science fiction fan - I loved Blade Runner. I wrote it from that point of view, or the idea of what it means to be human. That idea of yearning to express your emotions and your feelings and for that to be legitimized. There was also someone in my life whose persona was very standoffish and who pushed everyone who loved her away. But I could see underneath that hard shell, there was so much pain and all that stuff that I identified with - mum never loved her much, daddy never kept in touch, these are things actually bothering this person."

== Release and chart performances ==
After the success of their debut single, "I Want You", there were high expectations for the song as its follow-up. In Australia, it became the duo's first number-one single. In July 1997, following the song's release in the United States, the song entered the top 40 of the Billboard Hot 100 for only one week, peaking at number 37 the final week of August 1997. In the United Kingdom, the single was originally released in September 1997 but failed to chart within the top 40, stalling at number 55 for one week.

Subsequently, "Truly Madly Deeply" became an international hit, reaching number one on several music charts, including the Billboard Hot 100 and Adult Contemporary charts. While the song did not initially experience success in the US, the success of "Truly Madly Deeply" inspired Savage Garden and Columbia Records to remix "To the Moon and Back" in 1998 and release it again. In the wake of such success, the band decided the song had greater potential to become a hit than its first chartings had borne out, and so instead of mining a fourth single from the album as they had for the Australian market, they decided to mix a shorter edit of "To the Moon and Back" and re-release it internationally in 1998. This time the song peaked at number 24 in the US. In the UK, the single debuted at number three, becoming Savage Garden's biggest hit in the country. This prompted the re-release of their debut single, remixed as "I Want You '98".

== Critical reception ==
Larry Flick from Billboard wrote, "The follow-up to the platinum-selling "I Want You" should keep the momentum of this charming Australian duo building quite nicely. Wisely, this track doesn't attempt to mimic the quirky, almost novelty-driven sound of its predecessor. Instead, it affirms partners Darren Hayes and Daniel Jones' talent for crafting immediately catchy hooks and solid, sing-along choruses. Once again, the music warmly revisits the new-romantic sound of the '80s with its melodramatic blend of satiny synths and jittery guitars." A reviewer from Music Week rated the song three out of five, saying that it is not as hook-driven as "I Want You", "but it's still commercial enough to win over ILR and clinch a Top 30 place."

== Music videos ==
There have been three different music videos for the song. The first, accompanying the Australian release of the song, was directed by Catherine Caines and Chris Bentley, and was shot in black and white. This version features Hayes and Jones performing on what appears to be a space vessel, whilst a female passenger watches.

The second, accompanying the United States and original United Kingdom release of the song, was directed by Nigel Dick, and features Darren and Daniel performing in an apartment in Malibu whilst a female records the performance. It was filmed between 17 and 18 April 1997. This American video features Hayes with long hair.

The third version was filmed in New York and features a sad-looking teenage girl traveling by the metro to meet her friends (apparently other misfits like herself). This video features Hayes with short hair, and is the most well-known of the three versions. A version of the video accompanied by a dance remix of the track was also released, which included some footage of the second video.

== Track listings ==
=== Australia ===
- CD and cassette single
1. "To the Moon and Back" (radio edit)
2. "Santa Monica"
3. "Memories Are Designed to Fade"
4. "To the Moon and Back" (album version)

=== United Kingdom ===
- CD1 (1997)
1. "To the Moon and Back" (short edit) – 4:13
2. "To the Moon and Back" (album version) – 5:42
3. "To the Moon and Back" (Hani's Num club mix) – 9:18
4. "Memories Are Designed to Fade" – 3:39
- CD2 (1997)
1. "To the Moon and Back" (album version) – 5:42
2. "To the Moon and Back" (Hani's Num radio edit) – 3:57
3. "To the Moon and Back" (Escape into Hyperspace) – 4:39
4. "All Around Me" – 4:11
- Cassette single (1997)
1. "To the Moon and Back" (album version) – 5:42
2. "Memories Are Designed to Fade" – 3:39
- CD1 (1998)
1. "To the Moon and Back" (album version) – 5:42
2. "To the Moon and Back" (Almighty radio edit) – 4:05
3. "Truly Madly Deeply" (karaoke version) – 4:38
- CD2 (1998)
1. "To the Moon and Back" (radio edit) – 3:44
2. "To the Moon and Back" (Almighty Fired Up mix) – 6:16
3. "To the Moon and Back" (Almighty Definitive mix) – 6:09
- Cassette single (1998)
1. "To the Moon and Back" (album version) – 5:42
2. "To the Moon and Back" (Almighty radio edit) – 3:44

=== Europe ===
- CD1 (1997)
1. "To the Moon and Back" (short edit) – 4:13
2. "Memories Are Designed to Fade" – 3:39
- CD2 (1997)
1. "To the Moon and Back" (short edit) – 4:13
2. "To the Moon and Back" – 5:41
3. "To the Moon and Back" (Hani's Num radio edit) – 3:57
4. "To the Moon and Back" (Escape into Hyper Space) – 4:39
5. "Memories Are Designed to Fade" – 3:39
- CD1 (1998)
1. "To the Moon and Back" (radio edit) – 3:42
2. "To the Moon and Back" (The Almighty 7-inch mix) – 3:48
- CD2 (1997)
1. "To the Moon and Back" (radio edit) – 3:42
2. "To the Moon and Back" (The Almighty 7-inch mix) – 3:48
3. "To the Moon and Back" (Almighty Fired Up mix) – 6:16
4. "To the Moon and Back" (Almighty Definitive mix) – 6:09

=== United States ===
- CD and cassette single (1997)
1. "To the Moon and Back" (long edit) – 4:32
2. "Memories Are Designed to Fade" – 3:39

=== Japan ===
- CD single
1. "To the Moon and Back"
2. "To the Moon and Back" (Hani's radio edit)
3. "To the Moon and Back" (Hani's Num club mix)
4. "To the Moon and Back" (Num dub)
5. "To the Moon and Back" (Escape into Hyper Space)

== Credits and personnel ==
Credits are adapted from the Savage Garden album booklet.

Studios

- Mixed at Gotham Studios (Melbourne, Australia)
- Mastered at Sony Music Studios (New York City)

Personnel

- Darren Hayes – writing, lead vocals, background vocals, vocal arrangement
- Daniel Jones – writing, additional vocals, additional guitars, keyboards, sequencing, string arrangement
- Rex Goh – guitar
- Alex Hewitson – bass
- Terepai Richmond – drums, percussion
- Jackie Orszaczky – orchestration, conducting
- Charles Fisher – production, vocal arrangement
- Jim Bonnefond – vocal arrangement
- Chris Lord-Alge – mixing
- Vlado Meller – mastering

== Charts ==
=== Weekly charts ===
Chart (1996–1999)	Peak position
Australia (ARIA)	1
Belgium (Ultratop 50 Flanders)	28
Canada Top Singles (RPM)	15
Canada Adult Contemporary (RPM)	17
Canada Rock/Alternative (RPM)	27
Europe (Eurochart Hot 100)	23
France (SNEP)	11
Germany (GfK)	14
Greece (IFPI)	4
Iceland (Íslenski Listinn Topp 40)	27
Ireland (IRMA)	14
Latvia (Latvijas Top 20)	1
Netherlands (Dutch Top 40)	33
Netherlands (Single Top 100)	35
New Zealand (Recorded Music NZ)	4
Scottish Singles Sales (Official Charts)	4
Spain (Top 40 Radio)	20
Sweden (Sverigetopplistan)	11
Switzerland (Schweizer Hitparade)	16
UK Singles (Official Charts)	3
UK Airplay (Music Week)	5
US Billboard Hot 100	24
US Adult Contemporary (Billboard)	29
US Adult Pop Airplay (Billboard)	17
US Pop Airplay (Billboard)	17

Chart (2025)	Peak position
Moldova Airplay (TopHit)	93
Poland (Polish Airplay Top 100)	72

=== Year-end charts ===
Chart (1996)	Position
Australia (ARIA)	72

Chart (1997)	Position
Australia (ARIA)	17
Canada Top Singles (RPM)	94
New Zealand (RIANZ)	47
Romania (Romanian Top 100)	32
Sweden (Topplistan)	27
US Top 40/Mainstream (Billboard)	83

Chart (1998)	Position
Germany (Media Control)	82
UK Singles (OCC)	30
UK Airplay (Music Week)	20
US Adult Top 40 (Billboard)	66
US Mainstream Top 40 (Billboard)	63

Chart (1999)	Position
France (SNEP)	98

== Certifications ==
Region	Certification	Certified units/sales
Australia (ARIA)	Platinum	70,000^{^}
France (SNEP)	Gold	250,000^{*}
New Zealand (RMNZ)	Gold	15,000^{‡}
Sweden (GLF)	Gold	15,000^{^}
United Kingdom (BPI)	Platinum	600,000^{‡}
^{*} Sales figures based on certification alone.^{^} Shipments figures based on certification alone.^{‡} Sales+streaming figures based on certification alone.

== Release history ==
Region	Date	Format(s)	Label(s)	Ref(s).
Australia	4 November 1996	CD; cassette	Warner Music; Roadshow	
United States	27 May 1997	Contemporary hit radio	Columbia	
United States	8 July 1997	CD; cassette	Columbia	
Japan	30 July 1997	CD	Sony	
United Kingdom	15 September 1997	CD; cassette	Columbia	
United Kingdom (re-release)	10 August 1998	CD; cassette	Columbia	
