= I Want You (Savage Garden song) =

1996 single by Savage Garden

- 1997 North American and UK cover

Single by Savage Garden

from the album Savage Garden
- B-side: "Fire Inside the Man"; "Tears of Pearls"; "Mine (And You Could Be)"
- Released: 27 May 1996
- Genre: Synth-pop
- Length: 3:53 (album version); 3:38 (radio edit)
- Label: Roadshow
- Songwriters: Darren Hayes; Daniel Jones
- Producer: Charles Fisher

Savage Garden singles chronology
| "I Want You" (1996) | "To the Moon and Back" (1996) |

Music videos
- "I Want You" on YouTube; "I Want You" (US version) on YouTube

"I Want You" is a song by Australian pop duo Savage Garden, originally released in Australia on 27 May 1996 by label Roadshow as the lead single from their debut album, Savage Garden (1997). The single reached number one in Canada and peaked at number four in Australia and on the US Billboard Hot 100. Much of the song's chart success in the US was the result of Rosie O'Donnell playing the song on several episodes of The Rosie O'Donnell Show. In the United Kingdom, the single was issued twice, achieving its highest peak of number 11 during its initial release in 1997.

At the APRA Music Awards of 1998 "I Want You" won Most Performed Australian Work Overseas. In January 2018, as part of Triple M's "Ozzest 100", the 'most Australian' songs of all time, the album version of the song was ranked number 87. In February 2023, Australian electronic band Peking Duk released a remake of the song with re-recorded vocals from Darren Hayes.

== Content ==
The song's lyrics refer to the attraction exerted by a person possessing strong sex appeal. They fascinate the singer and arouse his curiosity, even though he is not sure whether he needs them at all. Singer Darren Hayes described it as a song about "being in love with a male energy", when asked if the song had a coded gay message.

In an interview with Apple Music about their debut album, Darren Hayes also said:

"I have such a soft spot for this song and it just keeps coming back. It's based on a dream that I had where I fell in love with a boy. And when I woke up, I missed him. I didn't know how I would ever feel that feeling again. I had this almost beautiful melancholy, romantic grief. I remembered everything about this boy who I'd never met. The smell, the kiss, the feeling, the butterflies in my tummy, all that stuff. And so I spent about a week mourning that feeling. I used to think, 'Maybe if I go to sleep, I'll see him again.'"

== Critical reception ==
Larry Flick from Billboard magazine noted that the song "has a jittery synth-pop beat reminiscent of such '80s-era Brit-pop heroes as Duran Duran." He added, "Partners Darren Hayes and Daniel Jones are quite the harmonious pair, and they are photogenic enough to ensure instant teen-idol status. Top 40 programmers should waste no time in slammin' this one on the air." British magazine Music Week rated it five out of five, describing it as "a great pop song akin to Roxette at their hook-happy best" and "a challenger for the UK number one spot". In 2025, the song ranked 97 on the Triple J Hottest 100 of Australian Songs.

== Music videos ==
Two music videos were released for the song. Both videos present Darren Hayes with long black hair. The first video is a low-budget version released in 1996 for Australian markets. It showed the band performing in a room full of disco lights and Darren Hayes singing on the back of a moving vehicle.

The second video was filmed on a high budget and premiered in 1997 for international markets in conjunction with the single's worldwide and American releases. Directed by Nigel Dick, it features the band in a stylised futuristic warehouse and recording studio. It was filmed on 11 February 1997 at the Harbor Generating Station in Long Beach, California. The international version was featured on the band's compilation Truly Madly Completely: The Best of Savage Garden (2005), while the Australian version was not available until the release of the compilation The Singles (2015).

In a 2022 interview with News Corp, Darren Hayes "said he only recently discovered the reason he was filmed in a metal head brace [for the video]... was 'because the lead singer looks gay when he moves.'" Hayes added, "They were just going to tell me it was an ‘artistic decision’. I'm still fucking angry about that."

== Track listings ==
=== Australia ===
- CD and cassette single
1. "I Want You" – 3:53
2. "Fire Inside the Man" – 4:11
- Remixes CD single
1. "I Want You" (original radio version) – 3:54
2. "I Want You" (Flu club mix) – 6:22
3. "I Want You" (Pee Wee club mix) – 6:30
4. "I Want You" (Flu radio edit) – 3:44
5. "I Want You" (Flu Midnight mix) – 6:24

=== United Kingdom ===
- CD single (1997)
1. "I Want You" (album version)
2. "I Want You" (Xenomania Funky mix)
3. "I Want You" (Xenomania 12-inch club mix)
4. "I Want You" (Sharp Miami mix)
- 12-inch single (1997)

A1. "I Want You" (Xenomania Funky mix)
A2. "I Want You" (Xenomania 12-inch club mix)
B1. "I Want You" (Sharp Miami mix)
B2. "I Want You" (album version)

- Cassette single (1997)
1. "I Want You" (album version)
2. "Promises"
- CD1 (1998)
1. "I Want You '98" (Bascombe mix)
2. "I Want You '98" (Sash! radio edit)
3. "To the Moon and Back" (karaoke version)
- CD2 (1998)
1. "I Want You '98" (Sash! extended mix)
2. "I Want You" (Sharp Miami mix)
3. "I Want You" (Xenomania Funky mix)
- Cassette single (1998)
1. "I Want You '98" (Bascombe mix)
2. "I Want You '98" (Sash! radio edit)

=== Europe ===
- CD1
1. "I Want You" (radio version) – 3:37
2. "I Want You" (hot radio mix) – 3:33
- CD2
1. "I Want You" (radio version) – 3:37
2. "I Want You" (Pee Wee Club mix) – 6:28
3. "Tears of Pearls" – 3:47
4. "Mine (And You Could Be)" – 4:29

=== United States ===
- CD and cassette single
1. "I Want You" – 3:52
2. "Tears of Pearls" – 3:47
- Maxi-CD single
1. "I Want You" (album version) – 3:52
2. "I Want You" (Jason Nevins' radio remix) – 3:37
3. "I Want You" (Bastone club mix) – 8:30
4. "I Want You" (I Need I Want mix) – 7:55
5. "I Want You" (hot radio mix) – 3:33
- 12-inch single

A1. "I Want You" (Jason Nevins' radio remix) – 3:37
A2. "I Want You" (album version) – 3:52
B1. "I Want You" (Bastone club mix) – 8:30
B2. "I Want You" (I Need I Want mix) – 7:55

=== Japan ===
- CD single
1. "I Want You" (album version) – 3:53
2. "I Want You" (Jason Nevins' radio remix) – 3:38
3. "I Want You" (Bastone club mix) – 8:31
4. "I Want You" (I Need I Want mix) – 7:56
5. "I Want You" (hot radio mix) – 3:34

== Credits and personnel ==
Credits are adapted from the Savage Garden album booklet.

Studios

- Mixed at Gotham Studios (Melbourne, Australia)
- Mastered at Sony Music Studios (New York City)

Personnel

- Darren Hayes – writing, lead vocals, background vocals, vocal arrangement
- Daniel Jones – writing, additional vocals, additional guitars, keyboards, sequencing
- Rex Goh – guitar
- Alex Hewitson – bass
- Terepai Richmond – drums, percussion
- Charles Fisher – production, vocal arrangement
- Jim Bonnefond – vocal arrangement
- Chris Lord-Alge – mixing
- Vlado Meller – mastering

== Charts ==
=== Weekly charts ===
"I Want You"

| Chart (1996–1997) | Peak position |
|---|---|
| Australia (ARIA) | 4 |
| Austria (Ö3 Austria Top 40) | 14 |
| Belgium (Ultratop 50 Flanders) | 27 |
| Belgium (Ultratop 50 Wallonia) | 33 |
| Canada (Nielsen SoundScan) | 1 |
| Canada Top Singles (RPM) | 1 |
| Canada Adult Contemporary (RPM) | 8 |
| Canada Dance/Urban (RPM) | 4 |
| Estonia (Eesti Top 20) | 2 |
| Europe (Eurochart Hot 100) | 16 |
| France (SNEP) | 15 |
| Germany (GfK) | 38 |
| Hungary (Mahasz) | 5 |
| Iceland (Íslenski Listinn Topp 40) | 9 |
| Ireland (IRMA) | 24 |
| Israel (Israeli Singles Chart) | 2 |
| Latvia (Latvijas Top 20) | 6 |
| Netherlands (Dutch Top 40) | 22 |
| Netherlands (Single Top 100) | 38 |
| New Zealand (Recorded Music NZ) | 13 |
| Poland Airplay (Music & Media) | 7 |
| Scottish Singles Sales (Official Charts) | 5 |
| Spain (Top 40 Radio) | 22 |
| Sweden (Sverigetopplistan) | 11 |
| Switzerland (Schweizer Hitparade) | 21 |
| UK Singles (Official Charts) | 11 |
| UK Airplay (Music Week) | 19 |
| US Billboard Hot 100 | 4 |
| US Adult Pop Airplay (Billboard) | 4 |
| US Dance Singles Sales (Billboard) | 48 |
| US Pop Airplay (Billboard) | 1 |
| US Rhythmic Airplay (Billboard) | 32 |
| US CHR/Pop (Radio & Records) | 1 |
| US CHR/Rhythmic (Radio & Records) | 43 |
| US Hot AC (Radio & Records) | 5 |
| US Pop/Alternative (Radio & Records) | 12 |

"I Want You '98"

| Chart (1998) | Peak position |
|---|---|
| Scottish Singles Sales (Official Charts) | 8 |
| UK Singles (Official Charts) | 12 |
| UK Airplay (Music Week) | 12 |

=== Year-end charts ===
| Chart (1996) | Position |
|---|---|
| Australia (ARIA) | 12 |

| Chart (1997) | Position |
|---|---|
| Brazil (Crowley) | 54 |
| Canada Top Singles (RPM) | 8 |
| Canada Adult Contemporary (RPM) | 61 |
| Canada Dance/Urban (RPM) | 28 |
| France (SNEP) | 88 |
| Sweden (Topplistan) | 80 |
| UK Singles (OCC) | 189 |
| US Billboard Hot 100 | 22 |
| US Adult Top 40 (Billboard) | 9 |
| US Top 40/Mainstream (Billboard) | 10 |
| US CHR/Pop (Radio & Records) | 6 |
| US Hot AC (Radio & Records) | 9 |

=== Decade-end charts ===
| Chart (1990–1999) | Position |
|---|---|
| Canada (Nielsen SoundScan) | 47 |

== Certifications and sales ==
| Region | Certification | Certified units/sales |
|---|---|---|
| Australia (ARIA) | Platinum | 70,000^{^} |
| New Zealand (RMNZ) | Gold | 15,000^{‡} |
| United Kingdom (BPI) | Silver | 200,000^{‡} |
| United States (RIAA) | Gold | 600,000 |
^{^} Shipments figures based on certification alone.^{‡} Sales+streaming figures based on certification alone.

== Release history ==
| Region | Date | Format(s) | Label(s) | Ref(s). |
|---|---|---|---|---|
| Australia | 27 May 1996 | CD; cassette | Roadshow | |
| United States | 11 February 1997 | CD; cassette | Columbia | |
| United States | 11 February 1997 | Contemporary hit radio | Columbia | |
| Japan | 23 April 1997 | CD | Sony | |
| United Kingdom | 2 June 1997 | 12-inch vinyl; CD; cassette | Columbia | |
| United Kingdom (re-release) | 30 November 1998 | CD; cassette | Columbia | |
