= Savage Garden (Savage Garden album) =

Studio album by Savage Garden
- Released: 24 March 1997
- Recorded: 1995–1996
- Genres: Pop; soft rock; dance-pop
- Length: 49:44 (Australia); 44:35 (International)
- Labels: Columbia; Roadshow
- Producer: Charles Fisher

Savage Garden chronology
Savage Garden (1997)	Truly Madly Deeply – Ultra Rare Tracks (1998)

Singles from Savage Garden
- 1. "I Want You" Released: 27 May 1996; 2. "To the Moon and Back" Released: 18 November 1996; 3. "Truly Madly Deeply" Released: 3 March 1997; 4. "Break Me Shake Me" Released: 16 June 1997; 5. "Universe" Released: 20 October 1997; 6. "Santa Monica" Released: 7 December 1998; 7. "Tears of Pearls" Released: 11 May 1999

Professional ratings
Review scores
Source	Rating
AllMusic	3/5 stars
Christgau's Consumer Guide	(2-star Honorable Mention)
Music Week	4/5 stars
The Rolling Stone Album Guide	2.5/5 stars

Savage Garden is the debut studio album by Australian pop duo Savage Garden, released on 24 March 1997 in Australia by Columbia Records and Roadshow Music. The album won the award for Highest Selling Album at the 12th Annual ARIA Music Awards, selling more than 12 million copies worldwide, according to Billboard magazine. In September 1997, Savage Garden won a record ten ARIA Awards from 13 nominations for the album and associated singles. As of 2005, Savage Garden had been certified diamond in Canada, 12× platinum in Australia, 7× platinum in the US, 2× platinum in New Zealand, Singapore, and in the UK.

== Background ==
The band had formed in June 1994, consisting of multi-instrumentalist and producer Daniel Jones and vocalist Darren Hayes. In 1995, they entered the studio to work on their debut album with producer, Charles Fisher (Air Supply, Moving Pictures, 1927). After the success of "I Want You", a deal was struck with Columbia Records. The record label's executives sent Darren Hayes and Daniel Jones to Sydney for 8 months, tasking them with writing material. It was there that they would come up with most of the songs for their debut album, including "Truly Madly Deeply", for which Darren Hayes wrote the chorus while dining out in Kings Cross.

The album's track listing varies depending on territory. The original Australian version of the album includes the tracks "Mine" and "All Around Me", which were removed from the international track listing. "Mine" was removed due to concerns held by the record company over the line "crosses and crucifixes", and "All Around Me" was removed for being overtly sexual. The international version adds the track "Promises", which had previously been released in Australia as the B-side to "Truly Madly Deeply". Also, the international version of "Truly Madly Deeply" has a new live drum track, compared to the original Australian version, which has a drum machine. Thus, this became the hit single version released outside Australia. The track order was also changed to give prominence to the three hit singles, which open the album. The Japanese version of the album uses the international track listing, however, includes "Mine" as a bonus track between "Promises" and "Santa Monica". In support of the group's Asian tour in 1998, a special double-album package was released in the region. The first disc features the international version of the album, and the second disc includes B-sides, remixes and rare tracks. Darren Hayes has noted that the international track listing was not what the band wanted (particularly because Mine was one of his favourite tracks, and because the band had laboured over the track order), but the US record label insisted.

== Chart performance ==
In March 1997, the album, Savage Garden, entered the Australian charts at No. 1 and peaked there for a total of 19 weeks. The album was released internationally two weeks later. The album reached No. 3 on the US Billboard 200 and was certified gold by RIAA.

After the album was reissued on vinyl in 2023, Savage Garden charted at number 16 on the UK Vinyl Albums Chart Top 40 on 16 June 2023.

== Singles ==
- "I Want You" was released in July 1996 as the group's debut single under Roadshow Music and Warner Music. It peaked at No. 4 on the Australian Recording Industry Association (ARIA) Singles Chart and on the 1996 End of Year Singles Chart, becoming the highest-selling single of 1996 by an Australian artist. On 30 September, they received their first ARIA Award nomination, in the category 'Breakthrough Artist – Single'. Their success garnered interest from international labels and they signed to Columbia Records. "I Want You" was released in North America in February, where it peaked at No. 4 on the United States Billboard Hot 100 and by April had achieved gold status according to Recording Industry Association of America (RIAA). It peaked at No. 1 on the Canadian Singles Chart. "I Want You" was released across Europe in April 1997, reaching No. 11 on the UK Singles Chart.
- "To the Moon and Back" was released in November 1996 in Australia, reaching No. 1 in January 1997. The single became the band's highest-charting single in the United Kingdom, peaking at #3 on the UK Singles Chart, after its second release in June 1998.
- "Truly Madly Deeply", the band's third Australian single, was released in March 1997, reaching No. 1 there, and soon became their signature song. By the end of 1997, "Truly Madly Deeply" became the most-played song on American radio, and the only one-sided single to spend a full year in the Top 30 of the Billboard Hot 100. It also replaced Elton John's "Candle in the Wind 1997" at the top of the charts after that song's 14-week run at No. 1. The single became the band's highest-selling single in the UK, selling 645,000 copies after just six months of release.
- "Break Me Shake Me" was released as the album's fourth Australian single in June 1997. It achieved minor success, and thus, was later issued in Europe and Japan in September 1998, complete with a brand new music video. The single was not released in the United Kingdom.
- "Universe" was released as the album's fifth Australian single in October 1997. Exclusively released in Australia, it is one of the band's least-known singles, but is still popular amongst Australian fans.
- "Santa Monica" was released as a single in Japan in December 1998, accompanied by a video of a live performance of the song at the Hard Rock Cafe.
- "Tears of Pearls" was released as the album's final single in May 1999, exclusively in Europe. The single was backed with a music video featuring footage from the group's Future of Earthly Delites tour.

Additionally, "All Around Me" was released as a radio-only promotional single in Australia in January 1998, although around 3,000 physical copies were given away via a radio competition and at the band's second massive concert in Brisbane.

== Accolades ==
This album fetched the duo a record of 10 awards at the ARIA Awards 1997, grabbing Best Album, Best Single, Best Group, Song of the Year, Best Debut Album, Best Independent Release, Best Pop Release and Highest Selling Single award—the most awards ever won by a single act in one year. The following year at the ARIA Awards 1998, the album won two more awards—Highest Selling Album award and Outstanding Achievement Award. In October 2010, Savage Garden was listed in the top 40 in the book, 100 Best Australian Albums. In December 2021, the album was listed at no. 9 in Rolling Stone Australia’s ‘200 Greatest Albums of All Time’ countdown.

== Track listing ==
All tracks are written by Darren Hayes and Daniel Jones; all tracks are produced by Charles Fisher and Chris Lord-Alge, except where noted

Original Australian release
No.	Title	Producer(s)	Length
1.	"To the Moon & Back"		5:41
2.	"Carry On Dancing"		3:45
3.	"Tears of Pearls"	Fisher; Mike Pela	3:46
4.	"I Want You"		3:52
5.	"Truly Madly Deeply" (original Australian version)	Fisher; Pela	4:37
6.	"Violet"		4:04
7.	"All Around Me"		4:11
8.	"Universe"	Fisher; Pela	4:20
9.	"A Thousand Words"		4:00
10.	"Break Me Shake Me"		3:23
11.	"Mine"		4:30
12.	"Santa Monica"	Hayes; D. Jones; Oliver Jones	3:37

International release
No.	Title	Producer(s)	Length
1.	"To the Moon & Back"		5:41
2.	"I Want You"		3:52
3.	"Truly Madly Deeply" (International Version)	Fisher; Pela	4:37
4.	"Tears of Pearls"	Fisher; Pela	3:46
5.	"Universe"	Fisher; Pela	4:20
6.	"Carry On Dancing"		3:45
7.	"Violet"		4:04
8.	"Break Me Shake Me"		3:23
9.	"A Thousand Words"		4:00
10.	"Promises"		3:31
11.	"Santa Monica"	Hayes; D. Jones; O. Jones	3:37

Japanese bonus track
No.	Title	Length
12.	"Mine (And You Could Be)"	4:30

Asian Tour Edition bonus disc
No.	Title	Producer(s)	Length
1.	"Mine"		4:30
2.	"Love Can Move You"	Hayes; D. Jones	4:47
3.	"All Around Me"		4:11
4.	"I'll Bet He Was Cool"	Hayes; D. Jones; O. Jones	3:58
5.	"I Want You" (Xenomania Funky Mix)	Fisher; Lord-Alge; Xenomania	4:34
6.	"To the Moon & Back" (Hani's Num Radio Edit)	Fisher; Lord-Alge; Hani	3:57
7.	"Truly Madly Deeply" (Original Australian Version)	Fisher; Pela	4:37
8.	"Break Me Shake Me" (Broken Mix)		4:18

Expanded Edition 2015 (Disc 2)
No.	Title	Length
1.	"I Want You" (live at London Radio)
2.	"Truly Madly Deeply" (live at London Radio)
3.	"To the Moon & Back" (live at ARIA Awards)
4.	"I Want You" (live acoustic)
5.	"Break Me Shake Me" (live acoustic)
6.	"I Want You" (Jason Nevins Radio Remix)
7.	"I Want You" (Hot Radio Mix)
8.	"To the Moon & Back" (Fly a Pell)
9.	"To the Moon & Back 2004" (Almighty Club Class Mix)

== B-sides ==
1. "Promises" – B-side to "I Want You" and "Truly Madly Deeply", included on the international version of the album
2. "Mine" (later subtitled as "Mine (And You Could Be)") – B-side to "I Want You", included on the album in Australia and Japan, and the bonus remix disc in Asia
3. "All Around Me" – B-side to "To the Moon and Back", included on the album in Australia, and the bonus remix disc in Asia
4. "Fire Inside the Man" – B-side to "I Want You"
5. "Memories Are Designed to Fade" – B-side to "To the Moon and Back"
6. "This Side of Me" – B-side to "Truly Madly Deeply" and "Universe"
7. "Love Can Move You" – B-side to "Truly Madly Deeply", "Universe" and "Tears of Pearls", included on the bonus remix disc in Asia
8. "I'll Bet He Was Cool" – B-side to "Truly Madly Deeply" and "Break Me Shake Me", included on the bonus remix disc in Asia

== Personnel ==
- Darren Hayes – vocals
- Daniel Jones – keyboards, sequencing, additional guitars, backing vocals
- Terepai Richmond – drums, percussion
- Alex Hewetson – bass
- Rex Goh – guitars
- Jackie Orzaczky – strings orchestration and conducting
- Written by Darren Hayes and Daniel Jones
- Produced by Charles Fisher except "Santa Monica", which is produced by Savage Garden
- Vocals arranged by Darren Hayes, Charles Fisher and Jim Bonnefond
- Strings arranged by Daniel Jones
- Mixed by Chris Lord-Alge except "Truly Madly Deeply", "Tears of Pearls" and "Universe", which were mixed by Mike Pela and "Santa Monica" which was mixed by Oliver Jones.
- Mastered by Vlado Meller
- Album cover and inside photography of The Garden of Earthly Delights by Yelena Yemchuk
- Design by Aimee Macauley

== Charts ==
=== Weekly charts ===
Chart (1997–1998)	Peak position
Australian Albums (ARIA)	1
Austrian Albums (Ö3 Austria)	10
Belgian Albums (Ultratop Flanders)	35
Canadian Albums (Billboard)	2
Czech Albums (IFPI CR)	11
Danish Albums (Hitlisten)	4
Dutch Albums (Album Top 100)	41
Estonian Albums (Eesti Top 10)	1
European Albums (Music & Media)	5
Finnish Albums (Suomen virallinen lista)	2
French Albums (SNEP)	7
German Albums (Offizielle Top 100)	14
Greek Albums (IFPI Greece)	1
Hungarian Albums (MAHASZ)	21
Icelandic Albums (Tonlist)	10
Irish Albums (IRMA)	10
Italian Albums (FIMI)	4
Italian Albums (Musica e dischi)	6
Japanese Albums (Oricon)	49
Malaysian Albums (IFPI)	6
New Zealand Albums (RMNZ)	1
Norwegian Albums (VG-lista)	4
Portuguese Albums (AFP)	3
Scottish Albums (Official Charts)	3
Singapore Albums (SPVA)	3
Swedish Albums (Sverigetopplistan)	1
Swiss Albums (Schweizer Hitparade)	8
Taiwanese International Albums (IFPI)	3
UK Albums (Official Charts)	2
US Billboard 200	3
Zimbabwean Albums (ZIMA)	1

Chart (2000)	Peak position
Irish Albums (IRMA)	60

Chart (2023)	Peak position
UK Vinyl Albums	16

=== Year-end charts ===
Chart (1997)	Position
Australian Albums (ARIA)	1
New Zealand Albums (RMNZ)	6

Chart (1998)	Position
Australian Albums (ARIA)	60
Austrian Albums (Ö3 Austria)	43
Belgian Albums (Ultratop Flanders)	99
European Albums (Music & Media)	13
German Albums (Offizielle Top 100)	27
New Zealand Albums (RMNZ)	27
Swiss Albums (Schweizer Hitparade)	18
UK Albums (OCC)	16
US Billboard 200	9

Chart (1999)	Position
UK Albums (OCC)	84

=== Decade-end charts ===
Chart (1990–99)	Position
US Billboard 200	70

== Certifications and sales ==
Region	Certification	Certified units/sales
Australia (ARIA)	12× Platinum	890,000
Belgium (BRMA)	Gold	25,000^{*}
Canada (Music Canada)	Diamond	1,000,000^{^}
Central America (CFC)	Gold	
Czech Republic	Gold	25,000
Denmark (IFPI Danmark)	Platinum	50,000^{^}
Finland (Musiikkituottajat)	Platinum	61,138
France (SNEP)	2× Gold	200,000^{*}
Germany (BVMI)	Gold	250,000^{^}
Greece (IFPI Greece)	Gold	30,000^{^}
Hong Kong (IFPI Hong Kong)	Platinum	20,000^{*}
India	Platinum	20,000
Indonesia	Platinum	50,000
Italy (FIMI)	Platinum	100,000^{*}
Japan (RIAJ)	Gold	100,000^{^}
Malaysia	Platinum	25,000
Mexico (AMPROFON)	Gold	100,000^{^}
New Zealand (RMNZ)	Platinum	15,000^{^}
Norway (IFPI Norway)	Platinum	50,000^{*}
Philippines (PARI)	Platinum	40,000^{*}
Portugal (AFP)	Platinum	40,000^{^}
Singapore (RIAS)	Platinum	15,000^{*}
South Africa (RISA)	Platinum	50,000^{*}
Spain (Promusicae)	Gold	50,000^{^}
Sweden (GLF)	2× Platinum	160,000^{^}
Switzerland (IFPI Switzerland)	Platinum	50,000^{^}
Taiwan (RIT)	Platinum	50,000^{*}
Thailand	Platinum	40,000
United Kingdom (BPI)	3× Platinum	900,000^{*}
United States (RIAA)	7× Platinum	7,000,000^{^}
Summaries
Europe (IFPI)	2× Platinum	2,000,000^{*}
^{*} Sales figures based on certification alone.^{^} Shipments figures based on certification alone.

== See also ==
- List of best-selling albums in Australia
