= Charles Fisher (producer) =

Australian record producer

Charles Fisher is an Australian record producer, often referred to as "The Song Doctor." He is widely known as the producer of Savage Garden's eponymous album which yielded 10 ARIAs (including Producer of the Year, Engineer of the Year and a Special Achievement Award for himself) in 1997. "I Want You", a single from the aforementioned album also won a Channel V award in India. He has also worked with Radio Birdman, Air Supply, Hoodoo Gurus, Olivia Newton-John, Gyan, Moving Pictures, 1927, Electric Pandas, Detective Red, Soul Decision, The Radiators, The Seekers, Deep Blue Something and Ace of Base.

In the mid-1970s, Fisher opened the famed Trafalgar Recording Studios in Sydney's inner south-western suburbs. The studio became one of Australia's premier independent recording facilities, recording & producing acts through the 1970s and 1980s such as Marcia Hines, Midnight Oil, INXS, Cold Chisel, Skyhooks, Sherbet, Radio Birdman, Moving Pictures, Martin Plaza, Hoodoo Gurus, as well as international acts such as the Police, Elvis Costello, and Syrius.

Notably, the Moving Pictures song "What About Me" likely would never have been recorded if it had not been for Fisher suggesting they record it when he heard them tinkering with the tune.

At the ARIA Music Awards of 1997, he won Producer of the Year.

Still active as a Producer, Fisher, in 2015, produced The Celtic Tenors in Kells, Ireland, and Tor+ Saksit in Bangkok, where Saksit's third single went to No.1 on the iTunes chart and has to date in excess of 24 million YouTube views.

As of 2020, he featured in Australian television on a show called The Recording Studio.

== Discography ==
- Greg Sneddon: Mind Stroll (1974)
- Southern Cross: Southern Cross (1976)
- Radio Birdman: Burn My Eye (extended play, 1976)
- Ol'55: Take It Greasy (1976)
- Radio Birdman: Radios Appear (1977)
- various artists: F.J. Holden (soundtrack, 1977)
- Ray Burton: Dreamers and Nightflyers (1978)
- Ol'55: Crusin' for a Brusin' (1978)
- Aliens: Translator (1980)
- Dennis Wilson: Walking on Thin Ice (1980)
- Radiators: Feel the Heat (1980)
- Air Supply: Lost in Love (1980)
- Radiators: You Have the Right... (1981)
- New Race: The First and the Last (1982)
- Moving Pictures: Days of Innocence (1982)
- The Expression: The Expression (1983)
- Moving Pictures: Matinee (1983)
- Angie Pepper: "Frozen World" (single, 1984)
- Robert Frost: (single, 1984)
- Jon English/Renee Geyer: "Every Beat of My Heart" (track, 1984)
- QED: "This One" (single, 1984)
- Detective Red: "The Rule" (single, 1984)
- DD Smash: The Optimist (album, 1984)
- The Visitors: The Visitors (1985)
- Electric Pandas: "Italian Boys" (single, 1985)
- James Reyne and Lin Buckfield: "R.O.C.K." (single, 1985)
- Hoodoo Gurus: Mars Needs Guitars (1985)
- Mark Edwards: Land of the Living (1986)
- Mental As Anything: "Sloppy Croc" (single, 1986)
- Martin Plaza: Plaza Suite (1986)
- Tango Bravo: "Blood Is the Colour" (single, 1986)
- The Cockroaches: The Cockroaches (1987)
- Chris Morrow: "Just What I Needed" (single, 1987)
- Jump Back Band: Jump Back Band (EP, 1987)
- Pardon Me Boys: Pardon Me Boys (1987)
- Radio Birdman: More Fun! (EP, 1988)
- Cockroaches: Fingertips (1988)
- 1927: ...ish (1989)
- Gyan: Gyan (1989)
- 1927: The Other Side (1990)
- Among Thieves: Faith in Love (1991)
- Gyan: Reddest Red (1992)
- Margot Smith: Sleeping with the Lion (1993)
- Hoodoo Gurus: Blue Cave (1996)
- Savage Garden: Savage Garden (1997)
- Jimmy Barnes: Never Give You Up (1997)
- The Seekers: Future Road (1997)
- Invertigo: Forum (2001)
- Glenn Bidmead: Seven Seconds (2001)
- Dan Greenwood: This Is the Girl (2002)
- Olivia Newton-John: Duets (2003)

Credits: AllMusic, Australian Rock Database

== Awards and nominations ==
=== Countdown Australian Music Awards ===
Countdown was an Australian pop music TV series on national broadcaster ABC-TV from 1974 to 1987, it presented music awards from 1979 to 1987, initially in conjunction with magazine TV Week. The TV Week / Countdown Awards were a combination of popular-voted and peer-voted awards.

Year	Nominee / work	Award	Result
1984	himself	Best Producer	Nominated
1986	himself	Best Producer	Nominated

=== MPEG Awards ===
The Music Producer and Engineers' Guild (MPEG Awards) Awards celebrate excellence in music production and engineering in Australia. They commenced in 2024.

Year	Nominee / work	Award	Result	Ref.
2024	Charles Fisher	Lifetime Achievement Award	awarded	
