= Daniel Jones (musician) =

Australian musician and producer (born 1973)

- Born: 22 July 1973 (age 53); Southend-on-Sea, Essex, England
- Occupations: Musician; songwriter; guitarist; producer; property developer
- Years active: 1986–2005
- Spouse: Kathleen de Leon (m. 2005)
- Children: 2
- Musical career
- Origin: Brisbane, Queensland, Australia
- Genres: Pop; rock; pop rock; soft rock
- Instruments: Guitar; keyboard; piano; synthesizer
- Labels: Roadshow; Columbia; Meridien Musik
- Formerly of: Red Edge; Savage Garden
- Website: level7studios.com.au

Daniel Jones (born 22 July 1973) is an English-Australian musician, songwriter, record producer, and property developer. He was a member of the pop duo Savage Garden, whose international hit singles included "I Want You", "To the Moon and Back", "Truly Madly Deeply", "I Knew I Loved You", and "Crash and Burn".

== Early life ==
Daniel Jones was born on 22 July 1973 in Southend-on-Sea, Essex, England, the youngest of three boys. When he was a year old, his family moved to Brisbane, Queensland, Australia.

== Career ==
=== Early work ===
In 1993, Jones was playing in a cover band named Red Edge in Brisbane that needed a vocalist. He placed an ad in a local newspaper, and the band eventually hired Darren Hayes for the position. The two left the group in 1994 and began writing music together, eventually becoming known as Savage Garden.

=== Savage Garden ===
According to the credits on their albums, Hayes handled lead vocals and arrangements, while Jones played guitar, keyboard, and sang backing vocals. They wrote their songs together. Savage Garden released two successful albums, Savage Garden (1997) and Affirmation (1999), before breaking up in 2001, largely due to Jones's distaste for touring and fame.

=== Subsequent work ===
After leaving Savage Garden, Jones built his own recording studio and launched the music label Meridien Musik. The label's first act was the pop duo Aneiki.

Around 2010, Jones left the music industry, moved to Las Vegas, and bought, renovated, and sold properties with a small team. He returned to live in Australia in 2023.

== Personal life ==
In 2000, Jones met Kathleen de Leon, an original member of the children's musical group Hi-5, at the 42nd Annual TV Week Logie Awards. Jones proposed to de Leon on his 30th birthday at the GPO Bar in Brisbane. The couple wed on 9 October 2005. They have two children.

== Awards and nominations ==
=== APRA Awards ===
The Australasian Performing Right Association awards were established by APRA in 1982 to honour the achievements of songwriters and music composers.

Year	Nominee / work	Award	Result	Ref.
1998	"To the Moon and Back" (Darren Hayes & Daniel Jones)	Song of the Year	Nominated	
1998	"To the Moon and Back" (Darren Hayes & Daniel Jones)	Most Performed Australian Work	Nominated	
1998	"Truly Madly Deeply" (Darren Hayes & Daniel Jones)	Song of the Year	Nominated	
1998	"Truly Madly Deeply" (Darren Hayes & Daniel Jones)	Most Performed Australian Work	Nominated	
1998	Darren Hayes and Daniel Jones	Songwriter of the Year	Won	
1998	"I Want You" (Darren Hayes & Daniel Jones)	Most Performed Australian Work Overseas	Won	
1999	"Truly Madly Deeply" (Darren Hayes & Daniel Jones)	Most Performed Australian Work Overseas	Won	
2000	"Truly Madly Deeply" (Darren Hayes & Daniel Jones)	Most Performed Australian Work Overseas	Won	
2000	"I Knew I Loved You" (Darren Hayes & Daniel Jones)	Song of the Year	Nominated	
2000	"I Knew I Loved You" (Darren Hayes & Daniel Jones)	Most Performed Australian Work	Nominated	
2000	"The Animal Song" (Darren Hayes & Daniel Jones)	Most Performed Australian Work	Won	
2000	Darren Hayes and Daniel Jones	Songwriter of the Year	Won	
2001	"I Knew I Loved You" (Darren Hayes & Daniel Jones)	Most Performed Australian Work Overseas	Won	
2001	"Affirmation" (Darren Hayes & Daniel Jones)	Most Performed Australian Work	Nominated	
2001	"Crash and Burn" (Darren Hayes & Daniel Jones)	Most Performed Australian Work	Nominated	
2002	"Hold Me" (Darren Hayes & Daniel Jones)	Most Performed Australian Work	Won	
2002	"Crash and Burn" (Darren Hayes & Daniel Jones)	Most Performed Australian Work Overseas	Won	
2003	"I Knew I Loved You" (Darren Hayes & Daniel Jones)	Most Performed Australian Work Overseas	Won	
2005	"Truly Madly Deeply" (Darren Hayes & Daniel Jones)	Most Performed Australian Work Overseas	Nominated	

=== ARIA Awards ===
The ARIA Music Awards have been presented by the Australian Record Industry Association since 1987.

Year	Nominee / work	Award	Result	Ref.
2000	Affirmation	Producer of the Year	Nominated	
