= Lawson discography =

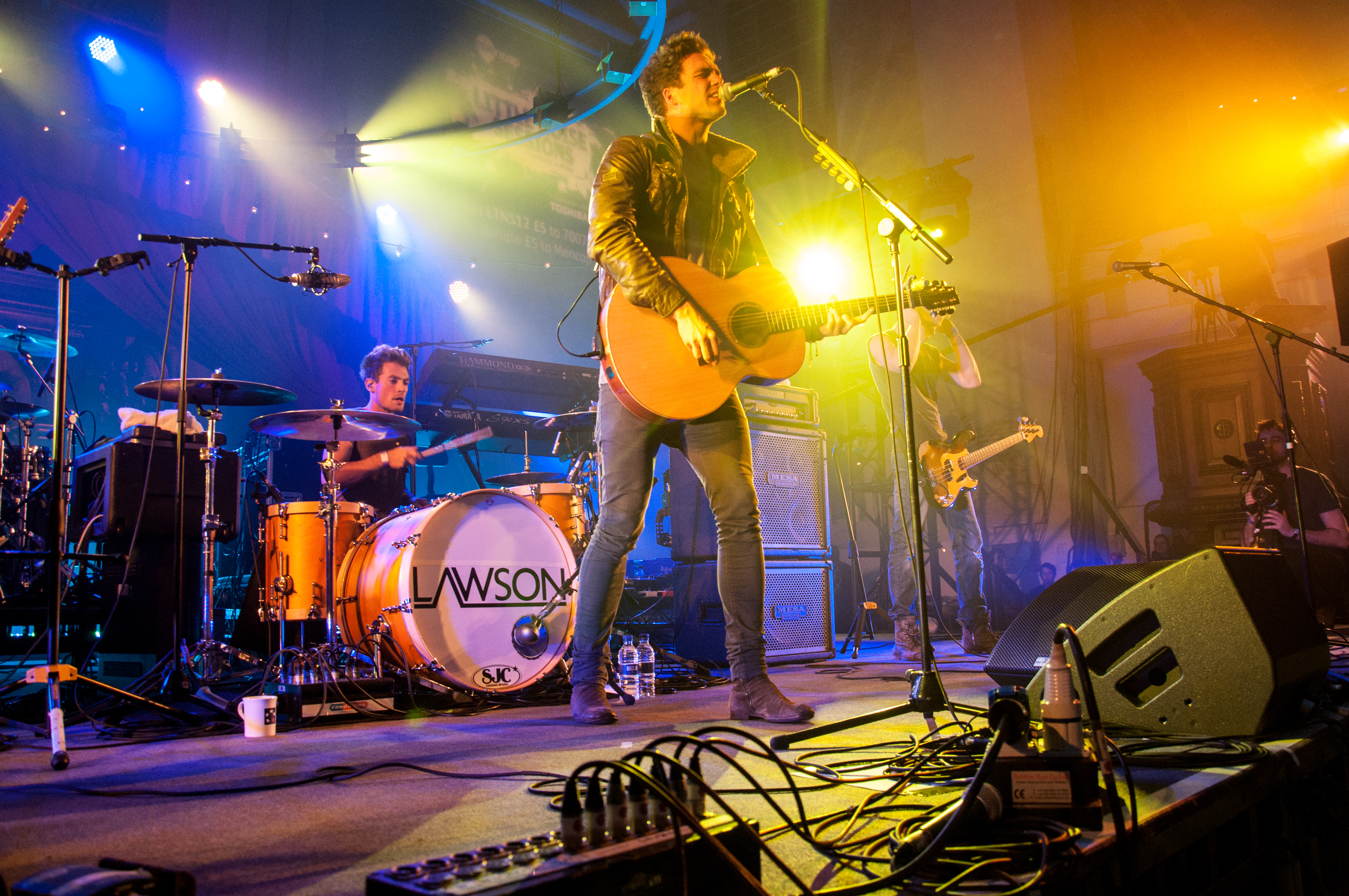
- Studio albums: 2
- EPs: 2
- Singles: 14
- Music videos: 12

The discography page of Lawson, an English pop rock band, consisting of Andy Brown (lead vocals, guitar), Ryan Fletcher (bass guitar, backing vocals), Joel Peat (lead guitar, backing vocals) and Adam Pitts (drums, backing vocals). Their debut studio album, Chapman Square, was released in October 2012, peaking at number four on the UK Albums Chart. The album includes the singles "When She Was Mine", "Taking Over Me", "Standing in the Dark", "Learn to Love Again". They re-released the album in the autumn of 2013 as Chapman Square Chapter II, the album includes the singles "Brokenhearted" and "Juliet". Their second studio album, Perspective, was released in July 2016, peaking at number twenty-three on the UK Albums Chart. The album includes the singles "Roads", "Under the Sun", "Money" and "Where My Love Goes".

== Studio albums ==
| Title | Details | Peak chart positions | | | Certifications |
| Title | Details | UK | IRL | SCO | Certifications |
|---|---|---|---|---|---|
| Chapman Square | Released: 22 October 2012; Label: Polydor, Global Talent; Formats: CD, digital download | 4 | 23 | 4 | BPI: Gold |
| Perspective | Released: 8 July 2016; Label: Polydor, Global Talent; Formats: CD, digital download | 23 | — | 13 | |

== Extended plays ==
| Title | Details | Peak chart positions |
| Title | Details | AUS |
|---|---|---|
| iTunes Festival: London 2013 | Released: 2013; Label: Global Talent, Polydor; Format: Digital download | — |
| Lawson | Released: 2 October 2015; Label: Polydor; Format: Digital download, CD | 76 |

== Singles ==
=== As lead artist ===
| Title | Year | Peak chart positions | | | | | Certifications | Album |
| Title | Year | UK | IRL | HUN | POL | SCO | Certifications | Album |
|---|---|---|---|---|---|---|---|---|
| "When She Was Mine" | 2012 | 4 | 46 | — | — | 4 | | Chapman Square |
| "Taking Over Me" | 2012 | 3 | 32 | 39 | — | 3 | | Chapman Square |
| "Standing in the Dark" | 2012 | 6 | 50 | — | — | 5 | BPI: Silver | Chapman Square |
| "Learn to Love Again" | 2012 | 13 | 50 | — | — | 11 | | Chapman Square |
| "Brokenhearted" (featuring B.o.B) | 2013 | 6 | 12 | 40 | — | 5 | | Chapman Square – Chapter II |
| "Juliet" | 2013 | 3 | 32 | — | 3 | 3 | BPI: Silver | Chapman Square – Chapter II |
| "Roads" (Note: "Roads" and "Under the Sun" also appear on their EP Lawson) | 2015 | 11 | — | — | — | 4 | | Perspective |
| "Under the Sun" | 2015 | — | — | — | — | — | | Perspective |
| "Money" | 2016 | — | — | — | — | — | | Perspective |
| "Where My Love Goes" | 2016 | — | — | — | — | 92 | | Perspective |
| "Lovers" | 2020 | — (Note: "Lovers" did not enter the Official Singles Chart, but peaked at number ninety-five on the Official Singles Downloads Chart.) | — | — | — | — | | TBA |
| "Animals" | 2020 | — | — | — | — | — | | TBA |
| "She Don’t Even Know" | 2020 | — | — | — | — | — | | TBA |
| "Four Letters" | 2020 | — | — | — | — | — | | TBA |
"—" denotes single that did not chart or was not released.

=== Promotional singles ===
| Title | Year | Album |
|---|---|---|
| "Love Is You" | 2015 | Perspective |
| "We Are Kings" | 2015 | Lawson |

== Music videos ==
| Title | Year | Director |
|---|---|---|
| "When She Was Mine" | 2012 | Declan Whitebloom |
| "Taking Over Me" | 2012 | Josh Forbes |
| "Standing in the Dark" | 2012 | Nick Bartleet |
| "Learn To Love Again" | 2012 | Shane Drake |
| "Brokenhearted" (featuring B.o.B) | 2013 | Declan Whitebloom |
| "Juliet" | 2013 | Carly Cussen |
| "Roads" | 2015 | James Slater |
| "Under the Sun" | 2015 | Embryo |
| "We Are Kings" | 2015 | Embryo |
| "Money" | 2016 | Carly Cussen |
| "Where My Love Goes" | 2016 | Mike Baldwin |
| "Lovers" | 2020 | Adam Pitts |
