= List of UK top-ten singles in 2012 =

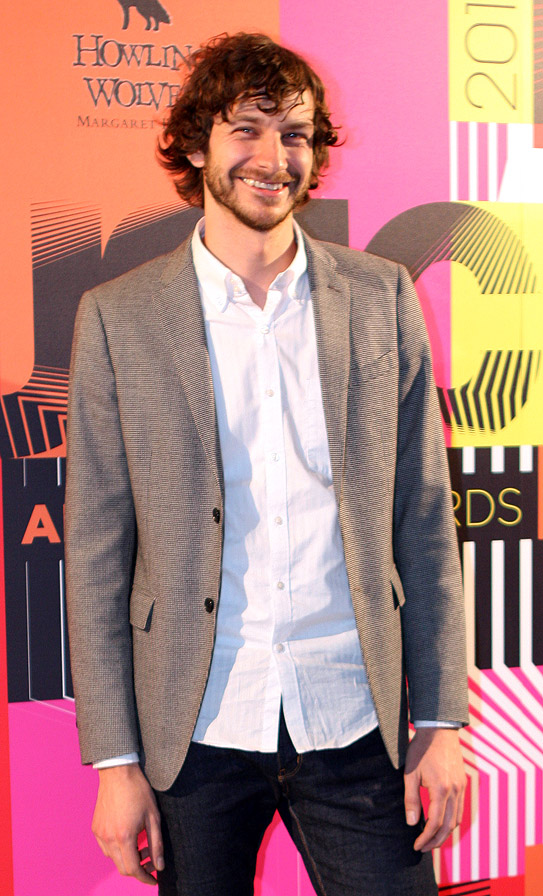
Gotye had the best-selling single of 2012 with "Somebody That I Used to Know", featuring guest vocals from Kimbra, which spent five weeks at number-one and lasted 18 weeks in the top 10. Despite the song's success, Gotye never made the UK charts again, with critics labelling him a one-hit wonder.

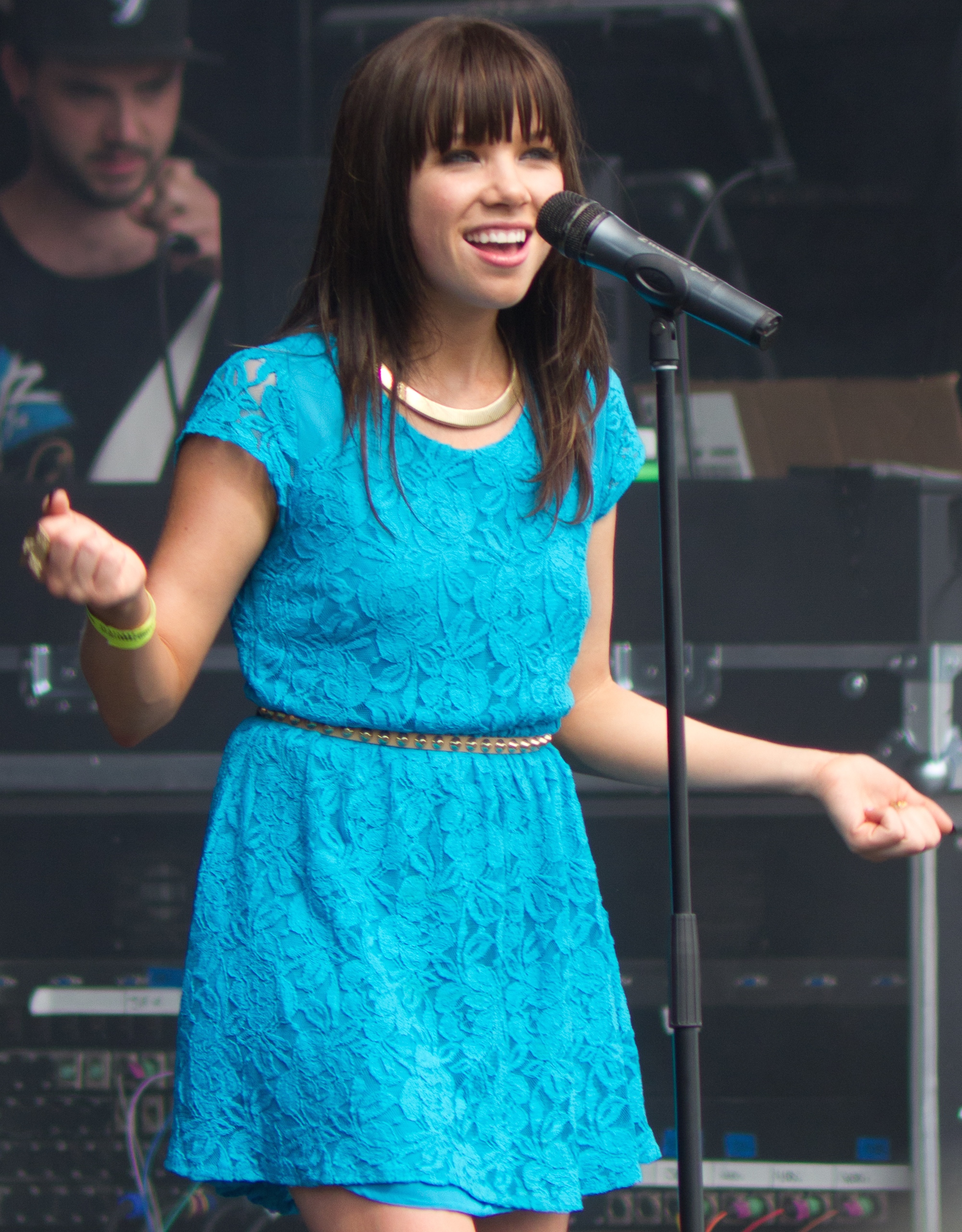
Carly Rae Jepsen had the year's second best selling single with "Call Me Maybe", which spent four weeks at number-one and lasted 12 weeks in the top 10.

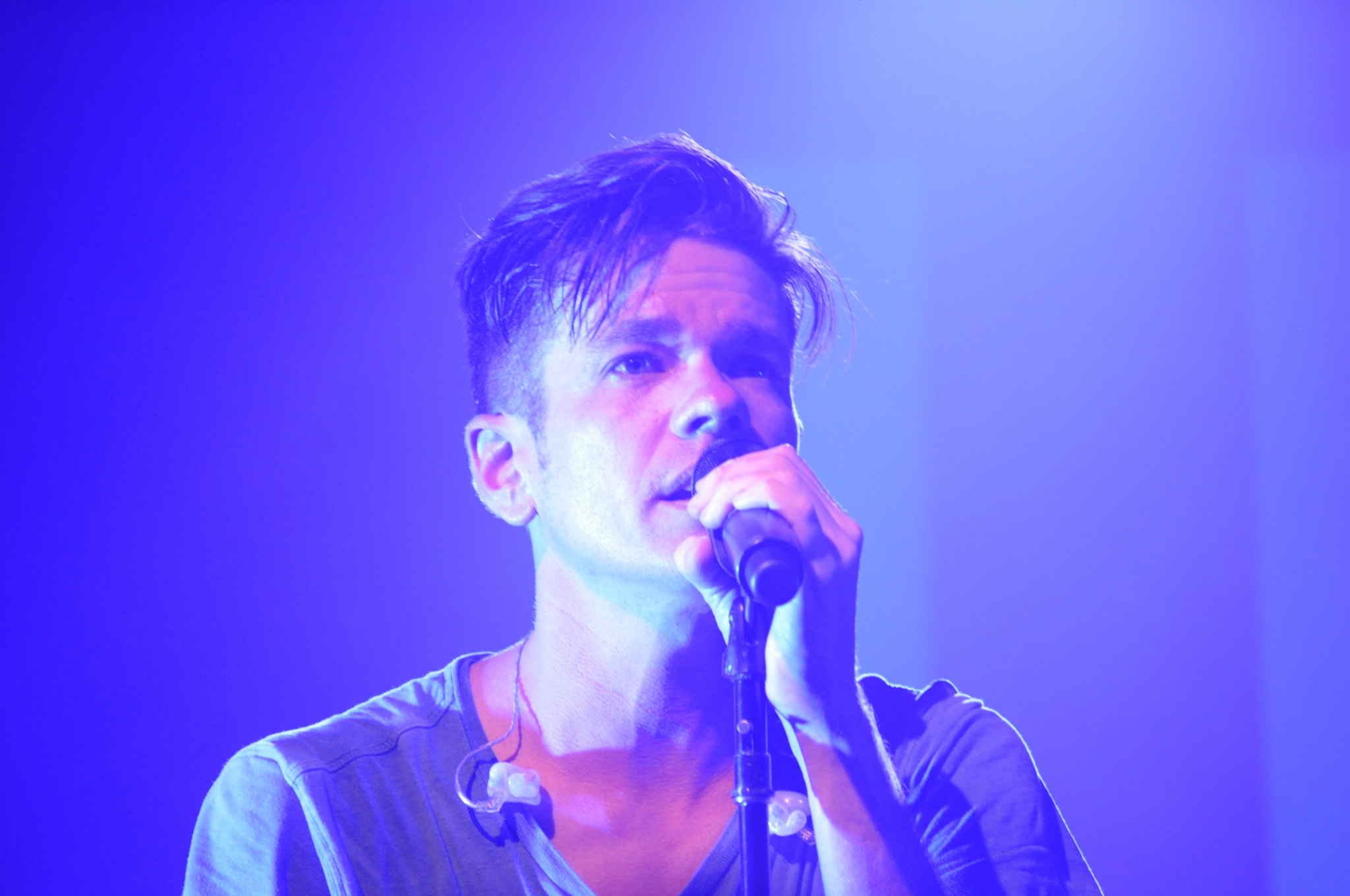
Nate Ruess and his band Fun had two singles in the UK top 10 in 2012, including chart-topper "We Are Young", a collaboration with Janelle Monáe, which became the third best seller of the year.

The UK Singles Chart is one of many music charts compiled by the Official Charts Company that calculates the best-selling singles of the week in the United Kingdom. Since 2004 the chart has been based on the sales of both physical singles and digital downloads, with airplay figures excluded from the official chart. This list shows singles that peaked in the Top 10 of the UK Singles Chart during 2012, as well as singles which peaked in 2011 and 2013 but were in the top 10 in 2012. The entry date is when the song appeared in the top 10 for the first time (week ending, as published by the Official Charts Company, which is six days after the chart is announced).

One-hundred and forty-four singles were in the top ten in 2012. Eleven singles from 2011 remained in the top 10 for several weeks at the beginning of the year, while "Scream & Shout" by will.i.am & Britney Spears and "I Knew You Were Trouble" by Taylor Swift were released in 2012 but did not reach their peak until 2013. "Good Feeling" by Flo Rida and "Paradise" by Coldplay were the singles from 2011 to reach their peak in 2012. Forty-six artists scored multiple entries in the top 10 in 2012.

The first number-one single of the year was "Paradise" by Coldplay. Overall, thirty-six different singles peaked at number-one in 2012, with Rita Ora (3) having the most singles hit that position.

== Background ==
=== Multiple entries ===
One-hundred and forty-four singles charted in the top 10 in 2012, with one-hundred and thirty-three singles reaching their peak this year.

Forty-six artists scored multiple entries in the top 10 in 2012. American rapper Flo Rida and Barbadian singer Rihanna shared the highest number of top ten singles in 2012 with five. Flo Rida recorded one solo single which reached the top spot – "Good Feeling" - and also featured on Olly Murs number-one single "Troublemaker". His other top ten entries were "Wild Ones" featuring Sia (number 4), "Whistle" (2) and "I Cry" (3). Rihanna had number-ones with "We Found Love" featuring Calvin Harris (released in 2011) and "Diamonds", and also charted in 2012 with "Where Have You Been" (6), "Stay" featuring Mikky Ekko (4) and a guest appearance on Coldplay's "Princess of China", which reached number four. Scottish DJ Calvin Harris, singers Emeli Sande and Rita Ora, will.i.am from the Black Eyed Peas and French DJ David Guetta all had four top ten singles in 2012.

=== Chart debuts ===
Thirty-nine artists achieved their first top 10 single in 2012, either as a lead or featured artist. Of these, four went on to record another hit single that year: Carly Rae Jepsen, Fun, Paloma Faith and Stooshe. Two artists scored two more top 10 singles: Conor Maynard and Lawson. Rita Ora had three other entries in her breakthrough year.

The following table (collapsed) does not include acts who had previously charted as part of a group and secured their first top 10 solo single.

Artist	Number of top 10s	First entry	Chart position	Other entries
Knife Party	1	"Antidote"	4	—
Gotye	1	"Somebody That I Used to Know"	1	—
Kimbra	1	"Somebody That I Used to Know"	1	—
Alyssa Reid	1	"Alone Again"	2	—
Jump Smokers	1	"Alone Again"	2	—
Rita Ora	4	"Hot Right Now"	1	"R.I.P." (1), "How We Do (Party)" (1), "Shine Ya Light" (10)
Neon Hitch	1	"Ass Back Home"	9	—
Stooshe	2	"Love Me"	5	"Black Heart" (3)
Erick Morillo	1	"Elephant"	3	—
Carly Rae Jepsen	2	"Call Me Maybe"	1	"Good Time" (5)
Fun	2	"We Are Young"	1	"Some Nights" (7)
Janelle Monáe	1	"We Are Young"	1	—
Conor Maynard	3	"Can't Say No"	2	"Vegas Girl" (4), "Turn Around" (8)
John Legend	1	"Ordinary People"	4	—
Alex Clare	1	"Too Close"	4	—
D'banj	1	"Oliver Twist"	9	—
Paloma Faith	2	"Picking Up the Pieces"	7	"He Ain't Heavy, He's My Brother" (1)
Rudimental	1	"Feel the Love"	1	—
John Newman	1	"Feel the Love"	1	—
Loreen	1	"Euphoria"	3	—
Lawson	3	"When She Was Mine"	4	"Taking Over Me" (3), "Standing in the Dark" (6)
The Commonwealth Band	1	"Sing"	1	—
Precision Tunes	1	"Payphone"	9	—
Eva Simons	1	"This Is Love"	1	—
Karmin	1	"Brokenhearted"	6	—
Ms D	1	"Heatwave"	1	—
Redlight	1	"Lost in Your Love"	5	—
Elbow	1	"One Day Like This"	4	—
Trey Songz	1	"Simply Amazing"	8	—
Porter Robinson	1	"Language"	9	—
Sam and the Womp	1	"Bom Bom"	1	—
Devlin	1	"Watchtower"	7	—
Psy	1	"Gangnam Style"	1	—
John Martin	1	"Don't You Worry Child"	1	—
Childish Gambino	1	"Trouble"	7	—
Gabrielle Aplin	1	"The Power of Love"	1	—
The Lumineers	1	"Ho Hey"	8	—
James Arthur	1	"Impossible"	1	—
The Justice Collective	1	"He Ain't Heavy, He's My Brother"	1	—

=== Songs from films ===
Original songs from various films entered the top 10 throughout the year. These included "Skyfall" (from Skyfall), "Ill Manors" (from Ill Manors) and "Wide Awake" (Katy Perry: Part of Me).

=== Charity singles ===
A number of singles recorded for charity reached the top 10 in the charts in 2012. The Sport Relief single was "Proud", recorded by former X Factor finalists JLS, peaking at number six on 31 March 2012.

Girls Aloud recorded the Children in Need single for 2012, entitled "Something New". It was the 21st top ten single of their career out of their twenty-two singles, a run only broken by previous release "Untouchable" (which reached number 11), peaking at number two on 1 December 2012.

A group of artists under the banner Justice Collective produced a cover of "He Ain't Heavy, He's My Brother" (originally by The Hollies) to raise money for charities connected to the Hillsborough Disaster. It became the Christmas number one for that year, replacing James Arthur at the top spot on 29 December 2012.

=== Best-selling singles ===
Gotye featuring Kimbra had the best-selling single of the year with "Somebody That I Used to Know". The song spent eighteen weeks in the top 10 (including five weeks at number one), sold over 1.318 million copies and was certified 2× platinum by the BPI (July 2013). "Call Me Maybe" by Carly Rae Jepsen came in second place, selling more than 1.142 million copies and losing out by around 176,000 sales. Fun featuring Janelle Monáe's "We Are Young, "Titanium" from David Guetta featuring Sia and "Impossible" by James Arthur made up the top five. Singles by Psy, Nicki Minaj, Jessie J, Maroon 5 featuring Wiz Khalifa and Flo Rida featuring Sia were also in the top ten best-selling singles of the year.

== Top-ten singles ==
Key

Symbol	Meaning
‡	Single peaked in 2011 but still in chart in 2012.
♦	Single released in 2012 but peaked in 2013.
(#)	Year-end top-ten single position and rank
Entered	The date that the single first appeared in the chart.
Peak	Highest position that the single reached in the UK Singles Chart.

Entered (week ending)	Weeks in top 10	Single	Artist	Peak	Peak reached (week ending)	Weeks at peak
Singles in 2011
15 October 2011	14	"We Found Love" ‡	Rihanna featuring Calvin Harris	1	15 October 2011	6
15 October 2011	7	"Sexy and I Know It" ‡ ^{[A]}	LMFAO	5	22 October 2011	1
5 November 2011	9	"Earthquake" ‡ ^{[A]}	Labrinth featuring Tinie Tempah	2	5 November 2011	1
12 November 2011	8	"Lego House" ‡ ^{[A]}	Ed Sheeran	5	19 November 2011	2
26 November 2011	11	"Good Feeling"	Flo Rida	1	14 January 2012	1
3 December 2011	8	"Dance with Me Tonight" ‡	Olly Murs	1	17 December 2011	1
3 December 2011	8	"Levels" ‡ ^{[B]}	Avicii	4	3 December 2011	3
17 December 2011	6	"Dedication to My Ex (Miss That)" ‡ ^{[B]}	Lloyd featuring André 3000 & Lil Wayne	3	17 December 2011	1
17 December 2011	7	"Paradise"	Coldplay	1	7 January 2012	1
24 December 2011	3	"Cannonball" ‡	Little Mix	1	24 December 2011	1
31 December 2011	2	"Wherever You Are" ‡	Military Wives featuring Gareth Malone	1	31 December 2011	1
Singles in 2012
7 January 2012	7	"Mama Do the Hump"	Rizzle Kicks	2	28 January 2012	1
14 January 2012	3	"Troublemaker"	Taio Cruz	3	14 January 2012	1
14 January 2012	9	"Domino" (#8)	Jessie J	1	21 January 2012	2
21 January 2012	13	"Titanium" (#4)	David Guetta featuring Sia	1	11 February 2012	1
28 January 2012	2	"Antidote"	Swedish House Mafia vs. Knife Party	4	28 January 2012	1
28 January 2012	1	"Kiss the Stars"	Pixie Lott	8	28 January 2012	1
4 February 2012	4	"Twilight"	Cover Drive	1	4 February 2012	1
4 February 2012	12	"Wild Ones" (#10)	Flo Rida featuring Sia	4	4 February 2012	3
4 February 2012	18	"Somebody That I Used to Know" (#1)	Gotye featuring Kimbra	1	18 February 2012	5
4 February 2012	4	"Stronger (What Doesn't Kill You)" ^{[C]}	Kelly Clarkson	8	4 February 2012	3
4 February 2012	2	"International Love"	Pitbull featuring Chris Brown	10	4 February 2012	2
11 February 2012	3	"Alone Again"	Alyssa Reid featuring Jump Smokers	2	11 February 2012	1
11 February 2012	2	"Born to Die"	Lana Del Rey	9	11 February 2012	1
18 February 2012	3	"T.H.E. (The Hardest Ever)"	will.i.am featuring Jennifer Lopez & Mick Jagger	3	18 February 2012	1
25 February 2012	5	"Hot Right Now"	DJ Fresh featuring Rita Ora	1	25 February 2012	1
25 February 2012	8	"Next to Me"	Emeli Sandé	2	25 February 2012	3
25 February 2012	1	"One Thing"	One Direction	9	25 February 2012	1
3 March 2012	11	"Starships" (#7)	Nicki Minaj	2	24 March 2012	1
3 March 2012	4	"Turn Me On" ^{[D]}	David Guetta featuring Nicki Minaj	8	3 March 2012	2
3 March 2012	1	"Ass Back Home"	Gym Class Heroes featuring Neon Hitch	9	3 March 2012	1
10 March 2012	1	"Rockstar"	Dappy featuring Brian May	2	10 March 2012	1
10 March 2012	1	"Drunk"	Ed Sheeran	9	10 March 2012	1
17 March 2012	2	"Love Me"	Stooshe featuring Travie McCoy	5	17 March 2012	1
17 March 2012	1	"Bright Lights"	Tinchy Stryder featuring Pixie Lott	7	17 March 2012	1
17 March 2012	1	"Seven Nation Army"	Marcus Collins	9	17 March 2012	1
24 March 2012	1	"Elephant"	Alexandra Burke featuring Erick Morillo	3	24 March 2012	1
24 March 2012	1	"Niggas in Paris"	Jay-Z & Kanye West	10	24 March 2012	1
31 March 2012	3	"Part of Me"	Katy Perry	1	31 March 2012	1
31 March 2012	5	"She Doesn't Mind"	Sean Paul	2	31 March 2012	3
31 March 2012	3	"Last Time"	Labrinth	4	31 March 2012	1
31 March 2012	1	"Proud" ^{[GG]}	JLS	6	31 March 2012	1
7 April 2012	3	"Turn Up the Music"	Chris Brown	1	7 April 2012	1
7 April 2012	1	"Ill Manors"	Plan B	6	7 April 2012	1
14 April 2012	12	"Call Me Maybe" (#2)	Carly Rae Jepsen	1	14 April 2012	4
21 April 2012	2	"Boyfriend"	Justin Bieber	2	21 April 2012	1
21 April 2012	1	"Climax"	Usher	4	21 April 2012	1
21 April 2012	14	"We Are Young" (#3) ^{[F]}	Fun featuring Janelle Monáe	1	2 June 2012	1
21 April 2012	1	"Level Up"	Sway	8	21 April 2012	1
28 April 2012	2	"Can't Say No"	Conor Maynard	2	28 April 2012	1
28 April 2012	1	"Ordinary People"	John Legend	4	28 April 2012	1
28 April 2012	4	"Laserlight"	Jessie J featuring David Guetta	5	28 April 2012	2
28 April 2012	2	"So Good"	B.o.B	7	28 April 2012	1
5 May 2012	2	"Let's Go"	Calvin Harris featuring Ne-Yo	2	5 May 2012	1
5 May 2012	7	"Too Close"	Alex Clare	4	19 May 2012	2
5 May 2012	6	"Drive By"	Train	6	19 May 2012	1
12 May 2012	4	"Young"	Tulisa	1	12 May 2012	1
12 May 2012	1	"Sparks"	Cover Drive	4	12 May 2012	1
19 May 2012	4	"R.I.P."	Rita Ora featuring Tinie Tempah	1	19 May 2012	2
19 May 2012	1	"Live My Life"	Far East Movement featuring Justin Bieber	7	19 May 2012	1
19 May 2012	5	"Where Have You Been"	Rihanna	6	26 May 2012	3
26 May 2012	1	"30 Days"	The Saturdays	7	26 May 2012	1
26 May 2012	1	"Oliver Twist"	D'banj	9	26 May 2012	1
2 June 2012	2	"Chasing the Sun"	The Wanted	2	2 June 2012	1
2 June 2012	2	"Picking Up the Pieces" ^{[E]}	Paloma Faith	7	2 June 2012	1
9 June 2012	11	"Feel the Love"	Rudimental featuring John Newman	1	9 June 2012	1
9 June 2012	1	"Euphoria"	Loreen	3	9 June 2012	1
9 June 2012	1	"When She Was Mine"	Lawson	4	9 June 2012	1
16 June 2012	2	"Sing"	Gary Barlow & The Commonwealth Band featuring Military Wives	1	16 June 2012	1
16 June 2012	9	"Whistle"	Flo Rida	2	16 June 2012	2
16 June 2012	3	"Scream"	Usher	5	16 June 2012	1
16 June 2012	2	"The Power"	DJ Fresh featuring Dizzee Rascal	6	16 June 2012	1
16 June 2012	7	"Princess of China"	Coldplay & Rihanna	4	23 June 2012	1
23 June 2012	4	"Call My Name"	Cheryl	1	23 June 2012	1
23 June 2012	1	"Payphone"	Precision Tunes	9	23 June 2012	1
30 June 2012	8	"Payphone" (#9)	Maroon 5 featuring Wiz Khalifa	1	30 June 2012	2
30 June 2012	8	"Black Heart"	Stooshe	3	4 August 2012	1
7 July 2012	5	"This Is Love"	will.i.am featuring Eva Simons	1	7 July 2012	1
7 July 2012	6	"Don't Wake Me Up"	Chris Brown	2	14 July 2012	1
7 July 2012	4	"Wide Awake"	Katy Perry	9	14 July 2012	2
21 July 2012	8	"Spectrum (Say My Name)"	Florence and the Machine	1	21 July 2012	3
21 July 2012	3	"Pound the Alarm" ^{[G]}	Nicki Minaj	8	18 August 2012	1
4 August 2012	2	"Vegas Girl"	Conor Maynard	4	4 August 2012	1
4 August 2012	3	"Brokenhearted"	Karmin	6	4 August 2012	2
11 August 2012	5	"Heatwave"	Wiley featuring Ms D	1	11 August 2012	2
11 August 2012	4	"We'll Be Coming Back"	Calvin Harris featuring Example	2	11 August 2012	2
18 August 2012	1	"Taking Over Me"	Lawson	3	18 August 2012	1
18 August 2012	2	"Lost in Your Love"	Redlight	5	18 August 2012	1
25 August 2012	4	"How We Do (Party)"	Rita Ora	1	25 August 2012	1
25 August 2012	3	"Read All About It, Pt. III"	Emeli Sandé	3	25 August 2012	1
25 August 2012	1	"One Day Like This"	Elbow	4	25 August 2012	1
25 August 2012	1	"Running Up That Hill (A Deal With God) (2012 Remix)" ^{[H]}	Kate Bush	6	25 August 2012	1
25 August 2012	2	"Simply Amazing"	Trey Songz	8	25 August 2012	1
25 August 2012	1	"Language"	Porter Robinson	9	25 August 2012	1
1 September 2012	4	"Bom Bom"	Sam and the Womp	1	1 September 2012	1
1 September 2012	10	"We Are Never Ever Getting Back Together" ^{[K]}	Taylor Swift	4	6 October 2012	1
1 September 2012	1	"Watchtower"	Devlin featuring Ed Sheeran	7	1 September 2012	1
1 September 2012	2	"Wonderful"	Angel	9	1 September 2012	1
8 September 2012	4	"Wings"	Little Mix	1	8 September 2012	1
8 September 2012	2	"Harder Than You Think" ^{[I]}	Public Enemy	4	8 September 2012	1
8 September 2012	4	"Good Time"	Owl City & Carly Rae Jepsen	5	8 September 2012	1
15 September 2012	4	"Let Me Love You (Until You Learn to Love Yourself)"	Ne-Yo	1	15 September 2012	1
15 September 2012	6	"Hall of Fame"	The Script featuring will.i.am	1	22 September 2012	2
15 September 2012	3	"Blow Me (One Last Kiss)"	Pink	3	15 September 2012	1
15 September 2012	3	"Some Nights" ^{[J]}	Fun	7	6 October 2012	1
22 September 2012	3	"You Bring Me Joy"	Amelia Lily	2	22 September 2012	1
22 September 2012	6	"I Cry"	Flo Rida	3	6 October 2012	1
29 September 2012	2	"Say Nothing"	Example	2	29 September 2012	1
29 September 2012	17	"Gangnam Style" (#6)	Psy	1	6 October 2012	1
6 October 2012	2	"She Wolf (Falling to Pieces)"	David Guetta featuring Sia	8	6 October 2012	2
6 October 2012	4	"Turn Around"	Conor Maynard featuring Ne-Yo	8	20 October 2012	1
13 October 2012	14	"Diamonds"	Rihanna	1	13 October 2012	1
13 October 2012	2	"Live While We're Young"	One Direction	3	13 October 2012	1
13 October 2012	6	"Skyfall"	Adele	2	20 October 2012	1
13 October 2012	2	"Anything Could Happen"	Ellie Goulding	5	13 October 2012	2
20 October 2012	6	"Don't You Worry Child" ^{[L]}	Swedish House Mafia featuring John Martin	1	20 October 2012	1
20 October 2012	1	"Trouble"	Leona Lewis featuring Childish Gambino	7	20 October 2012	1
27 October 2012	3	"Sweet Nothing"	Calvin Harris featuring Florence Welch	1	27 October 2012	1
27 October 2012	1	"Standing in the Dark"	Lawson	6	27 October 2012	1
27 October 2012	3	"One More Night"	Maroon 5	8	27 October 2012	2
3 November 2012	10	"Beneath Your Beautiful" ^{[M]}	Labrinth featuring Emeli Sandé	1	3 November 2012	1
3 November 2012	1	"Hottest Girl in the World"	JLS	6	3 November 2012	1
3 November 2012	1	"Wonder"	Naughty Boy featuring Emeli Sandé	10	3 November 2012	1
10 November 2012	6	"Candy" ^{[M]}	Robbie Williams	1	10 November 2012	2
10 November 2012	2	"Can You Hear Me? (Ayayaya)"	Wiley featuring Skepta, JME & Ms D	3	10 November 2012	1
17 November 2012	1	"I Found You"	The Wanted	3	17 November 2012	1
17 November 2012	1	"Do You Think of Me?"	Misha B	9	17 November 2012	1
17 November 2012	1	"Shine Ya Light"	Rita Ora	10	17 November 2012	1
24 November 2012	5	"Little Things"	One Direction	1	24 November 2012	1
24 November 2012	10	"Locked Out of Heaven"	Bruno Mars	2	24 November 2012	3
24 November 2012	1	"DNA"	Little Mix	3	24 November 2012	1
24 November 2012	6	"The Power of Love"	Gabrielle Aplin	1	15 December 2012	1
24 November 2012	1	"Ho Hey"	The Lumineers	8	24 November 2012	1
24 November 2012	1	"Love Is Easy"	McFly	10	24 November 2012	1
1 December 2012	8	"Troublemaker"	Olly Murs featuring Flo Rida	1	1 December 2012	2
1 December 2012	1	"Something New" ^{[HH]}	Girls Aloud	2	1 December 2012	1
1 December 2012	3	"Girl on Fire"	Alicia Keys	5	1 December 2012	2
8 December 2012	2	"Die Young"	Kesha	7	15 December 2012	1
15 December 2012	1	"Try"	Pink	8	15 December 2012	1
22 December 2012	7	"Impossible" (#5)	James Arthur	1	22 December 2012	3
22 December 2012	9	"Scream & Shout" ♦	will.i.am & Britney Spears	1	19 January 2013	2
22 December 2012	10	"Stay" ^{[L]}	Rihanna featuring Mikky Ekko	4	29 December 2012	4
29 December 2012	2	"He Ain't Heavy, He's My Brother" ^{[PP]}	The Justice Collective	1	29 December 2012	1
29 December 2012	11	"I Knew You Were Trouble" ♦	Taylor Swift	2	19 January 2013	1

== Entries by artist ==
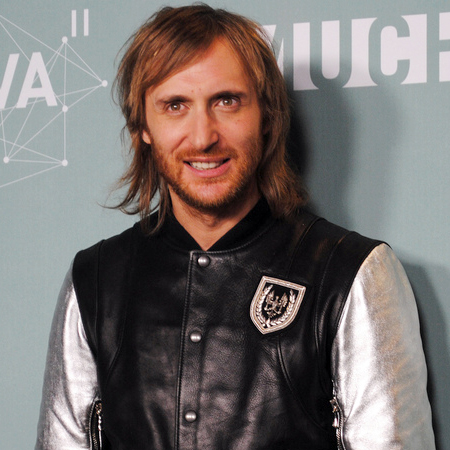
French DJ David Guetta had four top 10 singles this year, including his collaboration with Sia, "Titanium", which reached number-one in February and became the UK's fourth best seller of the year.

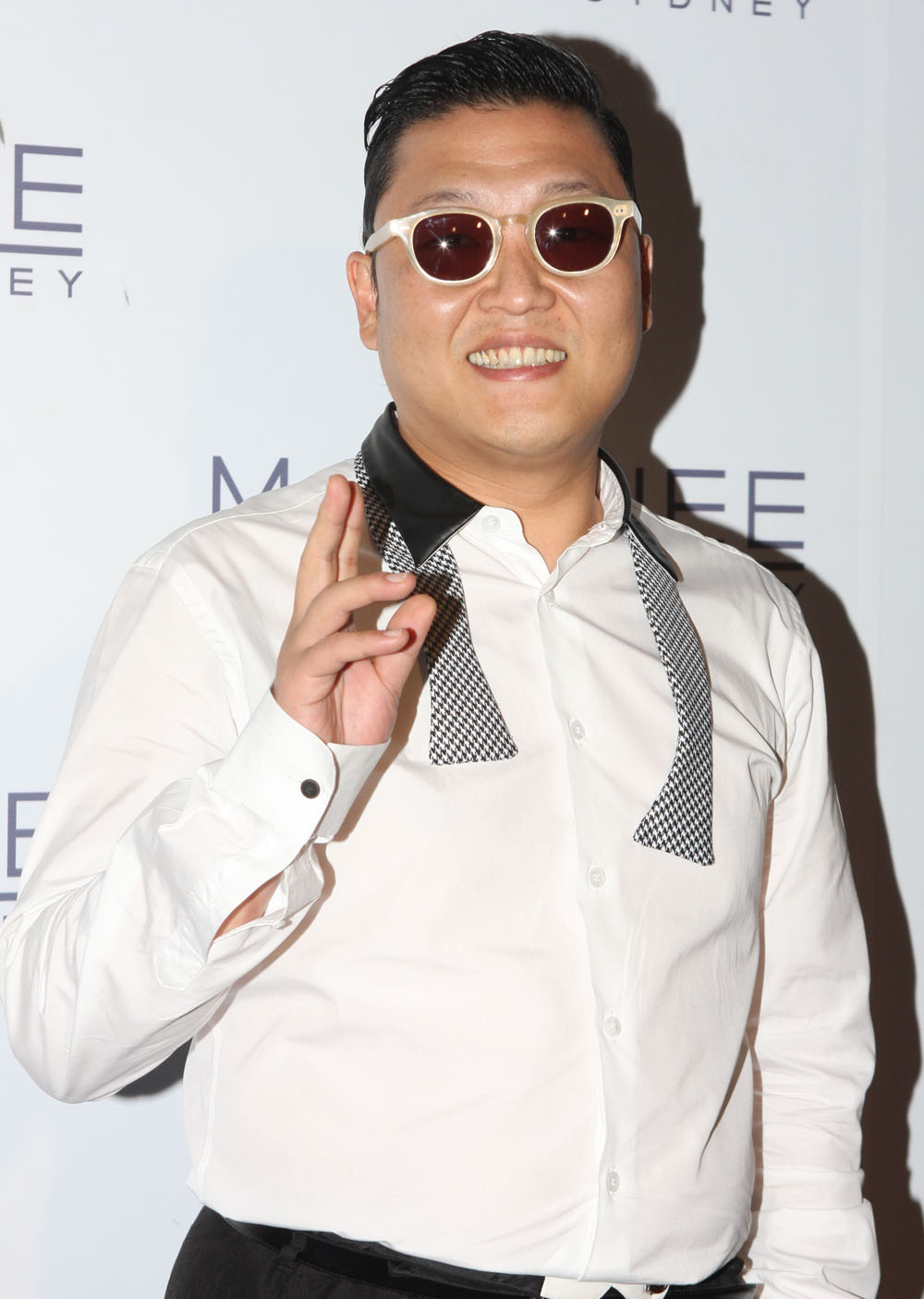
South Korean rapper and musician Psy spent 17 consecutive weeks in the UK top-ten, including one week at number-one, with "Gangnam Style", which became the sixth best selling single of this year.

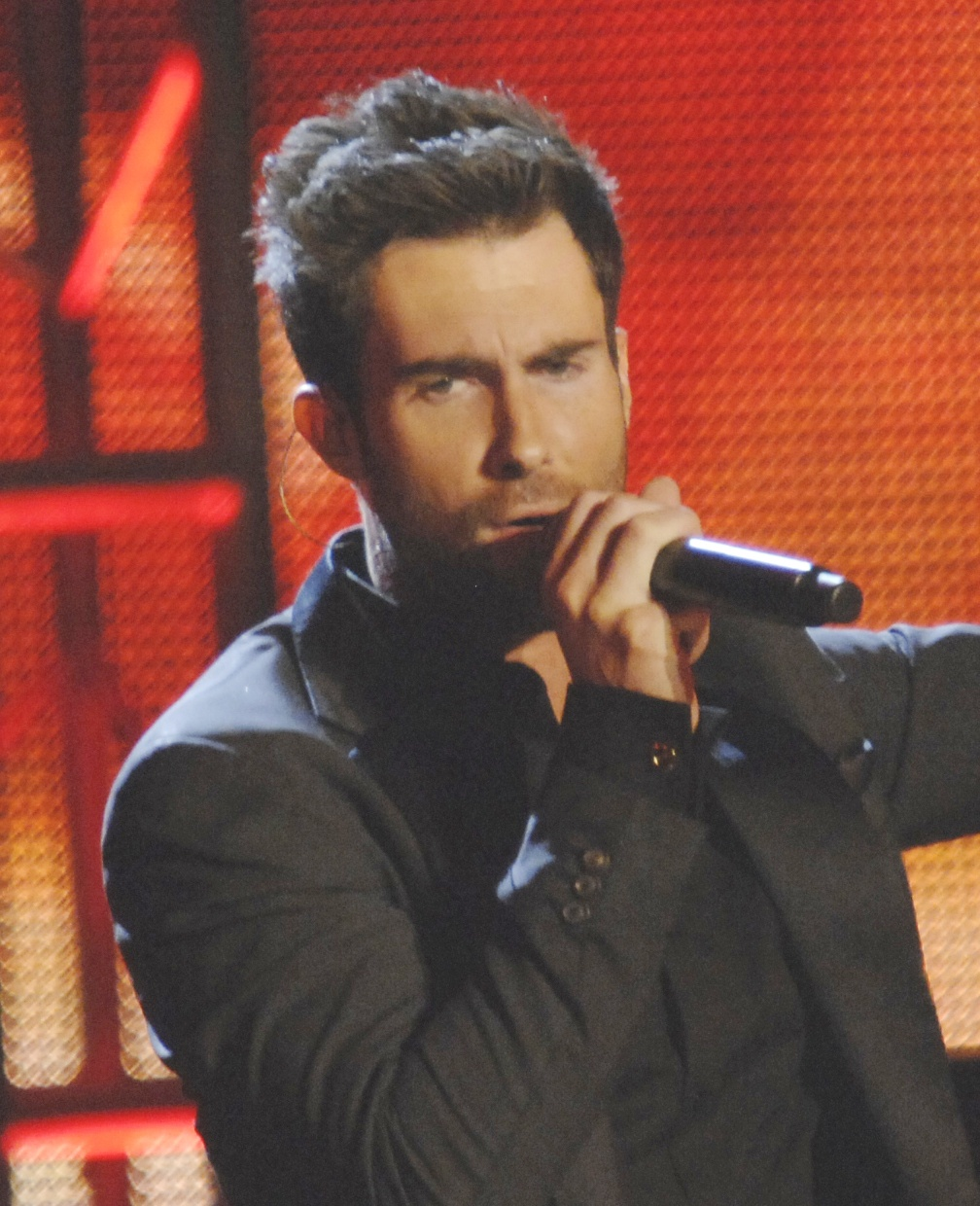
Adam Levine and his group Maroon 5 had two singles in the top 10 in 2012, including "Payphone", a collaboration with rapper Wiz Khalifa, which became the band's first UK number-one single.

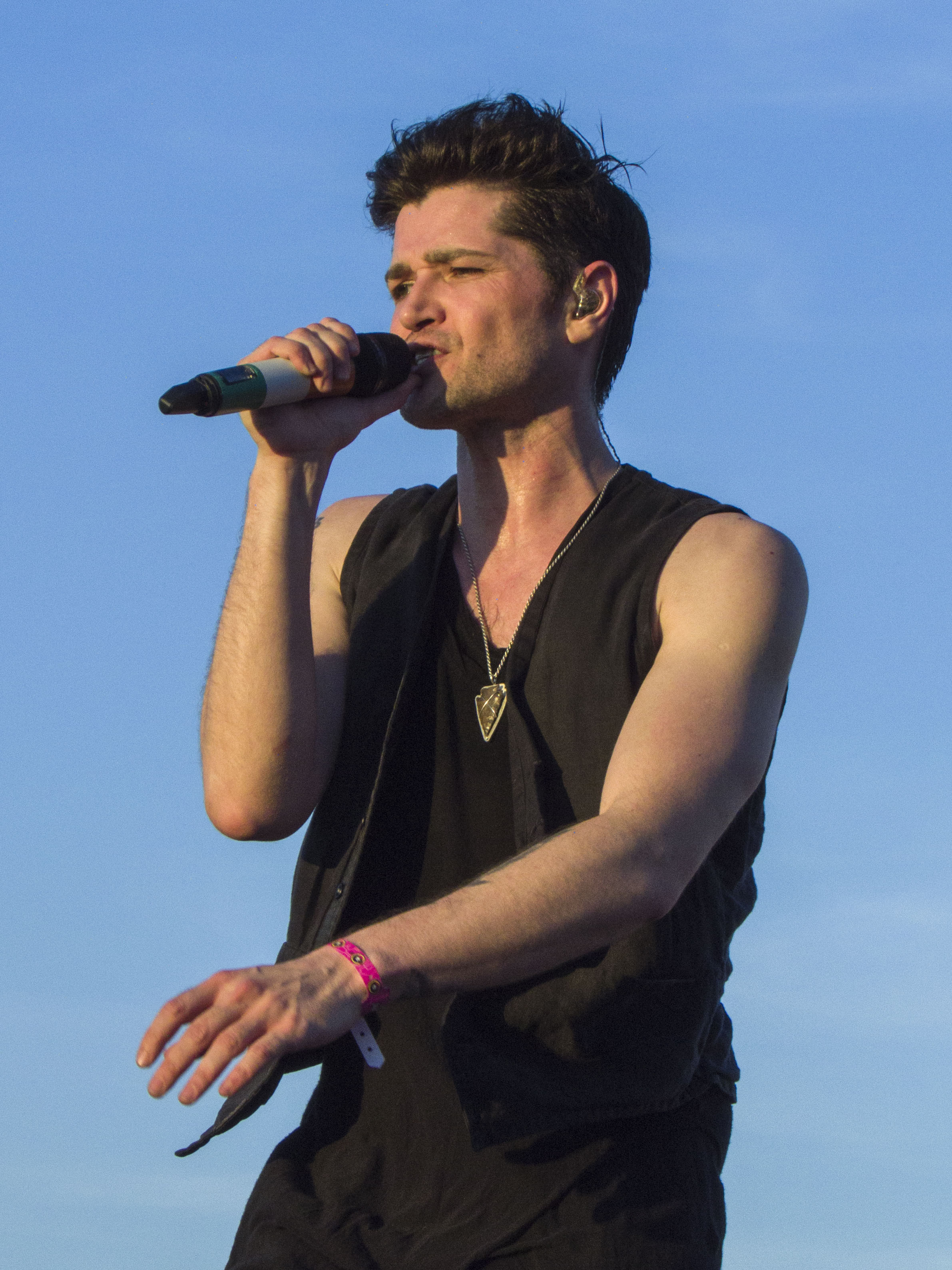
Irish pop rock group The Script (lead singer Danny O'Donoghue pictured) scored their first and only UK number-one single in September of this year with "Hall of Fame", a collaboration with will.i.am, which topped the chart for two weeks.

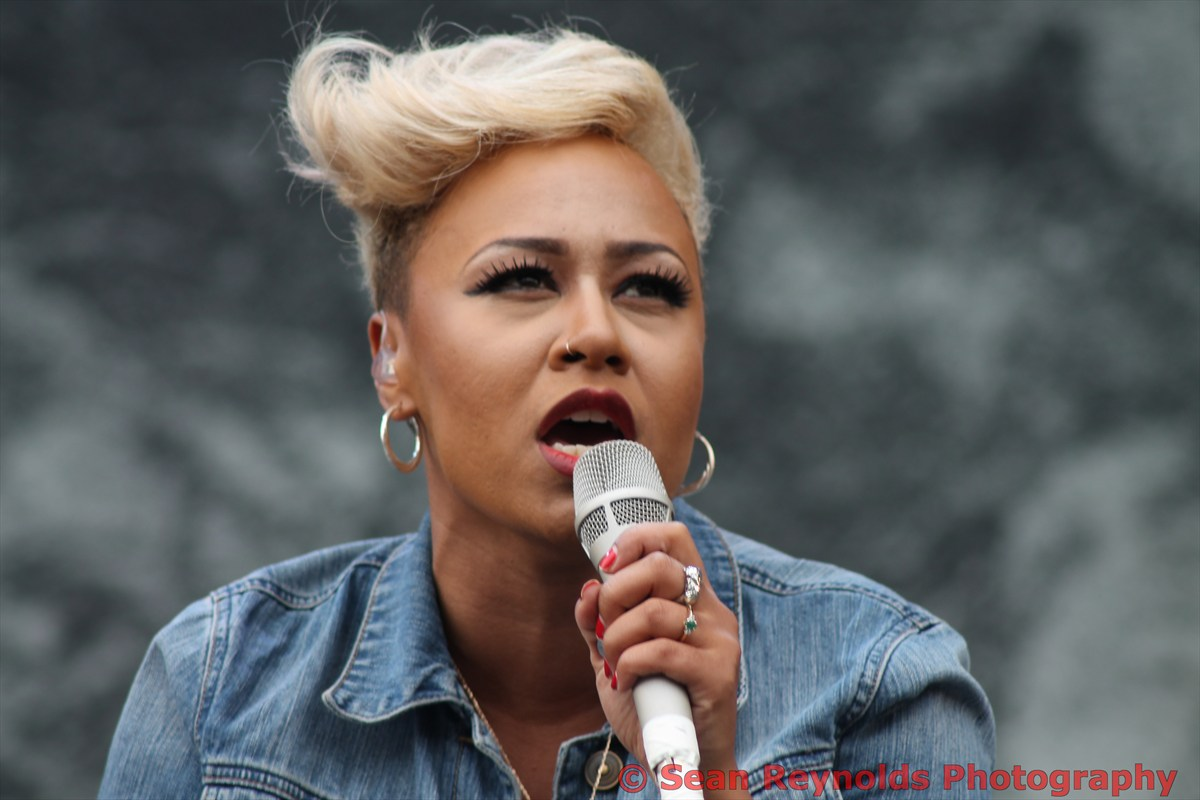
2012 proved to be a successful year for Emeli Sandé, who secured four UK top 10 singles, including her collaboration with Labrinth on "Beneath Your Beautiful", which reached number-one.

The following table shows artists who achieved two or more top 10 entries in 2012, including singles that reached their peak in 2011 or 2013. The figures include both main artists and featured artists, while appearances on ensemble charity records are also counted for each artist. The total number of weeks an artist spent in the top ten in 2012 is also shown.

Entries	Artist	Weeks	Singles
5	Flo Rida ^{[N]}^{[Q]}^{[QQ]}	37	"Good Feeling", "I Cry", "Troublemaker", "Whistle", "Wild Ones"
5	Rihanna ^{[N]}	26	"Diamonds", "Princess of China", "Stay", "We Found Love", "Where Have You Been"
4	Andy Brown ^{[P]}^{[S]}	4	"He Ain't Heavy, He's My Brother", "Standing in the Dark", "Taking Over Me", "When She Was Mine"
4	Calvin Harris ^{[N]}^{[T]}	11	"Let's Go", "Sweet Nothing", "We Found Love", "We'll Be Coming Back"
4	David Guetta ^{[U]}	23	"Laserlight", "She Wolf (Falling to Pieces)", "Titanium", "Turn Me On"
4	Emeli Sandé ^{[R]}	21	"Beneath Your Beautiful", "Next to Me", "Read All About It, Pt. III", "Wonder"
4	Rita Ora ^{[V]}	14	"Hot Right Now", "How We Do (Party)", "R.I.P.", "Shine Ya Light"
4	will.i.am ^{[O]}^{[W]}	16	"Hall of Fame", "Scream & Shout", "T.H.E. (The Hardest Ever)", "This Is Love"
3	Chris Brown ^{[X]}	11	"Don't Wake Me Up", "International Love", "Turn Up the Music"
3	Conor Maynard	8	"Can't Say No", "Turn Around", "Vegas Girl"
3	Ed Sheeran ^{[N]}^{[Y]}	3	"Drunk", "Lego House", "Watchtower"
3	Labrinth ^{[N]}	13	"Beneath Your Beautiful", "Earthquake", "Last Time"
3	Lawson	3	"Standing in the Dark", "Taking Over Me", "When She Was Mine"
3	Little Mix ^{[N]}	6	"Cannonball", "DNA", "Wings"
3	Ne-Yo ^{[Z]}	10	"Let Me Love You (Until You Learn to Love Yourself)", Let's Go", "Turn Around"
3	Nicki Minaj ^{[AA]}	18	"Pound the Alarm", "Starships", "Turn Me On"
3	One Direction	8	"Little Things", "Live While We're Young", "One Thing"
3	Sia ^{[BB]}	27	"She Wolf (Falling to Pieces)", "Titanium", "Wild Ones"
2	Carly Rae Jepsen	16	"Call Me Maybe", "Good Time"
2	Cheryl ^{[CC]}	5	"Call My Name", "Something New"
2	Coldplay ^{[N]}^{[QQ]}	11	"Paradise", "Princess of China"
2	Cover Drive	5	"Sparks", "Twilight"
2	DJ Fresh	7	"Hot Right Now", "The Power"
2	Example ^{[DD]}	6	"Say Nothing", "We'll Be Coming Back"
2	Florence Welch ^{[EE]}^{[FF]}	11	"Spectrum (Say My Name)", "Sweet Nothing"
2	Fun	17	"Some Nights", "We Are Young"
2	Jessie J	13	"Domino", "Laserlight"
2	JLS	2	"Hottest Girl in the World", "Proud"
2	Justin Bieber ^{[II]}	3	"Boyfriend", "Live My Life"
2	Katy Perry	7	"Part of Me", "Wide Awake"
2	Maroon 5	11	"One More Night", "Payphone"
2	Military Wives ^{[N]}^{[JJ]}	3	"Sing", "Wherever You Are"
2	Ms D ^{[KK]}	7	"Can You Hear Me? (Ayayaya)", "Heatwave"
2	Olly Murs ^{[N]}	8	"Dance with Me Tonight", "Troublemaker"
2	Paloma Faith ^{[P]}	3	"He Ain't Heavy, He's My Brother", "Picking Up the Pieces"
2	Pink	4	"Blow Me (One Last Kiss)", "Try"
2	Pixie Lott ^{[Lights]}	2	"Bright Lights", "Kiss the Stars"
2	Robbie Williams ^{[P]}	7	"Candy", "He Ain't Heavy, He's My Brother"
2	Stooshe	10	"Black Heart", "Love Me"
2	Swedish House Mafia	8	"Antidote", "Don't You Worry Child"
2	Taylor Swift ^{[O]}	11	"I Knew You Were Trouble", "We Are Never Ever Getting Back Together"
2	Tinie Tempah ^{[N]}^{[MM]}	5	"Earthquake", "R.I.P."
2	Travie McCoy ^{[NN]}^{[OO]}	3	"Ass Back Home", "Love Me"
2	Usher	4	"Climax", "Scream"
2	The Wanted	3	"Chasing the Sun", "I Found You"
2	Wiley	7	"Can You Hear Me? (Ayayaya)", "Heatwave"

== Notes ==
- ^{a} "Lego House", "Earthquake" and "Sexy and I Know It" re-entered the top 10 at numbers 7, 8 and 9 respectively on 7 January.
- ^{b} "Levels" and "Dedication to My Ex (Miss That)" re-entered the top 10 at numbers 4 and 10 respectively on 14 January.
- ^{c} "Stronger (What Doesn't Kill You)" re-entered the top 10 at number eight on 10 March.
- ^{d} "Turn Me On" re-entered the top 10 at number ten on 17 March.
- ^{e} "Picking Up the Pieces" re-entered the top 10 at number ten on 30 June.
- ^{f} "We Are Young" re-entered the top 10 at number ten on 4 July.
- ^{g} "Pound the Alarm" re-entered the top 10 at number eight on 18 August.
- ^{h} The 2012 remix version of "Running Up that Hill" entered the top 10 at number six on 25 August following its usage at the 2012 Summer Olympics closing ceremony; the original version peaked at number 3 in August 1985.
- ^{i} "Harder Than You Think" was originally released in 2007, but entered the top 10 after it was used by Channel 4 in their coverage of the 2012 Summer Paralympics.
- ^{j} "Some Nights" re-entered the top 10 at number seven on 6 October.
- ^{k} "We Are Never Ever Getting Back Together" re-entered the top 10 at number seven on 27 October.
- ^{l} "Stay" and "Don't You Worry Child" re-entered the top 10 at numbers 7 and 9 respectively on 12 January 2013.
- ^{m} "Candy" and "Beneath Your Beautiful" re-entered the top 10 at numbers 9 and 10 respectively on 5 January 2013.
- ^{n} Figure includes song that peaked in 2011.
- ^{o} Figure includes song that peaked in 2013.
- ^{p} Figure includes an appearance on the Justice Collective charity single "He Ain't Heavy, He's My Brother".
- ^{q} Figure includes appearance on Olly Murs' "Troublemaker".
- ^{r} Figure includes appearances on Naughty Boy's "Wonder" and Labrinth's "Beneath Your Beautiful".
- ^{s} Figure includes three top 10 singles with the band Lawson.
- ^{t} Figure includes appearance on Rihanna's "We Found Love".
- ^{u} Figure includes appearance on Jessie J's "Laserlight".
- ^{v} Figure includes appearance on DJ Fresh's "Hot Right Now".
- ^{w} Figure includes appearance on The Script's "Hall of Fame".
- ^{x} Figure includes appearance on Pitbull's "International Love".
- ^{y} Figure includes appearance on Devlin's "Watchtower".
- ^{z} Figure includes appearances on Calvin Harris' "Let's Go" and Conor Maynard's "Turn Around".
- ^{aa} Figure includes appearance on David Guetta's "Turn Me On".
- ^{bb} Figure includes appearances on David Guetta's "Titanium" and "She Wolf (Falling to Pieces), and Flo Rida's "Wild Ones".
- ^{cc} Figure includes one top 10 single with the group Girls Aloud.
- ^{dd} Figure includes appearance on Calvin Harris' "We'll Be Coming Back".
- ^{ee} Figure includes one top 10 single with the group Florence and the Machine.
- ^{ff} Figure includes appearance on Calvin Harris' "Sweet Nothing".
- ^{gg} Released as the official single for Sport Relief.
- ^{hh} Released as the official single for Children in Need.
- ^{ii} Figure includes appearance on Far East Movement's "Live My Life".
- ^{jj} Figure includes appearance on Gary Barlow & The Commonwealth Band's "Sing".
- ^{kk} Figure includes appearances on Wiley's "Can You Hear Me (Ayayaya)" and "Heatwave".
- ^{ll} Figure includes appearance on Tinchy Stryder's "Bright Lights".
- ^{mm} Figure includes appearances on Labrinth's "Earthquake" and Rita Ora's "R.I.P.".
- ^{nn} Figure includes one top 10 single with the group Gym Class Heroes.
- ^{oo} Figure includes appearance on Stooshe's "Love Me".
- ^{pp} Released to support the families affected by the Hillsborough Disaster.
- ^{qq} Figure includes song that first charted in 2011 but peaked in 2012.

== See also ==
- 2012 in British music
- List of number-one singles from the 2010s (UK)
