= Lawson (EP) =

EP by Lawson
- Released: 9 October 2015
- Genre: Pop rock
- Length: 34:52
- Label: Global Entertainment, Polydor

Lawson chronology
iTunes Festival: London 2013 (2013)	Lawson (2015)	Perspective (2016)

Singles from Lawson
- 1. "Roads" Released: 24 May 2015; 2. "Under the Sun" Released: 23 October 2015

Lawson is an EP released by the four-piece British band Lawson. It was released on 9 October 2015 via Polydor Records.

== Background and release ==
In March 2015, Lawson announced via social media that their second studio album was complete. In an interview with Capital FM, Brown said "The writing and recording process at Blackbird Studios in Nashville allowed us to test ourselves and try new sounds and directions," he added. "We're really proud of it." The lead single “Roads” was released in May 2015.

In May, the album was delayed due to Brown’s liver failure. In September, the band resumed work on their second studio album and said it is due out later this year or early next via Polydor Records. In the meantime, a self-titled extended play was released in October, containing new songs and previously released singles.

== Singles ==
The first single released from the Lawson EP is "Roads", which came out on 24 May 2015.

The second single is "Under The Sun", released on 23 October 2015.

== Track listing ==
Lawson EP track listing
No.	Title	Length
1.	"We Are Kings"	3:59
2.	"Under the Sun"	3:24
3.	"Mountains"	3:40
4.	"Roads"	3:37

Lawson Track listing (with international bonus tracks)
No.	Title	Length
1.	"We Are Kings"	3:59
2.	"Under the Sun"	3:24
3.	"Mountains"	3:40
4.	"Standing in the Dark" (International bonus track)	3:31
5.	"Roads"	3:37
6.	"Juliet" (Asian & Oceanian bonus track)	3:15
7.	"Brokenhearted" (featuring B.o.B; Asian & Oceanian bonus track)	3:31
8.	"Are You Ready?" (Asian & Oceanian bonus track)	3:34
9.	"Back to Life" (Asian & Oceanian bonus track)	3:15
10.	"Parachute" (Asian & Oceanian bonus track)	3:05

== Charts ==
Chart (2015)	Peak position
Australian Albums Chart	76
