= Black Out the Sun =

Black Out the Sun may refer to:

- Black Out the Sun (album), or the title track, by Sevendust, 2013
- "Black Out the Sun" (song), by Darren Hayes, 2011
- Black Out the Sun, a 2006 EP by Radford

== See also ==
- Black Out the Sun Tour, a 2016–2017 concert tour by the Zac Brown Band
