= Black Out the Sun (song) =

Single by Darren Hayes

from the album Secret Codes and Battleships
- Released: 2 October 2011
- Genre: Pop, synthpop
- Length: 4:10
- Label: Mercury Records, Powdered Sugar
- Songwriters: Darren Hayes, Kavin Grig

Darren Hayes singles chronology
"Bloodstained Heart" (2011)	"Black Out the Sun" (2011)	"Stupid Mistake" (2012)

"Black Out the Sun" is the third overall single from British-based Australian singer-songwriter Darren Hayes' fourth studio album, Secret Codes and Battleships, released on 2 October 2011. The song debuted at #101 on the UK Singles Chart. The song received its first radio airplay on BBC Radio 2 on 25 August 2011. The single was released as the fourth Australian single on 20 July 2012.

== Composition ==
"Black Out the Sun" was co-written by Darren Hayes and Armenian writer and producer Kavin Grig.The song was originally written for British singer-songwriter Leona Lewis as part of his task of writing songs for other artists, but ultimately Hayes kept it for himself. The single was mixed by Robert Orton, who has previously worked with t.A.T.u. and Lady Gaga.

== Music video ==
The music video for "Black Out the Sun" premiered on Hayes' official YouTube channel on 21 August 2011, at a total length of four minutes and fifteen seconds. The video features Hayes on a deserted beach surrounded by cloaked figures. It was shot at a sound stage at Village Roadshow studios in Queensland, using vintage anamorphic lenses from the '70s. Arjanwrites said of the video, The new video for "Black Out the Sun" is a perfect match for the atmospheric quality of the pop ballad. Standing on a deserted beach and surrounded by grim reapers, Hayes seems isolated, lost and confused. The dark and lifeless wasteland pictured in the video is the perfect backdrop for Hayes' state of mind in the song.

== Track listing ==
- Digital download
1. "Black Out the Sun" – 4:10
2. "Black Out the Sun" (orchestral version) – 4:09
3. "Black Out the Sun" (extended version) – 6:36
4. "Black Out the Sun" (7th Heaven Club Mix) – 8:11
5. "Black Out the Sun" (music video) – 4:15
- 7" vinyl
1. "Black Out the Sun" – 4:10
2. "Black Out the Sun" (Live in the Attic) – 4:36
- Promo CD single
1. "Black Out the Sun" (UK radio mix) – 3:36
2. "Black Out the Sun" – 4:10
- Promotional EP #1
1. "Black Out the Sun" – 4:10
2. "Black Out the Sun" (UK radio mix) – 3:36
3. "Black Out the Sun" (orchestral version) – 4:09
4. "Black Out the Sun" (extended version) – 6:36
5. "Black Out the Sun" (7th Heaven Club Mix) – 8:11
6. "Black Out the Sun" (7th Heaven Radio Edit) – 3:18
7. "Black Out the Sun" (Live in the Attic) – 4:36
- Promotional EP #2
1. "Black Out the Sun" (7th Heaven Club Mix) – 8:11
2. "Black Out the Sun" (7th Heaven Radio Edit) – 3:18
3. "Black Out the Sun" (7th Heaven Dub Mix) – 7:59
4. "Black Out the Sun" (RAW Club Mix) – 6:08
5. "Black Out the Sun" (RAW Radio Edit) – 3:05
6. "Black Out the Sun" (RAW Dub Mix) – 5:47
7. "Black Out the Sun" (Club Junkies Mix) – 6:18
8. "Black Out the Sun" (Club Junkies Radio Edit) – 3:13
9. "Black Out the Sun" (Club Junkies Dub) – 5:19
10. "Black Out the Sun" (extended version) – 6:36

== Release history ==
Country	Release date	Format	Label
United Kingdom	2 October 2011	Digital download, 7" vinyl	Mercury Records
