= Talk Talk Talk (song) =

Single by Darren Hayes

from the album Secret Codes and Battleships
- B-side: "Angel"
- Released: 24 June 2011
- Genre: Pop, synthpop
- Length: 3:39
- Label: Mercury Records, Powdered Sugar
- Songwriter(s): Darren Hayes, Carl Falk
- Producer(s): Carl Falk

Darren Hayes singles chronology
"Casey" (2008)	"Talk Talk Talk" (2011)	"Bloodstained Heart" (2011)

"Talk Talk Talk" is a song by British-based Australian singer-songwriter Darren Hayes, released as the lead single from his fourth solo album, Secret Codes and Battleships, on 24 June 2011.

== Background ==
The track was released as the album's lead single simultaneously across the world. The single was released via digital download on 24 June 2011 via Mercury Records, with a physical release of the single on 7" vinyl following on 31 July. The song entered the ARIA Singles Chart and peaked at #79 in July 2011. The single peaked outside the top 100 in the United Kingdom. The single was released with two B-sides: a cover of Madonna's "Angel", and "Out of Talk", a mashup of the vocals of "Talk Talk Talk" with the Hall & Oates song "Out of Touch".

== Music video ==
The music video for "Talk Talk Talk" premiered on Hayes' official YouTube account on 20 June 2011, at a total length of three minutes and three seconds. Prior to the release of the music video, screenshots and behind-the-scenes footage from the video shoot appeared on Hayes' official website. The music video was released for airplay via British music channels on 24 June 2011. The video depicts Hayes performing the song in front of a wide variety of different landscapes, all designed by his partner Richard Cullen, who also directed the video.

== Track listing ==
- Digital download
1. "Talk Talk Talk" (radio edit) – 3:39
2. "Angel" – 4:22
- Digital download – remix EP #1
1. "Talk Talk Talk" (extended remix) – 5:32
2. "Talk Talk Talk" (7th Heaven Club Mix) – 6:31
3. "Talk Talk Talk" (Club Junkies Club Mix) – 7:49
4. "Out of Talk" – 3:08
- Digital download – remix EP #2
1. "Talk Talk Talk" (album version) – 3:42
2. "Talk Talk Talk" (Fred Falke Remix) – 8:02
3. "Talk Talk Talk" (Penguin Prison Remix) – 5:24
4. "Talk Talk Talk" (Penguin Prison Instrumental) – 5:26
5. "Talk Talk Talk" (music video) – 3:01
- 7" vinyl
1. "Talk Talk Talk" (album version) – 3:42
2. "Talk Talk Talk" (Live in the Attic) – 3:58
- Promo CD single
1. "Talk Talk Talk" (radio edit) – 3:39
- Promotional EP
1. "Talk Talk Talk" (Fred Falke Remix) – 8:02
2. "Talk Talk Talk" (Fred Falke Instrumental) – 8:01
3. "Talk Talk Talk" (7th Heaven Club Mix) – 6:31
4. "Talk Talk Talk" (Club Junkies Club Mix) – 7:49
5. "Talk Talk Talk" (Penguin Prison Remix) – 5:24
6. "Talk Talk Talk" (Penguin Prison Instrumental) – 5:26
7. "Talk Talk Talk" (extended remix) – 5:32
8. "Talk Talk Talk" (album version) – 3:42
9. "Talk Talk Talk" (Club Junkies Radio Edit) – 3:37
10. "Talk Talk Talk" (7th Heaven Radio Edit) – 3:54
11. "Talk Talk Talk" (Fred Falke Radio Edit) – 3:36
12. "Talk Talk Talk" (radio edit) – 3:39

== Release history ==
Country	Date	Format	Label
Worldwide	24 June 2011	Digital download	Mercury Records
United Kingdom	31 July 2011	7" vinyl	Mercury Records
