= Stupid Mistake =

Single by Darren Hayes

from the album Secret Codes and Battleships
- Released: 7 May 2012 (Digital download); 9 May 2012 (7" vinyl)
- Genre: Pop
- Length: 4:38 (album version); 3:30 (radio mix)
- Label: Mercury Records, Powdered Sugar
- Songwriters: Darren Hayes, Carl Falk

Darren Hayes singles chronology
"Bloodstained Heart" (2011)	"Stupid Mistake" (2012)	"I Never Cried So Much in My Whole Life" (2019)

"Stupid Mistake" is a song by British-based Australian singer-songwriter Darren Hayes, released as the fourth single from his fourth studio album, Secret Codes and Battleships, on 7 May 2012.

== Background ==
The track was written by Hayes and long-time writing collaborator Robert Conley, and was co-produced by Justin Shave, who was credited as one of the main producers on Hayes's third studio album, This Delicate Thing We've Made. Unlike the remainder of the album, the track emphasises a darker, jazz and blues kind of melody, and was written as one of the first tracks for the album. The track was hand-picked by Hayes for release as a single, due to its popularity amongst fans and its personal meaning to himself.

== Music video ==
The music video for "Stupid Mistake" premiered on Hayes' official YouTube account on 5 April 2012, at a total length of three minutes and forty-seven seconds. The music video shows Hayes in a dark room, which appears to be his dressing room, sitting in front of a mirror, whilst dressing himself up as a clown. Once completely in costume, Hayes appears to make his way to the stage to perform the remainder of the song in costume. The video was directed and produced by Richard Cullen, Hayes' husband.

== Track listing ==
- Digital download
1. "Stupid Mistake" (radio mix) – 3:30
2. "Black Out the Sun" (Live from The Secret's Out Tour) – 4:57
3. "The Siren's Call" (Live from The Secret's Out Tour) – 4:49
4. "Bloodstained Heart" (Wayne G's Electro Club Mix) – 9:30
- Digital download – remix
1. "Stupid Mistake" (Bright Light, Bright Light Remix) – 3:46
- 7" vinyl
1. "Stupid Mistake" (radio mix) – 3:30
2. "The Siren's Call" (orchestral version) – 5:18
- Promo CD single
1. "Stupid Mistake" (radio mix) – 3:30
- Promotional EP
1. "Stupid Mistake" (radio mix) – 3:30
2. "Stupid Mistake" (album version) – 4:41
3. "Stupid Mistake" (demo version) – 2:58
4. "Black Out the Sun" (Live from The Secret's Out Tour) – 4:57
5. "The Siren's Call" (Live from The Secret's Out Tour) – 4:49
6. "Bloodstained Heart" (Wayne G's Electro Club Mix) – 9:30
7. "God Walking into the Room" (Wayne G's Electro Club Mix) – 7:18

== Release history ==
Country	Release date	Format	Label
Worldwide	7 May 2012	Digital download	Mercury Records
United Kingdom	9 May 2012	7" vinyl	Mercury Records
