= Perspective (Lawson album) =

Studio album by Lawson
- Released: 8 July 2016
- Recorded: March 2014 – March 2016
- Genre: Pop rock
- Label: Polydor, Global Talent

Lawson chronology
| Lawson (2015) | Perspective (2016) | CMD Z (2021) |

Singles from Perspective
- 1. "Roads" Released: 24 May 2015; 2. "Under the Sun" Released: 23 October 2015; 3. "Money" Released: 18 March 2016; 4. "Where My Love Goes" Released: 13 May 2016; 5. "Used to Be Us" Released: 1 July 2016

Perspective is the second studio album released by four-piece British band Lawson. The album was released on 8 July 2016. The album was preceded by the singles "Roads", "Money" and "Where My Love Goes". The album was recorded over the course of two years. Initial recording took place between March 2014 and April 2015; with additional recording sessions taking place between January and March 2016. The album introduces a more progressive and adult sound for the band, incorporating elements of synth-pop amongst a heavier selection of electric guitars.

== Background ==
Singer Andy Brown said of the album title; "The word "Perspective" was the perfect album title, you know with everything I've been through personally over the last few years health-wise and changing perspective on life, so couldn't have been more perfect for me." The standard version of the album was released via iTunes while an exclusive version of the album containing seven bonus tracks was released as part of a box set through the band's official store.

== Release ==
"Roads" was the first single to be released from the album on 24 May 2015. The single reached number 11 on the UK singles chart. It also became their first single to not chart in the Republic of Ireland. A lyrics video for the song was released on 11 March 2015; another video, shot in Lofoten, Norway which features a 1969 Chevrolet Camaro was released on 31 March 2015.

"Money" was released as the album's second single on 18 March 2016. The single did not chart as well as its predecessor, and did not peak inside the top 100. The music video for "Money" was released on 4 February 2016. It was one of the first written for the album. It was revealed that Lawson wrote the song years before whilst touring in a van, struggling to find gigs. The song is said to be revamped for 2016. "Money" differs in sound to the rest of the material previously unveiled (as Lawson EP) from their upcoming album. The new single features a hint of reggae in addition to their pop rock sound, similar to "Juliet". Lead singer Andy Brown said about the single:

We first had the idea of Money when we were unsigned and touring around in an old van, absolutely skint. We used to sing 'Where’s the money?!' after driving 100s of miles to play to 10 people! After the success of the first album, we developed it further and it just turned into this big, pop anthem. It's going to be a big favourite in the live set- we shot the video last week and invited a bunch of our friends and fans down to be in it and they were all singing along after the first listen.

Lewis Corner of Digital Spy said this about their new single: "British pop-rockers Lawson are back with a big new track ahead of the release of their second studio album. And they're crooning about something we can all relate to - being skint."

"Where My Love Goes" was released as the album's third single on 13 May 2016. The music video was released on 19 May, and depicts Andy proposing to his girlfriend, Joey McDowall.

== Track listing ==
Perspective — Standard edition
| No. | Title | Writer(s) | Producer(s) | Length |
|---|---|---|---|---|
| 1. | "Perspective" (intro) | Andy Brown; Joel Peat | Brown; Peat | 1:11 |
| 2. | "We Are the Fire" | Brown; Ki Fitzgerald; Harry Sommerdahl | John Fields | 4:08 |
| 3. | "Money" | Brown; Fitzgerald; Matt Schwartz | Fields | 2:49 |
| 4. | "Where My Love Goes" | Brown; Tim Woodcock | Woodcock | 3:42 |
| 5. | "Rio" | Brown; Fitzgerald; Schwartz | Fields | 4:15 |
| 6. | "When I'm Old" | Brown; Fitzgerald; Joe Caleb; David Dawood | Fields | 3:04 |
| 7. | "Only Water" | Brown; Eg White | Fields | 4:16 |
| 8. | "Lion's Den" | Brown; Adriano Buffone; Gerard O'Connell | Fields | 3:26 |
| 9. | "Roads" | Brown; Duck Blackwell; Fitzgerald | Fields | 3:37 |
| 10. | "I Look Anyway" | Brown; Fitzgerald; Sommerdahl | Fields | 3:51 |
| 11. | "Used to Be Us" | Brown; Blackwell | Fields | 3:53 |
| 12. | "Love & War" | Brown; Fitzgerald; Woodcock | Fields | 3:54 |
| Total length: | | | | 42:06 |

Perspective — Deluxe edition bonus tracks
| No. | Title | Writer(s) | Producer(s) | Length |
|---|---|---|---|---|
| 13. | "Mountains" | Brown • Fitzgerald • Schwartz • Eric Turner | Fields | 3:40 |
| 14. | "We Are Kings" | Brown • John Shanks • Gary Go • Ruth-Anne Cunningham | Fields | 3:59 |
| 15. | "Love Is You" | Brown • John Reid • Nick Bailey • Ryan Ogren | Fields | 3:38 |
| 16. | "Under the Sun" | Brown • Fitzgerald • Blackwell | Fields | 3:24 |
| 17. | "Up in Flames" | Brown • Blackwell • Reid | Fields | 3:03 |
| 18. | "Champion" | Brown • Fitzgerald • Schwartz | Fields | 3:28 |
| 19. | "The Life of Michael May" | Brown • Fitzgerald • Mich Hansen • Daniel Davidson • Peter Wallevik | Fields | 3:34 |
| Total length: | | | | 66:52 |

== Charts ==
| Chart (2016) | Peak position |
|---|---|
| Scottish Albums (OCC) | 13 |
| UK Albums (OCC) | 23 |

=== Single ===
"Roads"
| Chart (2015) | Peak position |
|---|---|
| Scotland (OCC) | 4 |
| DWTM (Magic 89.9) | 8 |
| UK Singles (OCC) | 11 |
| Philippines (Play FM) | 21 |
| El Salvador (Punto 105.3) | 67 |

== Release history ==
| Regions | Dates | Format(s) | Label(s) |
|---|---|---|---|
| Australia | 7 July 2016 | Digital download, CD | Polydor, Global Talent |
| United Kingdom | 8 July 2016 | Digital download, CD | Polydor, Global Talent |
