= Secret Codes and Battleships =

Studio album by Darren Hayes
- Released: 21 October 2011
- Recorded: 2008–2010
- Genre: Pop; electropop
- Length: 47:31
- Label: Mercury
- Producer: Carl Falk; Brian West; Darren Hayes; Justin Shave; Robert Conley; Steve Robson; Sébastien Izambard

Darren Hayes chronology
We Are Smug (2009)	Secret Codes and Battleships (2011)	Homosexual (2022)

Singles from Secret Codes and Battleships
- 1. "Talk Talk Talk" Released: 24 June 2011; 2. "Bloodstained Heart" Released: 5 September 2011; 3. "Black Out the Sun" Released: 2 October 2011; 4. "Stupid Mistake" Released: 7 May 2012

Secret Codes and Battleships is the fourth studio album from Australian singer-songwriter Darren Hayes. It was released 21 October 2011 on Mercury Records in Australia, on EMI Records in the United Kingdom on 24 October, and on his own label Powdered Sugar for the rest of the world on 25 October.

== Background ==
Prior to making the album, Hayes had been writing songs for other people, such as Simon Cowell. During this process however, he realised he was making songs for himself. He then announced in early 2009 that he had begun making a new album. Hayes has described the record as revolving around relationships, as described in the first single "Talk Talk Talk". According to Hayes, "Black Out the Sun" was written around 2008, and was originally written for Leona Lewis. Hayes began recording the album in 2009. He worked with producers such as Walter Afanasieff, who he had not worked with since Spin, and Carl Falk, a well-known Swedish synthpop producer. In early 2010 he announced he was returning to the studio despite having completed the album and was going to write more songs. Hayes documented the process through a series of "Making of" videos, in which snippets of several songs from the new album could be heard. The album was mixed by Robert Orton, best known for his work with Lady Gaga. Work was completed on the album in mid-2010. Hayes has said that it will be a pop album, and likened it to the first Savage Garden record.

== Release ==
Originally, the album was set for a mid-2010 release. This was later changed to early 2011, with a single due late 2010. Eventually, the album was confirmed to be set for an October 2011 release. Hayes announced that the album is to be released in 3 formats. A Regular and Deluxe edition which be available in all music stores and a Collectors Edition which will only be sold via his online webstore. The Collectors Edition is to include a 2-CD set, a violet 12" vinyl, a full 12" 32-page booklet and 1 of 4 lithographs. Beginning in mid-2011, a series of coded messages were presented on Hayes' website, along with a piece of artwork. Fans could submit their decoded messages, and each piece of artwork and code was made into a physical item which Hayes signed and sent to whoever decoded the text. On 18 September 2011, a secret code campaign was announced. Four divided parts of a code were placed inside separate bottles and deposited in various places around the globe. The four people who found the code each received a Collector's Edition of the album and a personal phone call from Hayes himself. Also, the four pieces of the code could be put together to unlock a part of the album. The first piece was located in Surry Hills, Sydney, Australia. The second was Mercatino Dell'usato at Porta Maggorie in Rome, Italy. The third was found in Mermaid Inn in New York City, The fourth and final code was discovered in the Hummingbird Bakery in Notting Hill, London, UK. On 3 October 2011, the resulting code-broken "piece of the album" was revealed; a preview video containing short snippets of the full 12-track album. Darren toured both Australia and the UK for this album with "The Secret Tour" during October and November 2011. These performances received very positive reviews, and his talents praised by the media. He has also said that he may continue touring the album in 2012.

== Reception ==
Professional ratings
Review scores
Source	Rating
AllMusic	3.5/5 stars
Digital Spy	4/5 stars

The album received positive reviews. Jon O'Brien of AllMusic was positive on the album and gave it three-and-half-stars out of five and called it "his most commercial since 2002 debut Spin" and wrote: "It remains to be seen whether Hayes is a little too late to win back the millions of fans who worshipped his previous wedding dance favorites, but by limiting his experimental tendencies and focusing on the kind of intelligent synth pop he does best, he's given himself a fighting chance." Robert Copsey of Digital Spy praised the album, particularly for the instrumentality of the tracks and the falsetto of Hayes. Copsey also claimed that the album could have easily been a Savage Garden comeback album. Jordy Kasko of The Tune, however, considered the album to be "sterile", and had also claimed that "Black Out the Sun" would have been a worldwide hit if it was performed by Leona Lewis, whom Hayes originally wrote the song for. Natalie Shaw of the BBC gave a somewhat positive review, praising Hayes for managing "the balance between sharp observations and effortless melodies". The album debuted No. 10 on the ARIA Top 50 Albums Chart as well as No. 3 on the Australian Album Chart. The track "Bloodstained Heart" also made its debut on the ARIA Top 20 Australian Singles Chart at No. 11.

The album received an ARIA nomination for Best Adult Contemporary Album in 2012.

== Singles ==
- "Talk Talk Talk" was announced as the album's first single in May 2011. Hayes described the song as a song "that you can dance to in a club, but at the same time you can listen to it after a breakup". The music video for the track was released to YouTube on 20 June 2011 and the single was released digitally on 24 June. Remix bundles were commissioned and released on 31 July.
- "Bloodstained Heart" was the second single in Australia, and was also used on an Australian X Factor promo. A music video was shot in early September 2011, and the song was released as a one-track download on iTunes on 5 September. It was later confirmed as the third UK single and was released on 26 February 2012.
- "Black Out the Sun" was confirmed in radio interviews to be the second international single, and was released on 2 October 2011. Hayes announced he was shooting the music video on 22 July, and it premiered on his YouTube channel on 22 August. It was released as the fourth single in Australia on 20 July 2012.
- "Stupid Mistake" is the fourth and final single for the album. The music video was premiered on 9 April 2012 on YouTube. The digital EP was released on 27 April in Australia and 7 May internationally.

== Track listing ==
No.	Title	Writer(s)	Producers(s)	Length
1.	"Taken by the Sea"	Darren Hayes; Steve Young; Robert Conley	Hayes; Justin Shave, Conley	4:24
2.	"Don't Give Up"	Hayes; Steve Robson	Robson	3:44
3.	"Nearly Love"	Hayes; Phil Thornalley; Mads Hauge	Thornalley; Hauge; Hayes^{[a]}	3:11
4.	"Black Out the Sun"	Hayes; Kavin Grig	Falk; Hayes^{[a]}	4:10
5.	"Talk Talk Talk"	Hayes; Falk	Falk; Hayes^{[a]}	3:39
6.	"Bloodstained Heart"	Hayes; Falk	Falk; Hayes^{[a]}	3:51
7.	"God Walking into the Room"	Hayes; Shave	Hayes; Shave	4:22
8.	"Hurt"	Hayes; Steve Lironi	Hayes; Shave	3:19
9.	"Roses"	Hayes; Walter Afanasieff	Afanasieff	4:19
10.	"Stupid Mistake"	Hayes; Conley	Hayes; Shave; Conley	4:38
11.	"Cruel Cruel World"	Hayes; Brian West	Hayes; West	3:53
12.	"The Siren's Call"	Hayes; Falk	Falk; Hayes^{[a]}	4:01
Total length:				47:31

Deluxe edition bonus disc
No.	Title	Writer(s)	Length
1.	"Explode"	Hayes; West	4:26
2.	"Perfect"	Hayes; Rick Nowels	4:27
3.	"Tiny Little Flashlights"	Hayes; West	4:02
4.	"Nothing"	Hayes; Conley	3:32
5.	"Glorious"	Hayes; Conley	6:17
6.	"Talk Talk Talk" (Live in the Attic)	Hayes; Falk	4:02
7.	"Black Out the Sun" (Live in the Attic)	Hayes; Falk	4:15
Total length:			78:32

Collector's edition bonus disc
No.	Title	Writer(s)	Length
1.	"Explode"	Hayes; West	4:26
2.	"Perfect"	Hayes; Nowels	4:27
3.	"Tiny Little Flashlights"	Hayes; West	4:02
4.	"Wrecking Ball"	Hayes; Conley	3:30
5.	"Nothing"	Hayes; Conley	3:32
6.	"Glorious"	Hayes; Conley	6:17
7.	"Talk Talk Talk" (Live in the Attic)	Hayes; Falk	4:02
8.	"Black Out the Sun" (Live in the Attic)	Hayes; Kavin Grig	4:15
9.	"The Sweetest Lullaby" (Demo)	Hayes; Shave	5:57
10.	"Hurt" (Demo)	Hayes; Lironi	3:41
11.	"Stupid Mistake" (Demo)	Hayes; Conley	3:35
12.	"Perfect" (Demo)	Hayes; Nowels	4:02
Total length:			99:17

B-sides and other tracks
No.	Title	Availability	Length
1.	"Angel"	B-side to the digital single of "Talk Talk Talk"	4:17
2.	"Ending Before I Begin"	B-side to the digital single of "Bloodstained Heart^{[a]}	3:57
3.	"I Need You"	B-side to the 7" vinyl single of "Bloodstained Heart^{[a]}	4:48
4.	"Not Even Close"	Appears on the Tim Finn tribute album He Will Have His Way	4:03
5.	"Love Hangover"	A collaboration with Wayne G which appears on his album Remixxer	3:23
6.	"Alive"	Unreleased song written for Westlife	4:08
7.	"Big Love"	Unreleased demo written for Kylie Minogue	3:06

Notes

- ^{^[a]} – additional production

== Charts ==
Chart performance for Secret Codes and Battleships
Chart (2011)	Peak position
Australian Albums (ARIA)	10
UK Albums (OCC)	29
