= Chapman Square =

2012 studio album by Lawson

Chapman Square Chapter 1

Studio album by Lawson
- Released: 22 October 2012
- Recorded: May 2011 – August 2013
- Length: 43:03
- Label: Polydor, Global Talent
- Producer: John Shanks, Duck Blackwell, Ki Fitzgerald, Paddy Dalton, Carl Falk, Rami Yacoub

Lawson chronology
Chapman Square Chapter 1 (2012)	iTunes Festival: London 2013 (2013)

Singles from Chapman Square
- 1. "When She Was Mine" Released: 27 May 2012; 2. "Taking Over Me" Released: 5 August 2012; 3. "Standing in the Dark" Released: 14 October 2012; 4. "Learn to Love Again" Released: 1 February 2013; 5. "Brokenhearted" Released: 7 July 2013; 6. "Juliet" Released: 13 October 2013

Chapman Square is the debut studio album released by four piece British band Lawson. The album was released on 19 October 2012 via Polydor Records. The album includes their three top ten singles "When She Was Mine", "Taking Over Me" and "Standing in the Dark". The album was mainly produced by John Shanks with Duck Blackwell, Paddy Dalton, Ki Fitzgerald, Carl Falk, and Rami Yacoub.

The album was re-released in the autumn of 2013 as Chapman Square Chapter II, with the lead single from the re-release being "Brokenhearted", which features American rapper B.o.B. As of 2013, the album has sold 169,812 copies.

== Background ==
Guitarist Joel Peat said of the album: "We're all so excited to release our debut album, we've been building up to it for the past four years, and the album's title for us is special, because it is the first place that we played together as a band. Going out on tour to support the album is amazing too. Doing shows in our Hometowns feels like the perfect way to celebrate. Performing live is what we love the most, so to be able to play our biggest venues to date in the cities where we grew up is very special." Lawson have cited many inspirations for their debut album, including Polow da don and Mann. The album's track listing was confirmed by the band via their official website on 24 September 2012.

The album is named after Chapman Square, Southfields, SW19.

== Singles ==
"When She Was Mine" was released as the band's first official single on 27 May 2012, reaching #4 on the UK Singles Chart. Following the single release, the band undertook their second headline tour, in which they visited locations such as Glasgow, Sheffield, Nottingham, London and Birmingham. "Taking Over Me" was released as the band's second single on 5 August 2012. The single performed even better than the band's debut, peaking at #3 on the UK Singles Chart. In support of the single, the band appeared at the Blackberry Summer Daze concert in August 2012. In August 2012, the band announced a Hometown Tour, during which they visited several towns and cities across Britain, including the hometowns of band members Andy, Adam, Ryan. "Standing in the Dark" was revealed as the album's third single in September 2012, before becoming available to purchase from 14 October 2012. The single peaked at #6 on the UK Singles Chart. "Learn to Love Again" was released as the fourth single from the album on 7 February 2013, peaking at #13 on the UK Singles Chart, becoming the least successful single from the album overall. "Brokenhearted", featuring American rapper B.o.B, will be released as the lead single from the repackaged version of the album on 7 July 2013. A version without B.o.B has also been recorded.

== Track listing ==
Standard edition
No.	Title	Writer(s)	Producer(s)	Length
1.	"Standing In the Dark"	Andy Brown; Ryan Fletcher; Ki Fitzgerald; Dave Morgan	John Shanks; Jeremy Wheatley^{[a]}; Fitzgerald^{[b]}	3:23
2.	"Gone"	Brown	Shanks	4:10
3.	"Taking Over Me"	Brown; Shanks	Shanks	3:10
4.	"Everywhere You Go"	Brown; Fitzgerald; Talay Riley; Chris Young	Shanks; Fitzgerald^{[a]}; Young^{[a]}	3:14
5.	"Waterfall"	Brown; Jez Ashurst; Emma Rohan	Shanks	3:20
6.	"When She Was Mine"	Brown; Fitzgerald; Paddy Dalton; Duck Blackwell	Shanks; Blackwell; Dalton	3:38
7.	"Make It Happen"	Brown; Ashurst	Shanks	3:46
8.	"Learn to Love Again"	Rami; Carl Falk; Michel Zitron; Brown; Eric Turner; Joakim Berg	Falk; Rami	3:25
9.	"Stolen"	Brown; Fitzgerald; Dalton; Blackwell	Shanks	3:55
10.	"You'll Never Know"	Brown	Shanks	3:37
11.	"You Didn't Tell Me"	Brown	Shanks	3:26
12.	"The Girl I Knew"	Brown	Shanks	3:59
Total length:				43:03

Deluxe edition bonus tracks
No.	Title	Writer(s)	Producer(s)	Length
13.	"Anybody Out There?"	Brown	Shanks	2:44
14.	"Who You Gonna Call"	Brown; Ashurst; Jon McLaughlin	Shanks	3:20
15.	"Red Sky"	Brown; Anna Krantz; Dalton; Blackwell	Shanks	3:16
16.	"Touch"	Brown; Shanks	Shanks	3:37
17.	"Taking Over Me" (Acoustic version)	Brown; Shanks	Shanks	3:18
18.	"When She Was Mine" (Acoustic version)	Brown; Fitzgerald; Dalton; Blackwell	Shanks	3:49
Total length:				63:07

Super deluxe edition bonus DVD
No.	Title	Length
1.	"Video Message from Lawson"	0:13
2.	"LA Studio Footage"	5:32
3.	"When She Was Mine"	3:47
4.	"When She Was Mine (Behind the Scenes)"	4:12
5.	"Taking Over Me"	3:16
6.	"Taking Over Me (Behind the Scenes)"	6:19
7.	"Taking Over Me (Acoustic)"	3:22
8.	"Standing in the Dark"	3:48
9.	"Standing in the Dark (Behind the Scenes)"	5:25
10.	"Standing in the Dark (Acoustic)"	2:50
11.	"Make It Happen (Live at V Festival, 2012)"	4:06
12.	"Moves Like Jagger (Live at V Festival, 2012)"	4:04
13.	"Taking Over Me (Live at V Festival, 2012)"	3:23
14.	"When She Was Mine (Live at V Festival, 2012)"	5:02
Total length:		55:19

=== Chapman Square Chapter II ===
Standard edition
No.	Title	Writer(s)	Producer(s)	Length
1.	"Standing in the Dark"	Andy Brown; Ryan Fletcher; Ki Fitzgerald; Dave Morgan	John Shanks; Jeremy Wheatley^{[a]}; Fitzgerald^{[b]}	3:23
2.	"Gone"	Brown	Shanks	4:10
3.	"Taking Over Me"	Brown; Shanks	Shanks	3:10
4.	"Everywhere You Go"	Brown; Fitzgerald; Talay Riley; Chris Young	Shanks; Fitzgerald^{[a]}; Young^{[a]}	3:14
5.	"Waterfall"	Brown; Jez Ashurst; Emma Rohan	Shanks	3:20
6.	"When She Was Mine"	Brown; Fitzgerald; Paddy Dalton; Duck Blackwell	Shanks; Blackwell; Dalton	3:38
7.	"Make It Happen"	Brown; Ashurst	Shanks	3:46
8.	"Learn to Love Again" (Radio edit)	Rami; Carl Falk; Michel Zitron; Brown; Eric Turner; Joakim Berg	Falk; Rami	3:25
9.	"Stolen"	Brown; Fitzgerald; Dalton; Blackwell	Shanks	3:55
10.	"You'll Never Know"	Brown	Shanks	3:37
11.	"You Didn't Tell Me"	Brown	Shanks	3:26
12.	"The Girl I Knew"	Brown	Shanks	3:59
13.	"Brokenhearted" (featuring B.o.B)	Brown; Fitzgerald; Dalton; Blackwell; Bobby Ray Simmons, Jr.	Harry Sommerdahl	3:31
14.	"Juliet"	Brown; Falk; Turner; Zitron	Falk	3:15
15.	"Love Locked Out"	Matt Schwartz; Brown	Schwartz	3:37
16.	"Are You Ready?"	Brown; Fitzgerald; Blackwell; Dalton; Ed Drewett	Blackwell	3:34
17.	"Back To Life"	Brown; Fitzgerald; Gary Clark; Sommerdahl	Sommerdahl	3:15
18.	"Parachute"	Brown; Falk; Andreas Carlsson; Turner	Falk	3:05
Total length:				62:20

Deluxe edition bonus CD
No.	Title	Writer(s)	Producer(s)	Length
1.	"Standing in the Dark" (Acoustic)	Brown; Fletcher; Fitzgerald; Morgan	Fitzgerald; Young	2:24
2.	"When She Was Mine" (Acoustic)	Brown; Fitzgerald; Dalton; Blackwell	Shanks	3:49
3.	"Brokenhearted" (Acoustic)	Brown; Fitzgerald; Dalton; Blackwell; Simmons, Jr.	Blackwell	3:31
4.	"Taking Over Me" (Acoustic)	Brown; Shanks	Shanks	3:18
5.	"Learn to Love Again" (Acoustic)	Brown; Rami; Falk; Zitron; Turner; Berg	Blackwell	3:37
6.	"Juliet" (Acoustic)	Brown; Falk; Turner; Zitron	Blackwell	3:51
7.	"Stolen" (Acoustic)	Brown; Fitzgerald; Dalton; Blackwell	Blackwell	4:02
8.	"Everywhere We Go" (The Chapman Square Tour Film)			13:17
Total length:				37:49

Notes

- ^{^[a]} signifies an additional producer
- ^{^[b]} signifies a vocal producer

== Charts ==
=== Weekly charts ===
Chart (2012)	Peak position
Irish Albums (IRMA)	23
Scottish Albums (OCC)	4
UK Albums (OCC)	4

=== Year-end charts ===
Chart (2012)	Position
UK Albums (OCC)	164
Chart (2013)	Position
UK Albums (OCC); Chapman Square Chapter II	108

== Certifications ==
Certifications for Chapman Square
Region	Certification	Certified units/sales
Philippines (PARI)	Gold	7,500^{*}
United Kingdom (BPI)	Gold	100,000^{^}
^{*} Sales figures based on certification alone.^{^} Shipments figures based on certification alone.

== Release history ==
Regions	Dates	Format(s)	Label(s)
Ireland	19 October 2012	CD, digital download	Polydor Records, Global Talent Records
United Kingdom	22 October 2012	CD, digital download	Polydor Records, Global Talent Records
Malaysia	5 November 2012	CD, digital download	Universal, Geffen Records
Taiwan	16 November 2012	CD, digital download	Universal
Australia	12 April 2013	CD, digital download	Universal
