= Learn to Love Again =

Single by Lawson

from the album Chapman Square
- Released: 3 February 2013
- Recorded: 2012
- Genre: Pop rock
- Length: 3:24
- Label: Polydor Records; Global Talent Records
- Songwriter(s): Rami; Carl Falk; Michel Zitron; Andy Brown; Eric Turner; Joakim Berg
- Producer(s): Carl Falk; Rami

Lawson singles chronology
"Standing in the Dark" (2012)	"Learn to Love Again" (2013)	"Brokenhearted" (2013)

"Learn to Love Again" is the fourth single by British pop rock band Lawson, from their debut studio album, Chapman Square. The song was released in the United Kingdom on 3 February 2013, via Polydor Records, and has peaked at number 13 on the UK Singles Chart. The song was written by Rami Yacoub, Carl Falk, Michel Zitron, Andy Brown, Eric Turner and Joakim Berg.

== Music video ==
Directed by Shane Drake, a music video to accompany the release of "Learn to Love Again" was first released onto YouTube on 20 December 2012 at a total length of three minutes and thirty-eight seconds.

== Critical reception ==
Robert Copsey of Digital Spy gave the song a positive review stating:

It's a rousing effort that blends their usual breezy guitar melodies with strobing synths and an anthemic, cooing chorus that places them somewhere between the youthfulness of The Wanted and the hooks of - dare we say - Bon Jovi..

== Track listings ==
Digital download

1. "Learn to Love Again" - 3:24
2. "Hurts Like You" - 3:32 (Written by Andy Brown, Ki Fitzgerald, Gary Clark)
3. "Learn to Love Again" (Acoustic) - 3:37
4. "Waterfall" (Acoustic) - 3:35

== Chart performance ==
Chart (2013)	Peak position
Australian ARIA Hitseekers Singles	12
Ireland (IRMA)	50
Scotland (OCC)	11
UK Singles (OCC)	13

== Release history ==
Country	Date	Format	Label
Australia	1 February 2013	Digital download	Global Talent Records
United Kingdom	3 February 2013	Digital download	Polydor Records, Global Talent Records
Malaysia	24 February 2013	Digital download	Universal, Geffen Records
