= Brokenhearted (Lawson song) =

Single by Lawson featuring B.o.B

from the album Chapman Square Chapter II Lawson
- Released: 7 July 2013
- Recorded: 2013
- Genre: Pop rock
- Length: 3:29
- Label: Polydor; Global Talent
- Songwriters: Andy Brown; Ki Fitzgerald; Paddy Dalton; Duck Blackwell; Bobby Ray Simmons, Jr.
- Producer: Harry Sommerdahl

Lawson singles chronology
"Learn to Love Again" (2013)	"Brokenhearted" (2013)	"Juliet" (2013)

B.o.B singles chronology
"Headband" (2013)	"Brokenhearted" (2013)	"Up Down (Do This All Day)" (2013)

Music video
- "Brokenhearted" on YouTube

"Brokenhearted" is the fifth single by English pop rock band Lawson featuring guest vocals from the American rapper B.o.B. It was released as the lead single from the re-issue of their debut studio album, Chapman Square (2012). The song was released on the United Kingdom on 7 July 2013, via Polydor Records. It debuted and peaked at number six on the UK Singles Chart. In the Republic of Ireland, the song reached number 12, becoming their highest-charting single to date in the country. It was added to the BBC Radio 1 and BBC Radio 2 playlists.

== Background ==
Speaking of the song, lead singer Andy Brown stated: "Brokenhearted is definitely a bit of a turning point for us as a band. It's my favourite song we have recorded to this day."

== Music video ==
The music video was directed by Declan Whitebloom. It follows a mystery female in her mission to bury the memory of an ex, climaxing in a performance from the band and B.o.B at a private party at a luxury house in the Hollywood Hills. the music video was released on YouTube on 27 May 2013

== Track listing ==
- Digital download
1. "Brokenhearted" (featuring B.o.B) – 3:29
- Digital download – EP
1. "Brokenhearted" (No rap version) – 3:20
2. "Brokenhearted" (Acoustic) – 3:29
3. "Brokenhearted" (Steve Smart & Westfunk Radio Edit) – 2:49
4. "Brokenhearted" (Seamus Haji Radio Edit) – 3:28
5. "Brokenhearted" (Queenie & Duke Remix) – 3:46
6. "Don't You Worry Child" (Live) – 5:23
- CD single
1. "Brokenhearted" (featuring B.o.B) – 3:29
2. "Don't You Worry Child" (Live) – 5:23
- 7" vinyl
1. "Brokenhearted" (featuring B.o.B) – 3:29
2. "Brokenhearted" (Seamus Haji Radio Edit) – 3:27

== Charts ==
Chart (2013)	Peak position
Hungary (Rádiós Top 40)	40
Ireland (IRMA)	12
Scotland Singles (OCC)	5
UK Singles (OCC)	6

== Release history ==
Region	Date	Format	Label
United Kingdom	7 July 2013	Digital download, CD single, 7" vinyl	Polydor Records, Global Talent Records
Malaysia	4 August 2013	Digital download	Universal, Geffen Records
