= Bloodstained Heart =

Single by Darren Hayes

from the album Secret Codes and Battleships
- B-side: "Ending Before I Begin"; "I Need You"
- Released: 5 September 2011 (Australia); 26 February 2012 (UK)
- Length: 3:14 (radio mix); 3:50 (album version)
- Label: Mercury Records, Powdered Sugar
- Songwriter(s): Darren Hayes, Carl Falk
- Producer(s): Carl Falk

Darren Hayes singles chronology
"Talk Talk Talk" (2011)	"Bloodstained Heart" (2011)	"Black Out the Sun" (2011)

"Bloodstained Heart" is a song by British-based Australian singer Darren Hayes, released as the second overall single from his fourth studio album, Secret Codes and Battleships, on 26 February 2012.

== Background ==
The track received an early release in Australia, being made available as the album's second single on 5 September 2011. The song debuted and peaked at #80 on the ARIA Singles Chart in October 2011. The single was later made available internationally on 26 February 2012, as the album's third overall single. This time, the single was backed with two exclusive B-sides: "Ending Before I Begin", which was partially revealed in one of Hayes' videos on the making of Secret Codes and Battleships, and "I Need You", a track written exclusively for the 7" vinyl single.

== Composition ==
The song was one of four songs on the album written with Swedish producer Carl Falk. Explaining the meaning of the song during an interview Hayes said: "The song means so much to me because I wrote it about a time in my life when someone close to me was going through a horrible time, and I wished more than anything that I could step in and take the bullet for them. We've all experienced that helpless feeling of standing by idly while someone you love is suffering—and wished that you could absorb the impact for them. It's about those situations in life where, maybe you feel you are losing the battle, but you'll never lose your dignity."

== Music video ==
The music video for "Bloodstained Heart" premiered on Hayes' official YouTube account on 17 September 2011, at a total length of four minutes and six seconds. The music video depicts Hayes with a woman at a beachside resort, performing with her whilst in bed or on the beach, by the sealine. The music video was directed by Chris Cottam, and was filmed during August 2011. It was released for airplay to the Australian music channels on 12 September 2011.

== Track listing ==
- Australian digital download
1. "Bloodstained Heart" – 3:51
- Australian digital download – remix
1. "Bloodstained Heart" (Monsieur Adi Remix) – 5:04
- Digital download – EP
1. "Bloodstained Heart" (radio mix) – 3:14
2. "Bloodstained Heart" (Monsieur Adi Remix) – 5:04
3. "Bloodstained Heart" (Kryder Club Mix) – 5:35
4. "Ending Before I Begin" – 3:57
- 7" vinyl
1. "Bloodstained Heart" – 3:51
2. "I Need You" – 3:53
- Promo CD single
1. "Bloodstained Heart" (radio mix) – 3:14
- Promotional EP
1. "Bloodstained Heart" – 3:51
2. "Bloodstained Heart" (radio mix) – 3:14
3. "Bloodstained Heart" (Monsieur Adi Remix) – 5:04
4. "Bloodstained Heart" (Kryder Club Mix) – 5:35
5. "Ending Before I Begin" – 3:57
6. "I Need You" – 3:53

== Release history ==
Country	Release date	Format	Label
Australia	5 September 2011	Digital download	Mercury Records
United Kingdom	26 February 2012	Digital download, 7" vinyl	Mercury Records
