= Taking Over Me =

2012 single by Lawson

Single by Lawson

from the album Chapman Square
- Released: 5 August 2012
- Recorded: 2012
- Genre: Pop rock
- Length: 3:10
- Label: Polydor Records; Global Talent Records
- Songwriter(s): Andy Brown; John Shanks
- Producer(s): John Shanks

Lawson singles chronology
"When She Was Mine" (2012)	"Taking Over Me" (2012)	"Standing in the Dark" (2012)

"Taking Over Me" is the second single released by British pop rock band Lawson, via Polydor Records. The single was released in the United Kingdom on 5 August 2012, as the second single from their debut studio album, Chapman Square, and reached number three on the UK Singles Chart, becoming their highest charting single to date along with "Juliet".

== Music video ==
A music video to accompany the release of "Taking Over Me" premiered on YouTube on 6 July 2012, at a total length of three minutes and ten seconds. Directed by Josh Forbes, the video features the four boys performing in a desert town, visiting places such as restaurants and clubs. The video paired each of the boys with a different on-screen girlfriend – Andy's on-screen girlfriend was played by Chelsea Turnbo, Ryan's by Melissa Jones, Joel's by Kat McCleary and Adam's by Lexi Johnston.

== Critical reception ==
Lewis Corner of Digital Spy gave the song a positive review stating:

"I can stop the world, with only just your kiss," frontman Andy Brown gushes on Lawson's latest single. It's a far cry from his heart-shattering ode to a past love on debut smash 'When She Was Mine', though given the song's chart success, the band certainly have a lot to be happy about at the moment. But while the four-piece return with a more positive outlook, their ear for a guitar-pop stadium filler remains second to none. "You're taking over me/ Oh, oh, oh, oh, oh/ I'm in ecstasy," they croon on a chorus befitting such elation; and with another stellar track under their worn, brown leather belts, we suspect they won't be coming down any time soon..

== Track listing ==
- Digital download - EP
1. "Taking Over Me" - 3:10
2. "Still Hurts" - 3:40 (Written By: Andy Brown, Carl Falk, Chris Braide)
3. "Let Go" - 3:41 (Written By: Andy Brown)
4. "Taking Over Me" [Acoustic] - 3:16
- Digital download - Remixes
1. "Taking Over Me" [The Wideboys Radio Edit] - 3:32
2. "Taking Over Me" [The Wideboys Club Mix] - 6:34
3. "Taking Over Me" [The Alias Radio Edit] - 3:49
4. "Taking Over Me" [The Alias Club Mix] - 5:51
- CD single
1. "Taking Over Me" - 3:10
2. "Still Hurts" - 3:40
- 7" vinyl
1. "Taking Over Me" - 3:10
2. "Taking Over Me" (Wideboys Remix Radio Edit) - 3:32

== Charts ==
=== Weekly charts ===
Chart (2012)	Peak position
Hungary (Rádiós Top 40)	39
Ireland (IRMA)	32
Scotland (OCC)	3
UK Singles (OCC)	3

=== Year-end charts ===
Chart (2012)	Position
UK Singles (Official Charts Company)	194

== Release history ==
Region	Date	Format	Label
United Kingdom	5 August 2012	Digital download, CD single	Polydor Records, Global Talent Records
Malaysia	12 August 2012	Digital download	Universal, Geffen Records
