= Ki Fitzgerald =

- Also known as: Azteck, KiFitzgerald
- Born: Kiley McPhail; 25 September 1983 (age 42); Rotterdam, Netherlands
- Origin: London, England
- Genres: Pop rock; EDM
- Occupations: Musician; singer; songwriter; record producer
- Instruments: Vocals; guitar; piano
- Years active: 2000–present

Ki Fitzgerald (born Kiley McPhail), also known professionally as Azteck, is an English DJ, musician, songwriter and record producer. He has written/produced several top 10 singles and albums and was a founding member of the English pop rock band Busted from 2000 to 2001.

== Early life ==
Fitzgerald was born in Rotterdam, Netherlands to British parents but moved at six years old and grew up in Kent, England. His father is the Scottish singer Scott Fitzgerald, who had an international hit with "If I Had Words" and also represented the United Kingdom at the Eurovision Song Contest 1988. In 2000, Ki Fitzgerald was an original member of pop punk band Busted. In 2008 Fitzgerald made an unsuccessful claim for copyright on the Busted songs "Year 3000", What I Go to School For" and "Sleeping with the Light On", which he had signed his rights away to in 2003.

== Career ==
In 2007, Fitzgerald formed the band Eyes Wide Open and signed a publishing deal with Music Copyright Solutions. The band toured the UK after making their debut at the GWR Fiesta to an audience of 40,000 people. The band members consisted of: Fitzgerald (vocals and guitar), Tom Warner (lead guitar), TK (bass guitar) and Pat Garvery (drums) and Will Farquarson (Guitar) who went on to become a member of Band Bastille. The band made appearances at festivals. The band broke up whilst in the process of recording their debut album with producer Steve Lironi (Bon Jovi) and mixer Simon Gogerly.

In 2015 Fitzgerald signed an artist deal with producer RedOne and his label 2101/capital records to develop his own album and to Join RedOne's writing group Team Red. The first release with Dutch DJ duo Sunnery James & Ryan Marciano was the song Come Follow with vocals from KiFi. It was released through Spinnin' Records in February 2015. Fitzgerald has been featured Vocalist on many EDM songs, including the single "Shine a Light" by Hardwell and Wildstylez, "Steal the moon" by DubVision, "Best part of me" by Firebeatz and DubVision, the Headhunterz single "Into the Sunset" which was featured on Ellen DeGeneres, Dancing with the Stars and upcoming releases with Armin van Buuren, Dash Berlin and many more.

== Songwriting and music production ==
In October 2011, Fitzgerald signed with Global Talent Publishing to focus on songwriting for other artists. Since then Fitzgerald has fast become a successful songwriter and producer for a diverse group of artists such as Galantis, Lawson, The Wanted, Jonas Brothers, B.o.B, Alex Hepburn, and Pitbull.

He is credited with having written 4 top 10 singles with UK band Lawson, including the releases "When She Was Mine" (UK No.4) "Standing in the Dark" (UK No.6) "Broken Hearted" featuring USA rapper B.o.B (Uk No.6) and final single Roads. Fitzgerald also contributed to the album tracks "Stolen" and "Everywhere You Go", "Die for You", "Getting Nowhere", "Hurts Like You", "Are You Ready", and "Back to Life", which featured on Lawson's top 10 debut album Chapman Square and "Chapman Square – Special Edition (Chapter II)".

Fitzgerald worked on the third and final album from The Wanted, Word of Mouth, which featured two co-writes, "Summer Alive" and "Heart Break Story".

He co-wrote the debut single by Sophia Del Carmen featuring Pitbull "Lipstick" with RedOne.

On Lawson's follow-up album Perspective, Fitzgerald co-wrote 11 songs including the singles "Money" and "Under the Sun". The album was released in June 2016.

He co-wrote and co-produced the single "Hunter" for Galantis and Madcon's "Got a Little Drunk".

More recently he co-wrote the Galantis single "San Francisco" featuring Sofia Carson. Fitzgerald wrote the single from Dimitri Vegas & Like Mike featuring Wiz Khalifa, "When I Grow Up". He also collaborated on the single from Sweater Beats and Icona Pop, "Faded".

He co-wrote "Monsters" for Saara Aalto for the Eurovision Song Contest 2018, where she represented Finland.

He co-wrote and gave the vocals on Armin van Buuren's single "Turn It Up" released in March 2019.
