= When She Was Mine =

2012 single by Lawson

Single by Lawson

from the album Chapman Square
- Released: 27 May 2012
- Recorded: 2012
- Genre: Pop rock
- Length: 3:38
- Label: Polydor; Global Talent Records
- Songwriters: Andy Brown; Paddy Dalton; Duck Blackwell; Ki Fitzgerald
- Producers: John Shanks; Duck Blackwell; Paddy Dalton

Lawson singles chronology
"When She Was Mine" (2012)	"Taking Over Me" (2012)

"When She Was Mine" is the debut single released by British pop rock band Lawson, via Polydor Records. The single was released in the United Kingdom on 27 May 2012, as the lead single from their debut studio album, Chapman Square (2012), and reached number 4 on the UK Singles Chart.

== Music video ==
A music video to accompany the release of "When She Was Mine" was released on 11 April. Directed by Declan Whitebloom at a total length of three minutes and forty-seven seconds, the video features the band performing the track in a high-rise building, looking out onto the street below, where a girl and her new boyfriend are courting. Lawson explained that the song was formed on the basis of the relationship between band member Andy Brown and his ex-girlfriend, Mollie King of the Saturdays.

== Critical reception ==
Lewis Corner of Digital Spy gave the song a positive review stating:

"What I miss the most/ Is talking up all night/ We laughed until we cried," Andy reminiscences over pop-rock guitars and beats that fall somewhere between the soul of Maroon 5 and the Script's knack for a worryingly catchy melody. "Now I'm breaking at the seams/ Dropping to my knees/ Nothing left of me," he confesses of his loss, before bursting into an ear-snagging chorus. Fortunately, we suspect the silver lining of this particular cloud is just about to shine..

== Track listings ==
- Digital download - EP
1. "When She Was Mine" - 3:37
2. "Anybody Out There" - 2:43
3. "When She Was Mine" (acoustic) - 3:49
4. "Red Sky" (acoustic) (The Brighton Sessions) - 3:07
- Digital download - Remixes
1. "When She Was Mine" (The Alias radio edit) - 3:37
2. "When She Was Mine" (The Alias club mix) - 5:34
3. "When She Was Mine" (Max Sanna and Steve Pitron radio edit) - 3:50
4. "When She Was Mine" (Max Sanna and Steve Pitron remix) - 7:58
- CD single
1. "When She Was Mine" - 3:37
2. "Anybody Out There" - 2:43

== Charts ==
Chart (2012)	Peak position
Belgium (Ultratip Bubbling Under Flanders)	25
Ireland (IRMA)	46
Scotland Singles (OCC)	4
UK Singles (OCC)	4

=== Year-end charts ===
Chart (2012)	Position
UK Singles (Official Charts Company)	175

== Release history ==
Region	Date	Format	Label
Malaysia	20 May 2012	Digital download	Universal, Geffen Records
United Kingdom	27 May 2012	Digital download, CD single	Polydor Records, Global Talent Records
