= Carl Falk =

Swedish musician and record producer

- Born: Carl Anthony Falk; August 17, 1980 (age 46); Sri Lanka or Stockholm
- Genres: Pop; dance-pop; pop rock; electropop; R&B; Europop
- Occupations: Songwriter; record producer; singer
- Years active: 2002–present
- Label: BMG

Carl Anthony Falk-Gramer (née Falk; born 17 August 1980), is a Sri-Lankan-born Swedish songwriter, record producer and musician. He has worked with Demi Lovato, One Direction, 5 Seconds of Summer, Nicki Minaj, Ellie Goulding, Madonna, Avicii, Ariana Grande, Charlie Puth, Jason Derulo, Westlife, Hilary Duff, Iggy Azalea, David Guettaand Liam Payne.

== Biography ==
As a student Falk attended the Adolf Fredrik's Music School in Stockholm. He then joined "The Location" in 2002, a new production and publishing-company formed by former Cheiron-members Kristian Lundin, Andreas Carlsson and Jake Schulz, leasing the former Cheiron Studios.

Falk left "The Location" in 2007 and re-located to Los Angeles in April 2010 to team up with Rami Yacoub and Steve Angello (Swedish House Mafia). Back in Sweden Carl and Rami started their production company and studio – Kinglet Studios.

Since 2010 he has co-written and co-produced hits like "What Makes You Beautiful", "One Thing", "Live While We're Young", "Kiss You" by One Direction and "Starships" and "Pound The Alarm" by Nicki Minaj. In 2012 Carl was listed as No. 4 on Music Week Top 100 Songwriters of the year based on the UK's 100 biggest selling singles of the year. The same year "Starships" also made US Billboard history, by both debuting in and spending a total of 21 consecutive weeks in the US Top Ten, passing The Black Eyed Peas's single "I Gotta Feeling". As of February 2013, it has sold 7.2 million digital downloads worldwide. Subsequently, he received two ASCAP awards for most performed songs of 2012: "Starships" and "What Makes You Beautiful".

Falk worked with Demi Lovato writing "Shouldn't Come Back" and "Really Don't Care" for her 2013 album "Demi". He also worked on "Rest Of Our Life" for Jason Derulo and "Red Lights" for Tiesto. Falk reached further success in 2014 when he worked with David Guetta on the hit single "One Last Time" for Ariana Grande, reaching no.13 on the Billboard's Hot 100 chart.

In 2015 Falk wrote songs like "Broken Arrows" and "Sunset Jesus" for Avicii, "Rest Your Love" for The Vamps, "Your Type" for Carly Rae Jepsen, "Lost & Found" for Ellie Goulding and "Devil Pray" For Madonna.

== Artistry ==
His favourite instrument is the guitar as he tries to "always have guitar on my songs, almost like a trademark".

Carl can also play other instruments such as bass, piano, violin and drums, which he started to learn from an early age on during his childhood.

== Awards ==
In 2013, Falk won the STIM Platinum guitar prize.

== Discography ==
=== Songwriting credits ===
| Year | Artist | Album | Song |
|---|---|---|---|
| 2003 | Westlife | Turnaround | "Obvious" |
| 2005 | Westlife | Face to Face | "Amazing" |
| 2009 | Westlife | Where We Are | "Leaving" |
| 2009 | VanVelzen | Hear Me Out | "Broken Tonight" (with Armin van Buuren) |
| 2011 | Nick Carter | I'm Taking Off | "Burning Up" |
| 2011 | Nick Carter | I'm Taking Off | "Remember" |
| 2011 | Darren Hayes | Secret Codes and Battleships | "Talk Talk Talk" |
| 2011 | Darren Hayes | Secret Codes and Battleships | "Bloodstained Heart" |
| 2011 | Darren Hayes | Secret Codes and Battleships | "The Siren's Call" |
| 2011 | One Direction | Up All Night | "What Makes You Beautiful" |
| 2011 | One Direction | Up All Night | "One Thing" |
| 2011 | One Direction | Up All Night | "I Wish" |
| 2012 | One Direction | Take Me Home | "Live While We're Young" |
| 2012 | One Direction | Take Me Home | "Kiss You" |
| 2012 | One Direction | Take Me Home | "Last First Kiss" |
| 2012 | One Direction | Take Me Home | "Heart Attack" |
| 2012 | One Direction | Take Me Home | "Back For You" |
| 2012 | One Direction | Take Me Home | "Change My Mind" |
| 2012 | Nicki Minaj | Pink Friday: Roman Reloaded | "Starships" |
| 2012 | Nicki Minaj | Pink Friday: Roman Reloaded | "Pound the Alarm" |
| 2013 | Demi Lovato | Demi | "Really Don't Care" (with Cher Lloyd) |
| 2013 | Demi Lovato | Demi | "Shouldn't Come Back" |
| 2013 | Jason Derulo | Tattoos | "Rest Of Our Life" |
| 2013 | Lawson | Chapman Square Chapter II | "Juliet" |
| 2013 | Tiësto | A Town Called Paradise | "Red Lights" |
| 2013 | One Direction | Midnight Memories | "Happily" |
| 2014 | Ariana Grande | My Everything | "One Last Time" |
| 2015 | Avicii | Stories | "Broken Arrows" (with Zac Brown) |
| 2015 | Avicii | Stories | "Sunset Jesus" |
| 2015 | Avicii | Stories | "Trouble" |
| 2015 | The Vamps | Wake Up | "Rest Your Love" |
| 2015 | Carly Rae Jepsen | Emotion | "Your Type" |
| 2015 | Ellie Goulding | Delirium | "Lost and Found" |
| 2015 | Madonna | Rebel Heart | "Devil Pray" |
| 2016 | Carly Rae Jepsen | Emotion Remixed + | "First Time" |
| 2017 | Avicii | Avīci (01) | "Without You" (with Sandro Cavazza) |
| 2019 | Avicii | Tim | "Bad Reputation" (with Joe Janiak) |
| 2019 | Avicii | Tim | "Ain't a Thing" (with Bonn) |
| 2019 | Avicii | Tim | "Fades Away" (with Noonie Bao) |
| 2019 | Joan | —N/a | "Drive All Night" |
| 2019 | Joan | —N/a | "One More Touch" |
| 2019 | Joan | —N/a | "Ease Your Mind" |
| 2021 | Liam Payne | Ron's Gone Wrong (Original Motion Picture Soundtrack) | "Sunshine" |

== Awards ==
Falk has won two Ascap Pop Music Awards with the songs "Starships" and "What Makes You Beautiful", amongst many other of awards and nominations. Falk received two nominations both in 2012 and in 2013 in the Swedish Music Publishers Awards (SMFF). Both years for Songwriter Of The Year and International Achievement. He was also nominated for the 2013 Swedish Music Export Award,

| Year | Award | Recipient/Nominated work | Category | Result |
|---|---|---|---|---|
| 2011 | 4Music Video Honours | What Makes You Beautiful | Best Video | Won |
| 2012 | Brit Awards | What Makes You Beautiful | Best Single Of The Year | Won |
| 2012 | Teen Choice Awards | What Makes You Beautiful | Choice Music: Love Song | Won |
| 2012 | MTV Video Music Awards | What Makes You Beautiful | Best Pop Video | Won |
| 2012 | MTV Video Music Awards | What Makes You Beautiful | Most Share-worthy Video | Won |
| 2012 | Telehit Awards | What Makes You Beautiful | Song Of The Public | Won |
| 2012 | Nickelodeon Mexican Kids Choice Awards | What Makes You Beautiful | Favourite Song | Won |
| 2012 | Nickelodeon Kid's Choice Awards Argentina | What Makes You Beautiful | Favourite Song | Won |
| 2012 | MuchMusic Video Awards | What Makes You Beautiful | Most Streaming Video Of The Year | Nominated |
| 2012 | Myx Awards | What Makes You Beautiful | Favourite International Video | Nominated |
| 2012 | BBC Radio 1 Teen Awards | One Thing | Best British Single | Won |
| 2012 | MuchMusic Video Awards | One Thing | International Video Of The Year -Group | Nominated |
| 2012 | MTV Video Music Awards | Starships | Best Female Video | Won |
| 2012 | Much Music Video Awards | Starships | International Video Of The Year | Nominated |
| 2012 | Q Awards | Starships | Best Video | Nominated |
| 2012 | Soul Train Awards | Starships | Best Dance Performance | Nominated |
| 2012 | Teen Choice Awards | Starships | Choice R&B/Hip-hop Song | Nominated |
| 2012 | 4Music Video Honours | Starships | Best Video | Nominated |
| 2012 | 4Music Video Honours | Pound The Alarm | Best Video | Nominated |
| 2012 | UK Music Video Awards | Live While We're Young | People's Choice | Won |
| 2013 | Bravo Otto | Live While We're Young | Best International Song Of The Year | Won |
| 2013 | Radio Disney Music Awards | Live While We're Young | Song Of The Year | Nominated |
| 2013 | Teen Choice Awards | Live While We're Young | Choice Music: Single - Group | Won |
| 2013 | MTV Video Music Awards Japan | What Makes You Beautiful | Best Group Video | Nominated |
| 2013 | Nickelodeon Kids Choice Awards | What Makes You Beautiful | Favourite Song | Won |
| 2013 | People's Choice Awards | What Makes You Beautiful | Favourite Song | Won |
| 2013 | Nickelodeon Kids Choice Awards Australia | One Thing | Aussie's Favourite Song | Won |
| 2013 | Myx Music Awards | One Thing | Favourite International Video | Won |
| 2013 | Neox Fan Awards | Kiss You | Best Song Of The Year | Nominated |
| 2013 | Billboard Music Awards | Starships | Top Dance Song | Won |
| 2013 | BMI Pop Awards | Starships | - | Won |
| 2013 | BMI Urban Awards | Starships | - | Won |
| 2013 | MTV Platinum Video Plays Awards | Starships | - | Won |
| 2013 | BMI London Awards | Starships | - | Won |
| 2013 | Ascap Pop Music Awards | Starships | - | Won |
| 2013 | Ascap Pop Music Awards | What Makes You Beautiful | - | Won |
| 2013 | BMI London Awards | Pound The Alarm | - | Won |
