= Lawson (band) =

English pop rock band

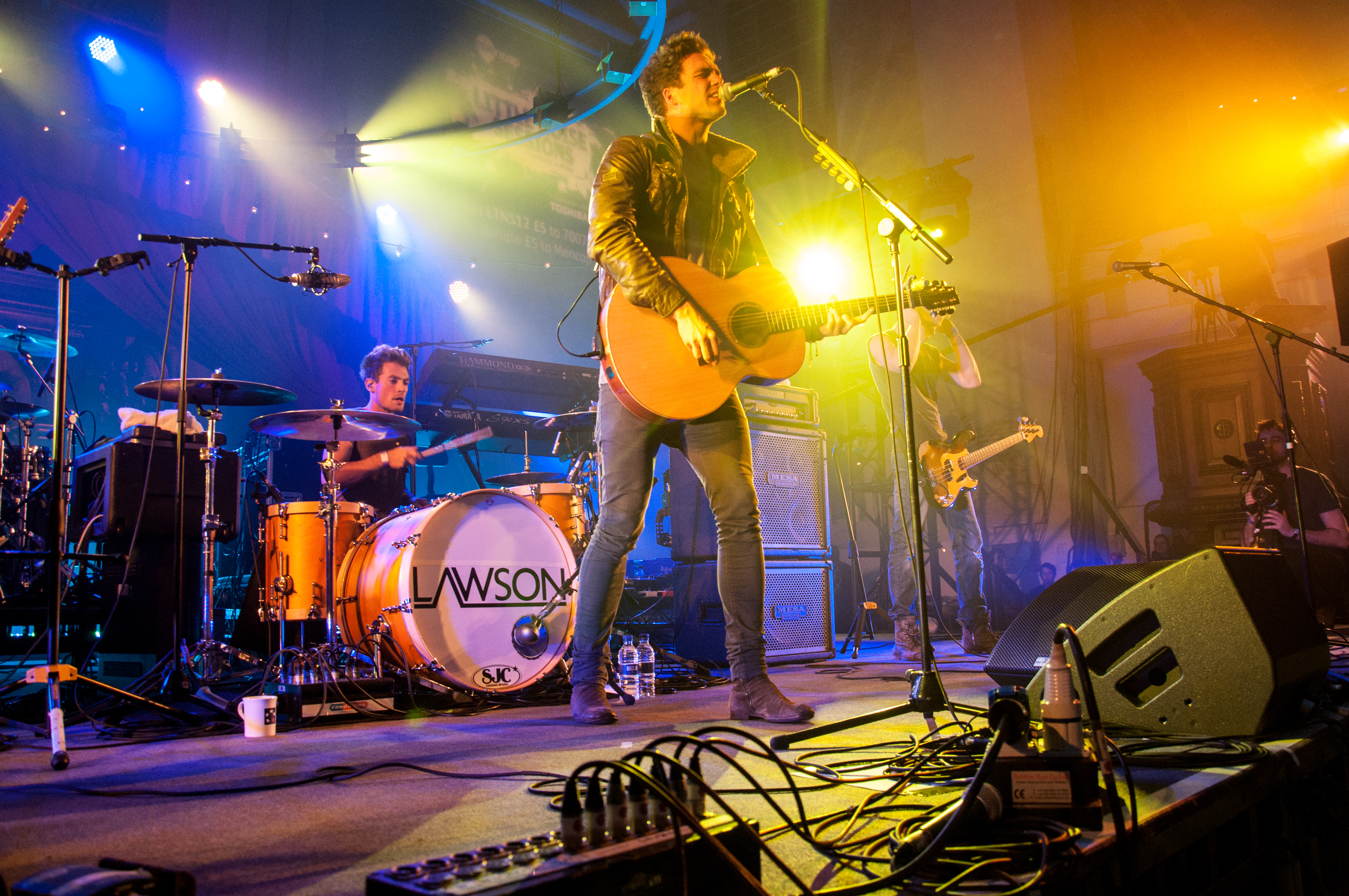

Background information
- Origin: Dorset, England
- Genres: Pop rock; synth-pop
- Years active: 2009–present
- Labels: Polydor; Mercury; Island; Global Talent; Cooking Vinyl
- Members: Andy Brown; Ryan Fletcher; Joel Peat; Adam Pitts

Lawson are an English pop rock band, consisting of Andy Brown (lead vocals, rhythm guitar), Ryan Fletcher (bass guitar, keyboards, backing vocals), Joel Peat (lead guitar, keyboards, co-lead vocals) and Adam Pitts (drums, backing vocals, percussion). The band's debut album, Chapman Square, was released on 22 October 2012 and reached number three on the UK Albums Chart. On 17 April 2020, the band released "Lovers", their first single after their four-year hiatus. To date, the band have achieved seven UK top 20 hit singles. They are named after Dorset-based surgeon David Lawson, who performed life-saving surgery on Andy Brown.

== History ==
=== 2009–2012: Early career and breakthrough ===
The band was formed in late 2009 and was earlier known as the Groves but they later changed their name to "Lawson" when David Lawson performed life-saving brain surgery on the lead singer Andy Brown. Lawson began recording material in early 2010. Acoustic versions of their early original material as well as covers of artists such as Bruno Mars and Adele built up an online fanbase. They soon began playing gigs around the United Kingdom, including the Wireless Festival and the Ultrasound Festival.

On 8 September 2011, it was announced that the band had been signed to Polydor Records, with a lucrative two-album deal on the cards. After signing to a major label, Lawson were tasked with opening for acts such as the Wanted, Will Young, Avril Lavigne, and Jessie J. The band toured extensively at the beginning of 2012, fitting in a headline tour of the UK in January and another in May as well as a one-off intimate show at Monto Water Rats in London which was streamed worldwide in April. During this time, the band worked on material for their debut album with writers and producers such as Carl Falk and John Shanks.

=== 2012–2013: Chapman Square ===
The band's first official single, "When She Was Mine", was released in May 2012 and reached number four on the UK Singles Chart. Following the single release, the band undertook their second headline tour, selling out venues in London, Glasgow, Manchester, Leeds, Nottingham, Sheffield and Birmingham. The band's second single, "Taking Over Me", was released on in August 2012, peaking at number three in the UK. In the summer of 2012, Lawson performed at T in the Park, V Festival and alongside Bruce Springsteen at Hard Rock Calling. They also announced a Hometown Tour, playing dates from October through November in their respective home towns and London, where they reside now. In October 2012, the band released their third official single, "Standing in the Dark", which reached number six in the UK. The band later revealed that their debut album, Chapman Square, would be released on 22 October. Guitarist Joel Peat said of the album: "We're all so excited to release our debut album, we've been building up to it for the past four years, and the album's title for us is special, because it is the first place that we played together as a band. Going out on tour to support the album is amazing too. Doing shows in our home towns feels like the perfect way to celebrate. Performing live is what we love the most, so to be able to play our biggest venues to date in the cities where we grew up is very special." Lawson cited many inspirations for their debut album, including John Mayer and Taylor Swift. On 22 October 2012, Lawson released Chapman Square, peaking at number four on the UK Albums Chart. The album was later certified gold. The band finished the year performing at the Oxford Street Christmas Lights switch on with Robbie Williams and at the Capital FM Jingle Bell Ball.

At the beginning of 2013, Lawson played their first headline shows in the United States and Canada selling out New York's Bowery Ballroom, The Troubadour in LA and The Mod Club in Canada. In February, they embarked on the Chapman Square tour, playing 18 sold-out shows in the UK and Ireland. While working on new tracks for the repack of Chapman Square, they visited Southeast Asia and Australia as well as announcing numerous festival dates including T in the Park, V Festival and Hard Rock Calling for the second year running and the Isle of Wight Festival for the first time.

=== 2013: Chapman Square – Chapter II ===
"Brokenhearted", featuring American rapper B.o.B, was released as the lead single from the repackaged version of Chapman Square in July 2013, reaching number six in the UK. B.o.B flew over to the UK to perform "Brokenhearted" with the band at Wembley Stadium for the Capital FM Summertime Ball. The band announced their second single, "Juliet", while on tour in the US for the second time in 2013. The track was released on 13 October 2013. British model and actress Kelly Brook stars as the titular character in the video. The band were included in the line-up of the iTunes Festival 2013, opening for Jessie J. Lawson began their biggest headline tour to date, the Everywhere We Go Tour, in September 2013. The repackaged version of their debut album titled Chapman Square – Chapter II was released on 21 October 2013. The reissue featured all twelve of the songs from the standard edition of Chapman Square (though not the full sixteen of the deluxe edition), plus six new songs. The deluxe edition of Chapman Square – Chapter II includes a second disc including acoustic songs and a short tour film.

In December 2013, an official mobile trivia game was launched for the band by SoshiGames of Birmingham, UK. The game tests the player's knowledge of the band, the members and their music.

=== 2014–2016: "Roads", Lawson EP and Perspective ===
In 2014, Lawson completed writing material for their second studio album and travelled to Nashville, Tennessee, to record it at Blackbird Studios. The recording process was interrupted after lead singer Andy Brown was hospitalised with liver failure, resulting in the sessions being put on hold. The album was initially expected to be released in 2015, and its title, Perspective was announced that year.

In March 2015, Lawson announced "Roads" as the lead single from the forthcoming album. A lyric video was released on 11 March, followed by the single on 24 May. "Roads" reached number 11 on the UK Singles Chart. In October, the band released their self-titled extended play, Lawson. The EP was issued in different versions across territories, with the Australian and New Zealand editions including additional tracks from the deluxe edition of Chapman Square.

Lawson toured the UK on their "Winter 2015" tour, performing live while continuing work on their second album.

In January 2016, Lawson announced "Money" as their next single. Its music video was released on 4 February, ahead of the single's release on 18 March. "Where My Love Goes" followed on 13 May, with a music video depicting Brown proposing to his girlfriend. The single peaked at number 83 on both the Official Singles Sales Chart and the Official Singles Downloads Chart.

Perspective was released on 8 July 2016 through Polydor Records and Global Talent. The album reached number 23 on the UK Albums Chart and number 13 on the Scottish Albums Chart. Following its release, Lawson continued to perform live throughout 2016.

The band were subsequently dropped from their joint record deal with Polydor and Global Talent.

=== 2017–2021: CMD Z ===
Following the release of their second studio album, Perspective, in 2016, Lawson entered a period of inactivity as the members pursued other projects. In 2017, lead singer Andy Brown announced that he had signed a deal with Decca Records to release a solo country album, clarifying on social media that Lawson had not split up and that he was using the time to focus on his solo career.

On 11 September 2018, Lawson announced a one-off concert to mark the sixth anniversary of their debut album, Chapman Square, performing the album in full on 23 October. After the show sold out within ten seconds, the band announced on 24 September that it had been moved to the larger Shepherd's Bush Empire, citing strong demand for tickets.

Lawson returned in April 2020 as they announced that they had signed to Cooking Vinyl and released "Lovers" on 17 April, their first single in four years. The song peaked at number 95 on the UK Singles Downloads Chart but did not enter the main UK Singles Chart. It was followed by "Animals", "She Don't Even Know" and "Four Letters" as the band prepared their third studio album, CMD Z.

Originally scheduled for release in May 2021, CMD Z was delayed because of the COVID-19 pandemic. CMD Z was released on 2 July 2021, five years after Perspective. It did not enter the UK Albums Chart, but reached number 25 on the Scottish Albums Chart and number five on the Official Independent Albums Chart.

To promote CMD Z, Lawson embarked on a UK tour in October and November 2021, their first headline tour in six years. Before the tour began, the band announced that bassist Ryan Fletcher would be unable to join them. In a statement on social media, they said they supported his decision and hoped to have him back on stage soon. Their friend Rich stood in for Fletcher during the tour.

Their official social media accounts have been inactive since the tour.

== Members ==
- Andy Brown (born 8 May 1987 in Fazakerley, Liverpool) is the lead singer and guitarist of the band. He is the oldest member of group and previously dated Mollie King from the Saturdays. He used to be in the boy band Avenue along with Max George of the Wanted. He attended St. Bede's High School, Ormskirk and Winstanley College, Wigan.
- Adam "James" Pitts (born 24 December 1990 in Brighton) is the drummer of the band. He is the youngest member of Lawson.
- Joel Gilchrist Peat (born 27 June 1990 in Mansfield, Nottinghamshire) plays lead guitar. He and Ryan attended the same university.
- Ryan "Gary" Fletcher (born 9 January 1990 in Chesterfield, Derbyshire) is the bass guitarist of the band. He and Joel attended the same university (ACM).

== Discography ==
Lawson discography
- Studio albums: 3
- Extended plays: 2
- Singles: 17
- Music videos: 15

=== Studio albums ===
Title	Details	Peak chart positions			Certifications
Title	Details	UK	IRL	SCO	Certifications
Chapman Square	Released: 22 October 2012; Label: Polydor, Global Talent; Formats: CD, digital download	4	23	4	BPI: Gold
Perspective	Released: 8 July 2016; Label: Polydor, Global Talent; Formats: CD, digital download	23	—	13	
CMD Z	Released: 2 July 2021; Label: Lawson Media, Cooking Vinyl; Formats: CD, digital download	— (Note: CMD Z did not enter the Official Albums Chart, but peaked at number fifteen on the Official Albums Sales Chart.)	—	25	

=== Extended plays ===
Title	Details	Peak chart positions
Title	Details	AUS
iTunes Festival: London 2013	Released: 2013; Label: Global Talent, Polydor; Format: Digital download	—
Lawson	Released: 2 October 2015; Label: Polydor; Format: Digital download, CD	76

=== Singles ===
Title	Year	Peak chart positions					Certifications	Album
Title	Year	UK	IRL	HUN	POL	SCO	Certifications	Album
"When She Was Mine"	2012	4	46	—	—	4		Chapman Square
"Taking Over Me"	2012	3	32	39	—	3		Chapman Square
"Standing in the Dark"	2012	6	50	—	—	5	BPI: Silver	Chapman Square
"Learn to Love Again"	2012	13	50	—	—	11		Chapman Square
"Brokenhearted" (featuring B.o.B)	2013	6	12	40	—	5		Chapman Square – Chapter II
"Juliet"	2013	3	32	—	3	3		Chapman Square – Chapter II
"Roads" (Note: "Roads" and "Under the Sun" also appear on their EP Lawson)	2015	11	—	—	—	4		Perspective
"Under the Sun"	2015	—	—	—	—	—		Perspective
"Money"	2016	—	—	—	—	—		Perspective
"Where My Love Goes"	2016	—	—	—	—	92		Perspective
"Lovers"	2020	— (Note: "Lovers" did not enter the Official Singles Chart, but peaked at number ninety-five on the Official Singles Downloads Chart.)	—	—	—	—		CMD Z
"Animals"	2020	—	—	—	—	—		CMD Z
"She Don’t Even Know"	2020	—	—	—	—	—		CMD Z
"Four Letters"	2020	—	—	—	—	—		CMD Z
"Hell Yeah"	2020	—	—	—	—	—		CMD Z
"Killing Me" (featuring Alyssa Bonagura)	2021	—	—	—	—	—		CMD Z
"Blind"	2021	—	—	—	—	—		CMD Z
"—" denotes single that did not chart or was not released.

=== Promotional singles ===
Title	Year	Album
"Love Is You"	2015	Perspective
"We Are Kings"	2015	Lawson

=== Music videos ===
Title	Year	Director
"When She Was Mine"	2012	Declan Whitebloom
"Taking Over Me"	2012	Going Home
"Standing in the Dark"	2012	Nick Bartleet
"Learn To Love Again"	2012	Shane Drake
"Brokenhearted" (featuring B.o.B)	2013	Declan Whitebloom
"Going Home"	2013	Carly Cussen
"Roads"	2015	Going Home
"Under the Sun"	2015	Embryo
"We Are Kings"	2015	Embryo
"Money"	2016	Carly Cussen
"Where My Love Goes"	2016	Mike Baldwin
"Lovers"	2020	Adam Pitts
"Animals"	2020	
"She Don't Even Know"	2020	
"Hell Yeah"	2020	
