= Standing in the Dark (song) =

2012 single by Lawson

Single by Lawson

from the album Chapman Square
- Released: 14 October 2012
- Genre: Pop rock
- Length: 3:23
- Label: Polydor; Global Talent
- Songwriters: Andy Brown; Ryan Fletcher; Ki Fitzgerald; Dave Morgan
- Producers: John Shanks; Jeremy Wheatley; Ki Fitzgerald

Lawson singles chronology
| "Taking Over Me" (2012) | "Standing in the Dark" (2012) | "Learn to Love Again" (2013) |

"Standing in the Dark" is the third single by British pop rock band Lawson, from their debut studio album, Chapman Square. The song was released in the United Kingdom on 14 October 2012, via Polydor Records. The song first premiered on BBC Radio 1 on 1 September.

== Background ==
In an interview with Capital FM, Lawson frontman Andy Brown revealed that "Standing in the Dark" is about his ex-girlfriend, the Saturdays member Mollie King and that he wrote the song with bandmate Ryan Fletcher after seeing photographs of her with someone else. He said: "What happened was, we split up and I wrote quite a few songs about it. It was hard because she just started going out with a ridiculously good looking guy after me. 'When She Was Mine' was a song about that, but 'Standing in the Dark' was the first song – I wrote it with Ryan on the day we saw her with this new guy in the paper and stuff. It did hurt me hard."

== Music video ==
On 2 September 2012, a lyric video for the song was released via the band's Vevo channel on YouTube. The full music video premiered on ChartShowTV on 14 September, however, the band announced that the YouTube premiere would be delayed by ten days so that it could follow an important announcement. A teaser for the video was published to Vevo on 16 September. A second teaser was published on 18 September. On 20 September, a behind the scenes video for the song was released. Directed by Nick Bartleet, the official video was released on 24 September, at a total length of three minutes and forty-eight seconds. The video features band member Andy performing the track in his flat, while the rest of the band perform in a deserted car park, in the pouring rain.

== Track listing ==
- Digital download
1. "Standing in the Dark" – 3:23
2. "Die for You" – 3:23 (Written By: Andy Brown, Ki Fitzgerald, Gary Clark)
3. "Getting Nowhere" – 4:39 (Written By: Andy Brown, Ki Fitzgerald, Harry Sommerdahl)
4. "Standing in the Dark" (Acoustic) – 3:16
5. "The A Team" (Pre-Order Only) – 2:36
- CD single
1. "Standing in the Dark" – 3:23
2. "Die for You" – 3:23
- 7-inch vinyl
1. "Standing in the Dark" – 3:23
2. "Standing in the Dark" (Andi Durrant & Steve More Remix) – 3:42

== Charts ==
| Chart (2012) | Peak position |
|---|---|
| Europe (Euro Digital Songs) | 11 |
| Ireland (IRMA) | 50 |
| Scotland Singles (OCC) | 5 |
| UK Singles (OCC) | 6 |

=== Year-end charts ===
| Chart (2012) | Position |
|---|---|
| UK Singles (Official Charts Company) | 161 |

== Release history ==
| Region | Date | Format | Label |
|---|---|---|---|
| United Kingdom | 14 October 2012 | Digital download, CD single | Polydor, Global Talent |
| Malaysia | 28 October 2012 | Digital download | Universal, Geffen |
