= Juliet (Lawson song) =

Single by Lawson

from the album Chapman Square Chapter II
- Released: 11 October 2013
- Recorded: 2013
- Genre: Pop rock, reggae
- Length: 3:14
- Label: Polydor; Global Talent
- Songwriter(s): Andy Brown; Carl Falk; Eric Turner; Michel Zitron
- Producer(s): Carl Falk

Lawson singles chronology
"Brokenhearted" (2013)	"Juliet" (2013)	"Roads" (2015)

"Juliet" is the sixth single by British pop rock band Lawson. The single was released as the second single from the re-issue of their debut studio album, Chapman Square (2012). The song was released on 11 October 2013, via Polydor Records. It debuted and peaked at number three on the UK Singles Chart, tying with "Taking Over Me" as their highest charting single to date.

== Music video ==
Directed by Carly Cussen, the music video features model and actress, Kelly Brook, as Juliet.

== Track listing ==
- Digital download
1. "Juliet" - 3:14

== Charts ==
Chart (2013)	Peak position
Ireland (IRMA)	32
Poland (Polish Airplay Top 100)	3
Scotland (OCC)	3
UK Singles (OCC)	3

== Certifications ==
Region	Certification	Certified units/sales
United Kingdom (BPI)	Silver	200,000^{‡}
^{‡} Sales+streaming figures based on certification alone.
