= Darren Hayes discography =

Australian pop singer

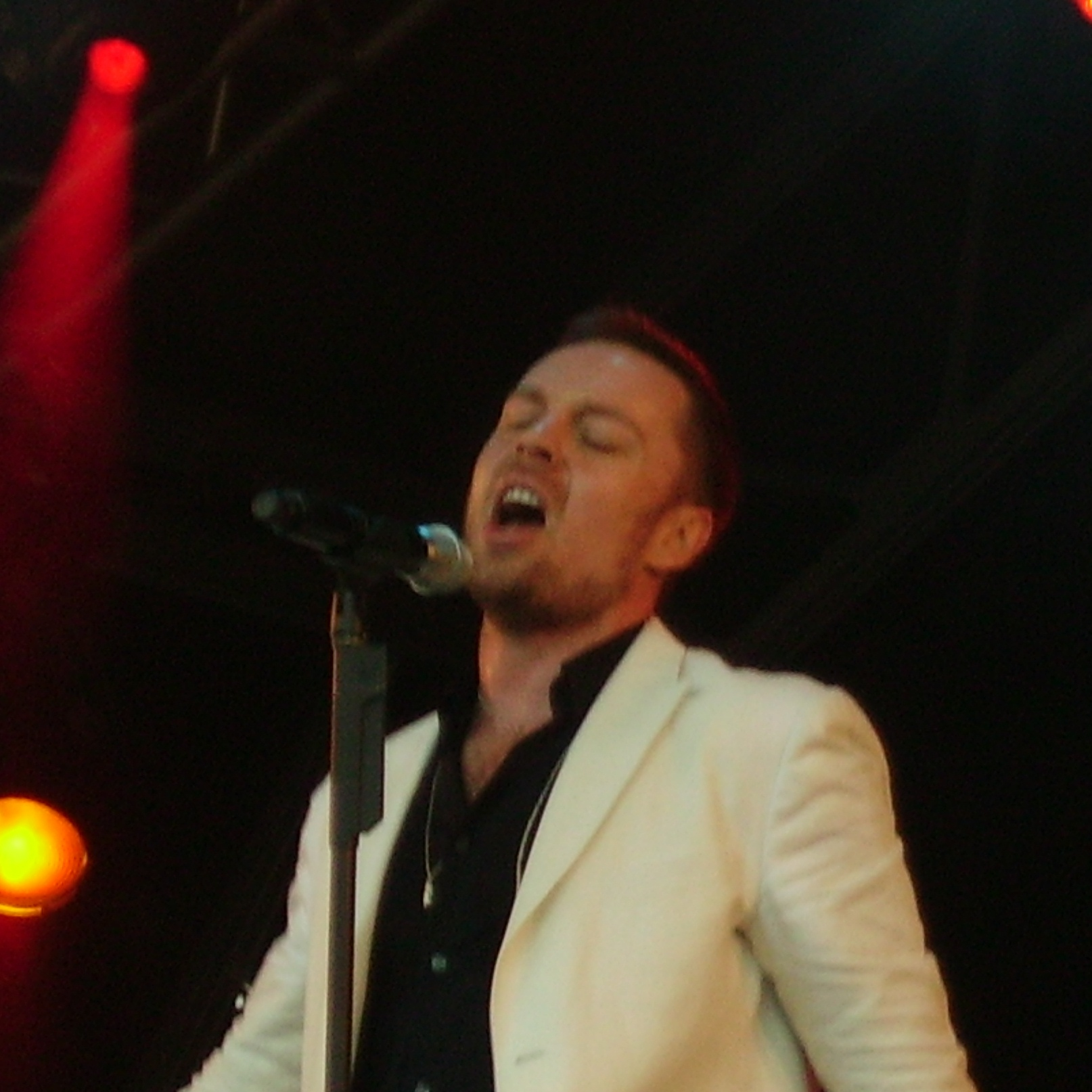
- Studio albums: 5
- Soundtrack albums: 1
- Compilation albums: 1
- Singles: 26
- Video albums: 4
- Music videos: 22

The discography of Darren Hayes, an Australian pop singer, consists of five studio albums, one compilation album, twenty-six singles, twenty-two music videos, and four video albums. He released his first two studio albums via Columbia Records, and since 2007, has released music through his own record label, Powdered Sugar. Including his work with Savage Garden, Hayes has sold more than 39 million albums worldwide, of which five million have been sold during his solo career. His five studio albums include Spin (2002), The Tension and the Spark (2004), both of which were released by Columbia; Hayes left the label and went on to release four studio albums, This Delicate Thing We've Made (2007), Secret Codes and Battleships (2011), and his most recent studio album, Homosexual, which was released on 7 October 2022.

== Albums ==
=== Studio albums ===
Title	Details	Peak chart positions					Certifications (sales thresholds)
Title	Details	AUS	NZ	SWE	UK	US	Certifications (sales thresholds)
Spin	Released: 18 March 2002; Labels: Columbia; Format: CD, cassette	3	22	7	2	35	ARIA: Platinum; BPI: Platinum
The Tension and the Spark	Released: 13 September 2004; Labels: Columbia; Format: CD, digital download	8	—	32	13	—	ARIA: Gold
This Delicate Thing We've Made	Released: 20 August 2007; Label: Powdered Sugar; Format: CD, digital download	19	—	—	14	— (Note: "This Delicate Thing We've Made" did not enter the US Billboard Hot 200, but peaked at number 44 on the Billboard Top Independent Albums)	
Secret Codes and Battleships	Released: 17 October 2011; Labels: Mercury, EMI, Powdered Sugar; Format: CD, digital download	10	—	—	29	—	
Homosexual	Released: 7 October 2022; Labels: Powdered Sugar; Format: CD, digital download, streaming	— (Note: Homosexual did not enter the ARIA Albums Chart, but peaked at number 6 on the ARIA Digital Album Chart.)	—	—	82	—	
"—" denotes releases that did not chart or were not released in that country.

=== Collaboration albums ===
Title	Details
We Are Smug (with Robert Conley as "We Are Smug")	Released: 8 May 2009; Label: Powdered Sugar; Format: CD & Digital download iTunes & Amazon

=== Video albums ===
Title	Details	Peak chart positions
Title	Details	AUS
Too Close for Comfort: Tour Film	Released: 13 January 2006; Labels: Columbia; Format: DVD	—
A Big Night in with Darren Hayes	Released: 13 August 2006; Labels: Columbia; Format: DVD	—
The Time Machine Tour	Released: 21 July 2008; Label: Absolute; Format: DVD	29
This Delicate Film We've Made	Released: 2 February 2009; Labels: Universal Music Operations; Format: DVD, digital download	—
"—" denotes releases that did not chart or were not released in that country.

== Singles ==
=== As lead artist ===
List of singles as lead artist, with selected chart positions and certifications, showing year released and album name
Year	Song	Peak chart positions						Certifications (sales thresholds)	Album
Year	Song	AUS	NZ	SWE	UK	US Dance	US	Certifications (sales thresholds)	Album
2002	"Insatiable"	3	1	8	8	11	77	ARIA: Gold	Spin
2002	"Strange Relationship"	16	44	25	15	—	—		Spin
2002	"Crush (1980 Me)"	19	—	55	19	—	—		Spin
2002	"I Miss You"	25	—	28	20	—	—		Spin
2004	"Pop!ular"	3	—	30	12	1	—	ARIA: Gold	The Tension and the Spark
2004	"Darkness"	40	—	—	—	—	—		The Tension and the Spark
2005	"So Beautiful"	7	—	55	15	—	—		Truly Madly Completely
2007	"Step into the Light"	—	—	—	—	5	—		This Delicate Thing We've Made
2007	"On the Verge of Something Wonderful"	29	—	—	20	—	—		This Delicate Thing We've Made
2007	"Me, Myself and (I)"	— (Note: "Me, Myself and (I)" did not enter the Australian Singles Chart Top 100, but peaked at number 48 on the Australian ARIA Physical Singles Chart.)	—	—	59	—	—		This Delicate Thing We've Made
2007	"Who Would Have Thought"	—	—	—	— (Note: "Who Would Have Thought" did not enter the UK Singles Chart, but debuted and peaked at number 45 on the UK Physical Singles Chart.)	—	—		This Delicate Thing We've Made
2008	"Casey"	—	—	—	108	—	—		This Delicate Thing We've Made
2011	"Talk Talk Talk"	79	—	—	— (Note: "Talk Talk Talk" did not enter the UK Singles Chart, but debuted and peaked at number 5 on the UK Physical Singles Chart.)	—	—		Secret Codes and Battleships
2011	"Bloodstained Heart"	80	—	—	181	—	—		Secret Codes and Battleships
2011	"Black Out the Sun"	—	—	—	101	—	—		Secret Codes and Battleships
2012	"Stupid Mistake"	—	—	—	— (Note: "Stupid Mistake" did not enter the UK Singles Chart, but debuted and peaked at number 4 on the UK Physical Singles Chart.)	—	—		Secret Codes and Battleships
2022	"Let's Try Being in Love"	— (Note: "Let's Try Being in Love" did not enter the ARIA Singles Chart, but debuted at number 9 on the Australian Independent Singles Chart.)	—	—	— (Note: "Let's Try Being in Love" debuted at number 96 on the Official UK Singles Download Chart Top 100 and at number 98 on the Official UK Singles Sales Chart Top 100, both after 24 hours of release.)	—	—		Homosexual
2022	"Do You Remember?"	—	—	—	—	—	—		Homosexual
2022	"Poison Blood"	— (Note: "Poison Blood" did not enter the ARIA Singles Chart, but debuted at number 15 on the Australian Independent Singles Chart.)	—	—	—	—	—		Homosexual
2022	"All You Pretty Things"	—	—	—	—	—	—		Homosexual
2023	"Feels Like It's Over"	—	—	—	—	—	—		Homosexual
"—" denotes releases that did not chart or were not released in that country.

=== As featured artist ===
List of singles as featured artist, with selected chart positions and certifications, showing year released and album name
Year	Title	Peak chart positions								Album
Year	Title	AUS	AUT	GER	NLD	NZ	SWI	UK	US	Album
2001	"What's Going On" (with Artists Against AIDS)	38	51	35	26	18	16	6	27	Non-album singles
2014	"This Woman's Work" (as part of Hope for Isla and Jude)	79	—	—	—	—	—	—	—	Non-album singles
2019	"I Never Cried So Much in My Whole Life" (with Cub Sport)	—	—	—	—	—	—	—	—	Non-album singles
2023	"I Want You" (Peking Duk featuring Darren Hayes)	—	—	—	—	—	—	—	—	Non-album singles
2026	"Blind" (Bachelor Girl featuring Darren Hayes)	—	—	—	—	—	—	—	—	Waiting for the Day: Artist Sessions
"—" denotes releases that did not chart or were not released in that country.

== Other appearances ==
Year	Song	Album
1999	"Last Christmas" (Rosie O'Donnell featuring Darren Hayes)	A Rosie Christmas
2000	"O Sole Mio" (Pavarotti featuring Darren Hayes)	Pavarotti & Friends
2000	"All You Need Is Love" (along with Pavarotti and other artists)	Pavarotti & Friends
2002	"Do You Believe ?" (Specificus featuring Darren Hayes)	The Specificus EP
2003	"Lift Me Up" (Olivia Newton-John featuring Darren Hayes)	2 (Olivia Newton-John album)
2004	"Strange Magic"	Ella Enchanted soundtrack
2008	"When You Say You Love Me" (Human Nature featuring Darren Hayes)	A Symphony of Hits
2010	"Not Even Close"	He Will Have His Way
2011	"Love Hangover" (Wayne G featuring Darren Hayes)	Remixxer
2017	"I Wish U Heaven"	I Wish U Heaven
2021	"Cold to Me" (Louis La Roche featuring Darren Hayes)	We're Not So Different

== Music videos ==
Year	Music video	Director(s)	Notes
2002	"Insatiable"	Alek Keshishian	
2002	"Strange Relationship"	Tommy O'Haver	
2002	"I Miss You"	Grant Marshall	The video features Australian actress Rose Byrne.
2003	"Crush (1980 Me)"	Grant Marshall	
2004	"Pop!ular"	Evan Bernard	The crew were threatened with arrest for not having the proper permits to film on Oxford Street in London.
2004	"Darkness"	Tim Royes / Lance Bangs	
2005	"So Beautiful"	Meiert Avis	
2007	"Step into the Light"	Damian Hale	
2007	"Who Would Have Thought"	Richard Cullen	
2007	"On the Verge of Something Wonderful"	The Saline Project	Shot in Los Angeles, the video features supermodel Janice Dickinson.
2007	"Me, Myself and (I)"	Darren Hayes, Richard Cullen	
2008	"Casey"	Damian Hale	
2008	"Neverland"	Darren Hayes, Richard Cullen	
2011	"Talk Talk Talk"	Richard Cullen	
2011	"Black Out the Sun"	Grant Marshall	Shot on a sound stage at Village Roadshow Studios in Queensland using vintage anamorphic lenses from the 1970s and featuring choreography by director Grant's sister Claire Marshall.
2011	"Bloodstained Heart"	Chris Cottam	Filmed in the United Kingdom.
2012	"Stupid Mistake"	Richard Cullen	
2022	"Let's Try Being in Love"	Andrew Putschoegl	
2022	"Do You Remember?"	Darren Hayes & Madeleine Coghlan	
2022	"Poison Blood"	Alex Hyner	
2022	"All You Pretty Things"	Darren Hayes	
2023	"Feels Like It's Over"	Andrew Huebscher	

== See also ==
- Savage Garden discography
