= Homosexual (album) =

Studio album by Darren Hayes
- Released: 7 October 2022
- Length: 77:42
- Label: Powdered Sugar
- Producer: Darren Hayes

Darren Hayes chronology
Secret Codes and Battleships (2011)	Homosexual (2022)

Singles from Homosexual
- 1. "Let's Try Being in Love" Released: 27 January 2022; 2. "Do You Remember?" Released: 11 March 2022; 3. "Poison Blood" Released: 6 June 2022; 4. "All You Pretty Things" Released: 19 August 2022; 5. "Feels Like It's Over" Released: 12 May 2023

Homosexual is the fifth studio album by Australian singer-songwriter Darren Hayes. It was released on 7 October 2022 and is Hayes' third studio album to be released on his own record label, Powdered Sugar. The album produced five singles: "Let's Try Being in Love", "Do You Remember?", "Poison Blood", "All You Pretty Things" and "Feels Like It's Over". Homosexual is the first of Hayes' studio albums where he has written, composed, produced and performed entirely by himself.

== Background ==
On 26 January 2022, Hayes released a new single, "Let's Try Being in Love". "I wanted to show I love the feminine in me, be proud of the gay me. There's a dance scene that is so passionate, everything's alive and thriving and blooming. That's how I feel in general about music. And that's a hugely sharp contrast to how I felt 10 years ago." On naming the album Homosexual, Hayes told Attitude magazine: "The most obvious [reason] is that I'm a gay man who grew up in an era when that word was used to shame and vilify people like me, so I wanted to reclaim it [...] In 2022 I'm living in a time and in a country where the freedoms of LGBTQI+ people are more at risk than they've ever been.

Hayes told Music Feeds "My new album was born from a desire to rid myself of the grief I developed over the years I lost to shame growing up in a world where being gay was met with rejection and condemnation. I wanted to revisit my teenage years with the wisdom of a proud 50-year-old gay man and revisit my youthful memories and view them through this new peach-tinted lens of joy." He went on to say "The production on my album is deeply inspired by 1985 to 1987, memories of listening to the 12-inch extended mixes of my favourite Madonna or George Michael songs.

== Production ==
In a 2023 interview with The Music, Hayes shared: "I don't play the guitar, but there are guitar solos on this record; how did I do it? I sang and put my voice through a guitar amp and distorted it. These wonderful limitations made me think and be creative within constraints and feel like I was 19 again and trying to just work out how to track my voice or how to make demos [...] When I write music, I see visuals and create worlds. For this album, for example, I created the visual world first. I bought clothing from vintage sellers online from the mid-1980s, I was obsessed with the colour peach, and I had folders of clip art and imagery online that evoked a period in time that looked exactly like the music sounded."

== Singles ==
The lead single from the album was "Let's Try Being in Love", which was released on 27 January 2022. The official music video stars Scott Evans as Hayes' lover. The video was directed by Andrew Putschoegl. In the United Kingdom, "Let's Try Being in Love" debuted and peaked at number 96 on the Official UK Singles Download Chart Top 100 and peaked at number 9 on the Australian Independent chart.

"Do You Remember?" was released as the second single on 11 March 2022. The music video premiered on 17 March 2022 and was directed by Hayes and Madeleine Coghlan.

On 6 June 2022, Hayes released "Poison Blood", which details his life living with depression, and others affected by it. Hayes released the official "Poison Blood" music video on 26 June 2022, announcing UK Tour dates on the same day. The video was directed by Alex Hyner and premiered online on 26 June 2022.

"All You Pretty Things" was released as the fourth single on 19 August 2022 and was the final single before the parent album's release. Hayes dedicated the track to the memory of the victims of the 2016 Pulse nightclub shooting. The video was released on 30 September 2022 and opened with the message "To those we lost at Pulse".

The official music video for "Feels Like It's Over" premiered on 1 May 2023, directed by Andrew Huebscher.An edited version of the song was released as the fifth single on 12 May 2023.

== Critical reception ==
Professional ratings
Review scores
Source	Rating
The Courier-Mail	3.5/5 stars
Entertainment Focus	4/5 stars
The Independent	5/5 stars
Retro Pop Magazine	4/5 stars
Sputnikmusic	3.5/5 stars
The Sydney Morning Herald	3.5/5 stars
Metro Weekly	4/5 stars

Giselle Au-Nhien Nguyen, reviewing the album for The Sydney Morning Herald, gave the album three-and-a-half stars and wrote that "there's something thrilling about hearing a musician who’s been a mainstay in Australian pop for so long go his own way, with little care for others' expectations. There's a real sense of hard-won independence on this record, a sense of personal liberation." The Independent gave the LP 5/5 stars, calling it a "proud and simple reclamation". Billboard opined Hayes "employs the blissful, gay-club-adjacent dance-pop of the early aughts to dissect his own trauma [...] It’s neither happy nor sad — it’s honest." Entertainment Focus rated the album 4/5 stars and called it a “triumph”, adding that Hayes “deserve[d] to be held high among the best pop artists in the music industry”. Metro Weekly rated Homosexual 4/5 stars, praising the "celebration of identity and freedom", adding that the album "feels like Darren Hayes [is] at his most free and unencumbered as an artist."

== Chart performance ==
Homosexual debuted at number 16 on the Australian Artist Albums Chart.

On 10 October 2022, Homosexual placed at number 19 on the midweek UK Albums Chart; this would have been Hayes' highest UK album entry since This Delicate Thing We've Made peaked at number 14 in 2007, and his fourth studio album to reach the top 20. However, when the UK Albums Chart was released on 14 October 2022, Homosexual debuted at number 82, as well as at number 3 on the UK Album Downloads Chart and number 13 on the UK Album Sales Chart.

On 10 February 2023, the vinyl issue of the album was released. In the UK, this saw Homosexual chart at number 60 on the UK Album Sales chart and number 23 on the Vinyl Albums chart.

== Tour ==
On 2 March 2022, Hayes announced the "Do You Remember?" Tour that would be performed in six Australian cities between January and February 2023 and would feature songs from his musical career as part of Savage Garden and as a solo artist. On 26 June 2022, Hayes announced UK tour dates, also for 2023. On 7 October, Hayes announced a North American leg of the "Do You Remember?" Tour, consisting of dates in Toronto, New York and Los Angeles.

=== Set list ===
The following set list is representative of the show in London at the London Palladium on 28 March 2023. It may not represent the setlist from all of the shows.

1. "Homosapien" / "Chained to You" / "Pop!ular"
2. "Affirmation"
3. "The Animal Song"
4. "Insatiable" / "Forget Me Nots" / "Fastlove"
5. "All You Pretty Things" / "Step into the Light"
6. "To the Moon and Back" / "Smalltown Boy"
7. "Two Beds and a Coffee Machine"
8. "I Don't Know You Anymore"
9. "Poison Blood"
10. "True Blue" / "I Knew I Loved You"
11. "Casey"
12. "Do You Remember?"
13. "Homosexual (Part One)"
14. "Let's Try Being in Love"
15. "Pop!ular" / "Showing Out (Get Fresh at the Weekend)" / "All Around Me"
16. "Break Me Shake Me" / "Last Night a D.J. Saved My Life"
17. "Hey Matt"
18. "Dublin Sky"
19. "Crash and Burn"
20. "Truly Madly Deeply"

Encore

21. "I Want You"
22. "The Best Thing"

=== Tour critical reception ===
Review for the Do You Remember? tour were positive. For the Brisbane show in February 2023, Peter Gray, writing for The AU Review, rated the show 3.5/5 stars, opining "in spite of the production’s need for some tightening and polishing regarding the staging and choreography, Hayes, his open personality, and beautiful falsetto maintained the overall engagement." Brendon Veevers, reviewing for Renowned for Sound praised the "stripped back moments where Hayes really shone, as well as moments of vulnerability where the singer would let us into moments in his life and journey as a son, a singer and a proud gay man", adding the whole production "truly turned out a spectacular night filled with music, love self-acceptance and nostalgia [...] an incredible night overflowing with some of the pops finest pennings from a true superstar of pop!" Kevin Cooper, reviewing the Royal Concert Hall stop in Nottingham on 21 March 2023 for UK Music Reviews, praised Hayes' performance, claiming his "vocals had been outstanding and his stage presence captivating." Angela Pearson, for Purple Revolver, rated Do You Remember? 5/5 stars. Pearson gave Hayes a glowing review, and wrote "Darren bowing out of the limelight his talent so clearly deserves, and flourishes in, for the last 11 years was undoubtedly a vital personal choice for him, but I cannot help but mourn the lost time and potential for more music that was quashed. The fact music industry bosses perpetuated the homophobic shame he felt after he had the courage to come out is unforgivable. But, where we find Darren now feels so good - it is a privilege to have witnessed him return as his authentic self."

== Track listing ==
All tracks written, produced, composed and performed by Darren Hayes.

Homosexual track listing
No.	Title	Length
1.	"Let's Try Being in Love"	5:33
2.	"Do You Remember?"	5:43
3.	"A Little Death"	5:01
4.	"Poison Blood"	4:02
5.	"Hey Matt"	9:18
6.	"Homosexual (Act One)"	6:44
7.	"Music Video"	5:59
8.	"Euphoric Equation"	4:07
9.	"Nocturnal Animal"	4:48
10.	"Feels Like It's Over"	5:54
11.	"All You Pretty Things"	8:17
12.	"We Are Alchemists"	5:35
13.	"Homosexual (Act Two)"	6:41
Total length:		77:42

Digital bonus track
No.	Title	Length
14.	"Birth"	7:37
Total length:		85:19

== Charts ==
Chart performance for Homosexual
Chart (2022)	Peak position
Australian Artist Albums (ARIA)	16
Australian Digital Albums (ARIA)	6
Australian Physical Albums (ARIA)	32
Scottish Albums (Official Charts)	23
UK Albums (Official Charts)	82
UK Album Sales	13
UK Independent Albums (Official Charts)	6

Chart (2023)	Peak position
UK Album Sales	60
UK Vinyl Albums	28

== Release history ==
Release history and formats for Homosexual
Region	Date	Format	Catalogue	Label	Ref.
Various	7 October 2022	Digital download; streaming	—N/a	Powdered Sugar Productions Ltd	
Australia	7 October 2022	CD	POWDERCD1	Powdered Sugar Productions Ltd	
Australia	10 February 2023	LP	POWDERTW1	Powdered Sugar Productions Ltd	
