= This Delicate Film We've Made =

Video by Darren Hayes
- Released: 3 February 2009
- Recorded: 2007–08
- Genre: Animation
- Length: 86 minutes
- Label: Powdered Sugar
- Director: Richard Cullen, Hayes

Darren Hayes chronology
This Delicate Thing We've Made (2007)	This Delicate Film We've Made (2009)	Secret Codes and Battleships (2011)

Darren Hayes video chronology
The Time Machine World Tour (2008)	This Delicate Film We've Made (2009)

This Delicate Film We've Made is the first video release by Australian recording artist Darren Hayes. It's a feature-length musical film created and directed by him.

== Release ==
The DVD was released on 3 February 2009. The film is a visual realization of tracks from Hayes' third studio album, This Delicate Thing We've Made. Each track was animated and placed together in a film narrative. The film was produced by Richard Cullen and Damien Hale from the company Pixelfing. The film has no dialogue and includes minimal sound effects.

== Track listing ==
1. "A Fear of Falling Under"
2. "Who Would Have Thought"
3. "Waking the Monster"
4. "How to Build a Time Machine"
5. "Neverland"
6. "Step Into the Light"
7. "Casey"
8. "Setting Sun"
9. "Words"
10. "A Hundred Challenging Things a Boy Can Do"
11. "Maybe"
12. "A Conversation With God"
- Bonus Promo Videos
1. "On the Verge of Something Wonderful"
2. "Me Myself and (I)"

== Awards ==
- In 2008, "Who Would Have Thought" music video was nominated for British Interactive Media Association "BIMA" Awards, in the category Best Film and Animation.
- In 2009, DVD deluxe version art, made by Australian designer Jane Wallace, received Best Graphic Design prize at Desktop Create Awards.
