= Crush (1980 Me) =

2002 single by Darren Hayes

- UK CD1 cover

Single by Darren Hayes

from the album Spin
- B-side: "Right Dead Back on It"
- Released: 19 August 2002
- Genre: Bubblegum pop
- Length: 4:01
- Label: Roadshow; Sony
- Songwriters: Darren Hayes; Robert Conley
- Producer: Greg Bieck

Darren Hayes singles chronology
"Strange Relationship" (2002)	"Crush (1980 Me)" (2002)	"I Miss You" (2002)

"Crush (1980 Me)" is the third single released by Australian singer-songwriter Darren Hayes from his debut studio album, Spin (2002). Written by Hayes and Robert Conley and produced by Greg Bieck, it was released on 19 August 2002 in Australia. The track is a homage to the 1980s, featuring a synthesized pop sound, vocoded vocals, and references stars of the period like Cyndi Lauper, Simon Le Bon of Duran Duran, and the Eurythmics. The track's "Crush on Holiday" remix utilized samples of Madonna's 1983 breakthrough single "Holiday".

"Crush" became a moderate success, entering the top 20 in both Australia and the United Kingdom. The song is regarded as a huge shift for Hayes in sound and shaped the form of what would be his next studio album The Tension and the Spark (2004).

== Critical reception ==
Can't Stop the Pop gave the single a positive review writing, "On paper, Crush (1980 Me)'s lyrics read like an inventory of '80s references. Yet, although there's little narrative structure to the verses, the way they're organised is a masterful show of pop composition. It never feels like a checklist of trademarks being mindlessly reeled off. The vocals are gently infused with subtle distortion and overlapped so that they jump from ear to ear, leaving no gaps between each line. Darren Hayes may well be indulging in his own nostalgia, but the production puts the listener right there with him in the centre of an all-consuming wall of sound."

== Music video ==
The music video is set in the mid-1980s and features Hayes in an outdoor cinema playing Space Invaders. The clip introduces the names of people including Hayes, Corey, a guy who thinks he's cool, Cyndi, Corey's girlfriend who adores Hayes, and Martha, a shy girl on the counter. Outside the bar, there are many people break-dancing and skateboarding. A crowd are amazed with Hayes' performance on Space Invaders and he breaks a record by getting to the hundredth level. After the game, Hayes chooses Martha over Cyndi and both of them enjoy a movie in the evening as a shooting star ends the clip. It was directed by Grant Marshall.

== Track listings and formats ==
Australian CD single

1. "Crush (1980 Me)" (Album Version) – 4:01
2. "Crush (1980 Me)" (Mayday "Disco Biscuit" Mix) – 3:08
3. "Strange Relationship" (F3 Mix) – 3:41
4. "Right Dead Back on It" (Original Demo Recording) – 3:49
5. "Insatiable" (Acoustic Version) (Live in the Capital Radio Living Room) – 5:22

UK CD1 – Enhanced

1. "Crush (1980 Me)" – 4:00
2. "Crush (1980 Me)" (May Day Mix) – 3:06
3. "I Miss You" (Dallas Austin Remix) – 4:12
4. "Crush (1980 Me)" (Video)

UK CD2

1. "Crush (1980 Me)" (Radio Edit) – 3:43
2. "Crush (1980 Me)" (Crush on Holiday Mix) – 4:24
3. "Crush (1980 Me)" (Instrumental Version) – 4:03

European CD single

1. "Crush (1980 Me)" – 4:00
2. "Crush (1980 Me)" (May Day Mix) – 3:06

European maxi-CD single – Enhanced

1. "Crush (1980 Me)" – 4:00
2. "Crush (1980 Me)" (Crush on Holiday Mix) – 4:23
3. "I Miss You" (Dallas Austin Remix) – 4:12
4. "Crush (1980 Me)" (May Day Mix) – 3:06
5. "Crush (1980 Me)" (Video Version) – 3:40

== Personnel ==
Personnel are taken from the Spin booklet.

- Darren Hayes – lead and background vocals
- Walter Afanasieff and Robert Conley – keyboards, bass, drum, and rhythm programming
- Robert Conley – programming and vocal engineering
- Nick Thomas – engineer

== Charts ==
Weekly chart performance for "Crush (1980 Me)"
Chart (2002–2003)	Peak Position
Australia (ARIA)	19
Europe (Eurochart Hot 100)	71
Sweden (Sverigetopplistan)	55
UK Singles (OCC)	19

== Release history ==
Release dates and formats for "Crush (1980 Me)"
Region	Date	Format(s)	Label(s)	Ref.
Australia	19 August 2002	CD	Roadshow; Sony	
United Kingdom	20 January 2003	CD	Columbia	
