= We Are Smug (album) =

Studio album by Darren Hayes and Robert Conley
- Released: 8 May 2009
- Recorded: 2007–2009
- Genre: Pop, electronica
- Length: 40:59
- Label: Powdered Sugar
- Producer: Darren Hayes, Robert Conley

Darren Hayes chronology
This Delicate Thing We've Made (2007)	We Are Smug (2009)	Secret Codes and Battleships (2011)

We Are Smug is a collaborative studio album recorded by Australian singer-songwriter Darren Hayes and producer and songwriter Robert Conley under the pseudonym We Are Smug. Originally intended as an anonymous secret side project for Hayes to experiment with new sounds, the album was given away for free for a limited period via digital download as a gift to fans on Hayes' birthday on 8 May 2009 but all free links have since been removed. Hayes has recently said he intends to commercially release the album with a bonus song at some point in the future. The album is an eclectic and experimental vehicle where Hayes adopted various personas and experimented with vocal delivery and genre in a way he had never done as a mainstream artist. It is unique as a recording because Hayes shares vocal duties with Conley, sometimes swapping out the lead for backing vocals. Hayes takes the lead on about half the album at varying times changing his voice, alternating between a high falsetto, a lower raspy tone, experimenting with hip hop and Beach Boys styled harmonies.

Conley and Hayes originally began working together when they co-wrote and co- produced the track "Crush (1980 Me)" for Hayes' 2002 debut solo album, Spin. Conley went on to be the main collaborator with Hayes on the 2004 album The Tension and the Spark and was credited as one of many co-writers and collaborators on the 2007 album This Delicate Thing We've Made. Conley's most recent work with Hayes can be found on the 2011 album Secret Codes and Battleships where he is credited as a co-writer and co-producer on several songs. Chronologically, We Are Smug is a project that began in the period after The Tension and the Spark when Hayes severed ties with Columbia Records and first became an independent artist. Much of the songwriting and recording was completed prior to the commencement of work on Hayes' 2007 album This Delicate Thing We've Made. The songs were shelved while Hayes finished and promoted the double album This Delicate Thing We've Made. Immediately after, Hayes and Conley committed to finish work on the secret project, enlisting the help of producer and longtime Hayes collaborator Justin Shave to mix a 10-track album of songs. Titled We Are Smug, it was given away for free for a limited time on Hayes' birthday on 8 May 2009, but all free links have since been removed.

The album was re-released in 2013 with a new song called 'Riot'. It is available to download from iTunes with that extra track.

== Track listing ==
All songs written and produced by Darren Hayes and Robert Conley except 'Shit on the Radio' written by Darren Hayes, Robert Conley and Matthew Kelly.

No.	Title	Performer(s)	Length
1.	"Look What We've Started"	Robert Conley and Darren Hayes	4:21
2.	"Words That I Can't Say"	Robert Conley and Darren Hayes	3:41
3.	"Hot Tub Blues"	Darren Hayes	4:25
4.	"Good Dress"	Darren Hayes	3:06
5.	"Shit on the Radio"	Darren Hayes	3:44
6.	"Tear It Up"	Darren Hayes	3:49
7.	"Never Be the Same Again"	Darren Hayes	5:12
8.	"Watching Me Watching You"	Darren Hayes	5:11
9.	"Fire It Up"	Robert Conley	3:19
10.	"The Pressure"	Robert Conley and Darren Hayes	4:11
Total length:			40:59

Re-release track listing
No.	Title	Performer(s)	Length
1.	"Look What We've Started"	Robert Conley and Darren Hayes	4:21
2.	"Hot Tub Blues"	Darren Hayes	4:25
3.	"Good Dress"	Darren Hayes	3:06
4.	"Words That I Can't Say"	Robert Conley and Darren Hayes	3:41
5.	"Riot"	Robert Conley and Darren Hayes	3:35
6.	"On the Radio"	Darren Hayes	3:44
7.	"Tear It Up"	Darren Hayes	3:49
8.	"Never Be the Same Again"	Darren Hayes	5:12
9.	"Watching Me Watching You"	Darren Hayes	5:11
10.	"Fire It Up"	Robert Conley	3:19
11.	"The Pressure"	Robert Conley and Darren Hayes	4:11
Total length:			44:34
