= Let's Try Being in Love =

Single by Darren Hayes

from the album Homosexual
- B-side: "The Look of Love"
- Released: 27 January 2022
- Genre: Pop
- Length: 5:36 (original); 4:00 (edit)
- Label: Powdered Sugar
- Songwriter(s): Darren Hayes
- Producer(s): Darren Hayes

Darren Hayes singles chronology
"I Never Cried So Much in My Whole Life" (2019)	"Let's Try Being in Love" (2022)	"Do You Remember?" (2022)

"Let's Try Being in Love" is a song by Australian singer-songwriter Darren Hayes, released on 27 January 2022 as the lead single from his fifth studio album, Homosexual. It is his first solo single since 2012's "Stupid Mistake".

== Background ==
In 2013, Hayes stopped his music career and tried to build stand-up comedy career. At the same time, he kept creating short singing videos in his social media accounts for his fans. In 2018 Hayes briefly returned on stage with one-off performance of two songs, including "I Knew I Loved You". In 2019, Hayes featured on Cub Sport’s single “I Never Cried So Much in My Whole Life”. He did not appear in the official video. In 2020 he recorded a new version of "Truly Madly Deeply" with slightly modified lyrics. The video of his studio performance was released on YouTube on 24 April.

After his hiatus, Hayes released "Let's Try Being in Love", his first single in a decade. Referred to as a "queer anthem" by NME, in promotional interviews, Hayes explained “I’ve been married to Richard [Cullen] for almost 17 years, [and] I’m in this really comfortable place in my life. But at the same time at mid-life I’m grieving the fact I never got to celebrate who I really was at the period of my life where I was most famous. I look at this world we live in now where someone like Lil Nas X can push forward his true self, full of pride and self-love and have the chance to be loved for who he truly is [...] A lot of the time I was my most famous, I was deeply sad."

On 15 July 2022, the Louis La Roche remix was released.

== Music video ==
A music video for the song was released on 27 January 2022, starring Hayes and featuring actor Scott Evans as his love interest. The video was directed by Andrew Putschoegl. On the video, Hayes commented, "I wanted to show I love the feminine in me, be proud of the gay me. There’s a dance scene that is so passionate, everything’s alive and thriving and blooming. That’s how I feel in general about music. And that’s a hugely sharp contrast to how I felt 10 years ago".

== Critical reception ==
Stephen Daw for Billboard praised the single, stating that Hayes "create[s] the perfect atmosphere for a nostalgic, lovesick pop song", adding "If you’re looking for that added boost of serotonin, look no further."

== Chart performance ==
In the United Kingdom, "Let's Try Being in Love" debuted and peaked at number 96 on the Official UK Singles Download Chart Top 100 and at number 98 on the Official UK Singles Sales Chart Top 100.

== Live performances ==
Hayes performed "Let's Try Being in Love" live for the first time on 5 March 2022 at the 2022 Sydney Gay and Lesbian Mardi Gras Parade, where Hayes headlined. In 2023, Hayes took his Do You Remember? tour to Australia, the United Kingdom and the United States of America, where he performed "Let's Try Being in Love", amongst other tracks from Homosexual, past solo and Savage Garden hits.

== Track listing ==
- Digital single
1. "Let's Try Being in Love" – 5:36
2. "Let's Try Being in Love" (Edit) – 4:00
- 12-inch extended mix digital single
1. "Let's Try Being in Love" (12" Extended) – 9:39
2. "The Look of Love" – 5:37
- Louis La Roche Remix
1. "Let's Try Being in Love" (Louis La Roche Remix) – 4:56

== Charts ==
Chart performance for "Let's Try Being in Love"
Chart (2022)	Peak position
Australian Independent Label (AIR)	9
UK Singles Downloads (OCC)	96
UK Sales (OCC)	98

== Release history ==
Release history and formats for "Let's Try Being in Love"
Country	Date	Format	Label
Various	27 January 2022	Digital download; streaming	Powdered Sugar
