= Popular (Darren Hayes song) =

2004 single by Darren Hayes

"Pop!ular"

Single by Darren Hayes

from the album The Tension and the Spark
- B-side: "Touch"; "Zero"
- Released: 12 July 2004
- Length: 3:52 (album version); 3:44 (radio edit)
- Label: Columbia
- Songwriters: Darren Hayes; Robert Conley
- Producer: Robert Conley

Darren Hayes singles chronology
"I Miss You" (2002)	"Pop!ular" (2004)	"Darkness" (2004)

"Popular" (stylized as "Pop!ular") is a song from Australian singer-songwriter Darren Hayes' second solo album, The Tension and the Spark (2004). The lyrics are a tongue-in-cheek send-up of celebrities and wannabes. A radio edit was made that omits the instrumental section after the second chorus and also adds several new drumbeats to the second verse. The song was released in Australia on 12 July 2004.

Along with "Insatiable", "Pop!ular" is Hayes' highest-charting solo single in Australia, peaking at number three on the ARIA Singles Chart. In the United States, the song reached the top of the Billboard Dance Club Play chart in March 2005, becoming Hayes' first single to top the chart as either a solo artist or with his former group, Savage Garden. A video was later released, showing Darren Hayes and two scantily clad models visiting various landmarks in London. A flash mob dance also takes place in one of the stations in London (Marylebone station).

== Track listings ==
Australia CD1

1. "Pop!ular" (radio edit) – 3:42
2. "Touch" – 4:37
3. "Zero" – 4:52
4. "Pop!ular" (DP Rich Bitch mix) – 4:57

Australia CD2 – The Remixes

1. "Pop!ular" (album version) – 3:53
2. "Pop!ular" (Jason Nevins Global club mix) – 5:53
3. "Pop!ular" (Almighty remix) – 7:37
4. "Pop!ular" (Johnny Budz extended mix) – 5:05
5. "Pop!ular" (Guido Osario club mix) – 8:29

UK CD1

1. "Pop!ular" (album version)
2. "Pop!ular" (Almighty remix radio edit)

UK CD2

1. "Pop!ular" (album version)
2. "Pop!ular" (Wayne G's Heaven Anthem)
3. "Zero"
4. "Pop!ular" (video)

European CD single

1. "Pop!ular" (radio edit)
2. "Touch"

European maxi-CD single

1. "Pop!ular" (radio edit)
2. "Popular"
3. "Touch"
4. "Zero"
5. "Pop!ular" (DP Rich Bitch mix)

== Charts ==
=== Weekly charts ===
Chart (2004–2005)	Peak position
Australia (ARIA)	3
Australian Dance (ARIA)	1
CIS Airplay (TopHit)	5
Romania (Romanian Top 100)	59
Russia Airplay (TopHit)	5
Scotland Singles (OCC)	21
Sweden (Sverigetopplistan)	30
UK Singles (OCC)	12
US Dance Club Play (Billboard) Guido/Wayne G/P. Presta/J. Budz mixes	1

=== Year-end charts ===
Chart (2004)	Position
Australia (ARIA)	83
Australian Dance (ARIA)	9
CIS Airplay (TopHit)	21
Russia Airplay (TopHit)	12

Chart (2005)	Position
US Dance Club Play (Billboard)	50

== Certifications ==
Region	Certification	Certified units/sales
Australia (ARIA)	Gold	35,000^{^}
^{^} Shipments figures based on certification alone.

== Release history ==
Region	Date	Format	Label	Ref.
Australia	12 July 2004	CD	Columbia; Fine Cut	
Denmark	30 August 2004	CD	Columbia	
United Kingdom	30 August 2004	CD	Columbia	

== See also ==
- List of Billboard number-one dance singles of 2005
