= I Miss You (Darren Hayes song) =

Single by Darren Hayes

from the album Spin
- B-side: "Where You Want to Be"
- Released: 4 November 2002
- Recorded: 2001
- Genre: Pop
- Length: 5:30
- Label: Columbia
- Songwriter(s): Darren Hayes, Walter Afanasieff
- Producer(s): Darren Hayes, Greg Bieck

Darren Hayes singles chronology
"Crush (1980 Me)" (2002)	"I Miss You" (2002)	"Popular" (2004)

"I Miss You" is a song by the Australian singer-songwriter Darren Hayes. It was released as the fourth and final single from his first solo album, Spin.

== Background and release ==
The song's protagonist describes how he feels when he is away from the one he loves. The song contains the repetitive phrase "Give me a reason...".

The song debuted at #20 on the UK Singles Chart and at #25 on the Australian ARIA Chart. The music video shows Hayes performing in a diner and flashbacks of him and his lover. At the end, he is reunited with her. In Australia, a music video was also released for the Dallas Austin Mix. This video has the Australian actress Rose Byrne. The UK and European releases of the song included a version of the 1986 Peter Gabriel song "In Your Eyes".

== Track listings ==
- Australia
1. "I Miss You" (Dallas Austin Mix) – 3:28
2. "I Miss You" (radio edit) – 3:31
3. "Crush (1980 Me)" (Crush on Holiday Remix) – 4:24
4. "Where You Want to Be" (original demo recording) – 6:21
- UK CD1
1. "I Miss You" (radio edit) – 3:30
2. "Strange Relationship" (F3 Remix) – 3:50
3. "In Your Eyes" – 4:47
4. "I Miss You" (CD-ROM video)
- UK CD2
1. "I Miss You" (album version) – 5:31
2. "Where You Want to Be" (original demo recording) – 6:12
3. "I Miss You" (instrumental) – 3:31
- UK Cassette
1. "I Miss You" (album version) – 5:31
2. "Where You Want to Be" (original demo recording) – 6:12
- Europe
1. "I Miss You" (radio edit) – 3:30
2. "Strange Relationship" (F3 Remix) – 3:50
3. "In Your Eyes" – 4:47
4. "Insatiable" (acoustic) – 5:20
5. "I Miss You" (CD-ROM video)

== Charts ==
Chart (2002)	Peak position
UK Singles (OCC)	20

Chart (2003)	Peak position
Australia (ARIA)	25
