= Strange Relationship =

2002 single by Darren Hayes

Single by Darren Hayes

from the album Spin
- B-side: "So Bad"
- Released: 27 May 2002
- Studio: Wallyworld (Marin County, California)
- Length: 5:00 (album version); 3:58 (radio edit)
- Label: Roadshow Music; Sony Music; Columbia
- Songwriters: Darren Hayes; Greg Bieck
- Producer: Walter Afanasieff

Darren Hayes singles chronology
"Insatiable" (2002)	"Strange Relationship" (2002)	"Crush (1980 Me)" (2002)

"Strange Relationship" is the second solo single released by Australian singer Darren Hayes from his debut studio album, Spin (2002). The single was released in May 2002 and made it into the top 40 in Australia, Sweden, and the United Kingdom. The music video was directed by Tommy O'Haver; it features Hayes moving around a film set with a number of other people and changing scenery.

== Track listings ==
- Australia CD1
1. "Strange Relationship" (album version)
2. "So Bad" (original demo recording)
3. "Insatiable" (Metro Boys remix)
- Australia CD2 – The Remixes
1. "Strange Relationship" (album version)
2. "Strange Relationship" ('dp versus 'Darren Hayes' mix)
3. "Strange Relationship" (Specificus Mad Scientist mix)
4. "Strange Relationship" (Specificus Jungle Lounge mix)
- UK CD1
1. "Strange Relationship" (radio edit) – 3:58
2. "Sexual Healing" (Capital Radio Session) – 4:00
3. "So Bad" (original demo recording) – 4:09
4. "Strange Relationship" (video)
- UK CD2
1. "Strange Relationship" (album version) – 5:00
2. "Insatiable" (Capital Radio Session) – 5:15
3. "Strange Relationship" (dp versus Darren Hayes mix) – 4:06
- UK cassette single and European CD single
1. "Strange Relationship" (album version) – 5:00
2. "Sexual Healing" (Capital Radio Session) – 4:00

== Credits and personnel ==
Credits are lifted from the Spin album booklet.

Studios

- Recorded and mixed at Wallyworld Studios (Marin County, California)
- Orchestra recorded at Ocean Way Recording (Los Angeles)
- Mastered at Gateway Mastering (Portland, Maine, US)

Personnel

- Darren Hayes – writing, lead and background vocals, co-production
- Greg Bieck – writing, recordings (lead vocals)
- Walter Afanasieff – keyboards, bass, drum and rhythm programming, production, arrangement
- Vernon Black – electric guitars
- Bruce Dukov – violin
- Eve Butler – violin
- Susan Chatman – violin
- Charlie Everett – violin
- Gerry Hilera – violin
- Norm Hughes – violin
- Peter Kent – violin
- Jennifer Munday – violin
- Bob Peterson – violin
- Michele Richards – violin
- Bob Sanov – violin
- Ed Stein – violin
- John Wittenberg – violin
- John Hayhurst – viola
- Karen Elaine – viola
- Virginia Frazier – viola
- Andrew Picken – viola
- Larry Corbett – cello
- Suzie Katayama – cello, orchestral contracting
- Paula Hochhalter – cello
- Dan Smith – cello
- John Mitchell – contra-alto clarinet
- David Campbell – orchestral conducting and arrangement
- David Reitzas – orchestral engineering
- Robert Conley – programming, recording (background vocals), engineering
- Nick Thomas – engineering
- Chris Lord-Alge – mixing
- Bob Ludwig – mastering

== Charts ==
Weekly chart performance for "Strange Relationship"
Chart (2002)	Peak position
Australia (ARIA)	16
Europe (Eurochart Hot 100)	57
New Zealand (Recorded Music NZ)	44
Scotland Singles (OCC)	20
Sweden (Sverigetopplistan)	25
UK Singles (OCC)	15

== Release history ==
Release history and formats for "Strange Relationship"
Region	Date	Format(s)	Label(s)	Ref(s).
Australia	27 May 2002	CD	Roadshow Music; Sony Music	
United Kingdom	8 July 2002	CD; cassette	Columbia	
