= Darkness (Darren Hayes song) =

Single by Darren Hayes

from the album The Tension and the Spark
- B-side: "Random Blinking Light"
- Released: 22 November 2004
- Recorded: 2004
- Genre: Electro; ambient
- Length: 5:17 (album version); 3:58 (radio edit)
- Label: Columbia; Fine Cut
- Songwriters: Darren Hayes; Robert Conley
- Producer: Robert Conley

Darren Hayes singles chronology
"Pop!ular" (2004)	"Darkness" (2004)	"So Beautiful" (2005)

"Darkness" is a song by the Australian singer-songwriter Darren Hayes, taken from his second solo studio album The Tension and the Spark (2004). The track was written by Hayes and Robert Conley, with Conley producing it. It was released on 2 November 2004, as the second and final single from the album. It garnered very little success, peaking at number 40 on the ARIA Singles Chart. Despite a release in the United Kingdom, it did not chart in the country.

== Track listings and formats ==
- Australia CD1
1. "Darkness" (radio edit) – 3:53
2. "Random Blinking Light" – 4:17
3. "Pop!ular" (video)
4. "Darkness" (video)
- Australia CD2 – The Remixes
1. "Darkness" (album version) – 5:17
2. "Darkness" ('dp Behind the Darkness Remix) – 6:00
3. "Darkness" (Roc & Soul Club Mix) – 7:30
4. "Darkness" (Mark Dynamix & Jaytech's Deep Glow Mix) – 8:11
5. "Darkness" (Mark Dynamix & Jaytech's Ambient Glow Mix) – 4:34
- UK CD1
1. "Darkness" (radio edit) – 3:53
2. "Touch" – 4:55
- UK CD2
1. "Darkness" (radio edit) – 3:53
2. "Random Blinking Light" – 4:17
3. "Darkness" ('dp Behind the Darkness Remix) – 6:00
4. "Darkness" (video)

== Charts ==
Chart (2004)	Peak position
Australia (ARIA)	40

== Release history ==
Release dates and formats for "Darkness"
Region	Date	Format(s)	Label(s)	Ref.
United Kingdom	22 November 2004	CD single	Columbia	
Australia	6 December 2004	CD single	Columbia; Fine Cut	
