= Me, Myself and (I) =

Single by Darren Hayes

from the album This Delicate Thing We've Made
- B-side: "Let's Go"; "Slow Down"
- Released: 10 November 2007
- Recorded: 2007
- Genre: Pop, electronica
- Length: 4:05
- Label: Powdered Sugar
- Songwriters: Darren Hayes, Justin Shave
- Producers: Darren Hayes, Justin Shave

Darren Hayes singles chronology
"On the Verge of Something Wonderful" (2007)	"Me, Myself and (I)" (2007)	"Who Would Have Thought" (2007)

"Me, Myself and (I)" is a song written by Australian singer-songwriter Darren Hayes and Justin Shave for Hayes' third solo album, This Delicate Thing We've Made. The song was confirmed as the album's second single on Hayes' official MySpace page in July 2007. According to Hayes' official website, the track was co-written and produced on the second-to-last night of the album recording sessions. The track failed to make the top 40 in the United Kingdom, debuting and peaking at No. 59 on 24 November 2007. The single sleeve artwork bears a striking resemblance to Kraftwerk's The Man-Machine album sleeve, and is most likely an homage to the electronic music pioneers.

== Music video ==
The music video was co-directed by Hayes and his husband Richard Cullen in August 2007 and was shot by Grant Marshall. It was filmed in the University of Queensland's Creative Precinct in Brisbane, Australia on the PANAVISION GENESIS digital film camera, which was created by Sony and Panavision for the filming of Superman Returns. The music video premiered on NeonBird on 25 September 2007, and was released on YouTube the following week. The video features Darren struggling to turn off a cassette player (due to the force from the speakers blasting out the new song) eventually succeeding then collapsing to the floor in exhaustion.

== Track listings ==
UK CD single

1. "Me, Myself and (I)" – 4:05
2. "Let's Go" – 3:45
3. "Slow Down" – 4:29
4. "Me, Myself and (I)" (DJ Wayne G and Andy Allder Electro Mix) – 7:13

UK DVD single

1. "Me, Myself and (I)" (video) – 4:05
2. "Me, Myself and (I)" (Making of the Video) – 4:30

UK 7" vinyl

1. "Me, Myself and (I)" – 4:05
2. "Me, Myself and (I)" (live acoustic version) – 4:07

iTunes digital EP

1. "Me, Myself and (I)" – 4:05
2. "Me, Myself and (I)" (DJ Wayne G and Andy Allder Electro Mix) – 7:07
3. "Me, Myself and (I)" (Andrew Friendly Vocal Mix) – 6:17
4. "Me, Myself and (I)" (7th Heaven Club Mix) – 7:16
5. "Me, Myself and (I)" (7th Heaven Radio Mix) – 3:48
6. "Me, Myself and (I)" (live acoustic version) – 4:07
7. "Me, Myself and (I)" (music video)

Amazon digital EP

1. "Me, Myself and (I)" – 4:05
2. "Me, Myself and (I)" (DJ Wayne G and Andy Allder Electro Mix) – 7:07
3. "Me, Myself and (I)" (Andrew Friendly Vocal Mix) – 6:17
4. "Me, Myself and (I)" (live acoustic version) – 4:07

Darren Hayes' Sandbag Store digital single

1. "Me, Myself and (I)" – 4:05
2. "On the Verge of Something Wonderful" (live acoustic version) – 4:03
3. "Every Little Thing" – 3:33

== Charts ==
Chart (2007)	Peak position
Australian ARIA Physical Singles Chart	48
UK Singles Chart	59
