= I Never Cried So Much in My Whole Life =

Single by Cub Sport featuring Darren Hayes
- Released: 17 October 2019
- Length: 2:59
- Label: Cub Sport
- Songwriter(s): Tim Nelson

Cub Sport singles chronology
| "Limousine" (2019) | "I Never Cried So Much in My Whole Life" (2019) | "Heart in Halves" (2019) |

Darren Hayes singles chronology
| "Stupid Mistake" (2012) | "I Never Cried So Much in My Whole Life" (2019) | "Let's Try Being in Love" (2022) |

"I Never Cried So Much in My Whole Life" is a song by Australian alt-pop group Cub Sport featuring Australian singer-songwriter Darren Hayes, released on 17 October 2019. Songwriter Tim Nelson said "I Never Cried So Much In My Whole Life" is about "happy crying" and being "filled with so much gratitude and happiness and pride for how far we'd come".

The song was released to coincide with Spirit Day, which aims to support and empower LGBTIQ youth to stand up against bullying.

In February 2020, the song was covered by Oh Boy featuring Cub Sport, Cult Shotta, A. GIRL and Isaac Puerile.

== Background ==
Darren Hayes had previously shared that he is a big fan of Cub Sport, and showed up their gig in Los Angeles earlier in 2019. Tim Nelson from Cub Sport has described Hayes as a trailblazer for being open about his sexuality, and has dreamed of working with the singer for many years.

Hayes said "I've been of a fan of Cub Sport since I first heard 'Come On Mess Me Up'… I just loved the songs, Tim's voice, the production". Hayes said he received a text from Tim from Cub Sport asking him if he would be involved with this track. Hayes said "I listened to the song, and literally burst into tears of joy. I responded immediately saying yes. Tim was so generous, he offered me the opportunity to contribute in whatever way I wanted – whether that meant writing my own verse or doing a different take on it. But when I first I heard the song, it was perfect, and I knew all I had to do was sing the song the way it had been written."

Nelson said "Sam and I have both experienced forms of bullying for being queer and I know there were points in my personal journey where I felt like I would never get through that or get to a point where I felt happy and proud and at peace with my identity and sexuality." "I hope it can bring hope and light to anyone who's going through it right now. I've spent so many years of my life feeling like I'd always have to hide, letting the horrible things people would say push me further and further from being my authentic self. I know how it feels to want to be somebody other than yourself but this song is proof that you can make it to the other side."

== Music video ==
An official music video was released on 5 November 2019 and was directed by Ribal Hosn.

== Reception ==
Debbie Carr from ABC said "'I Never Cried So Much In My Life' is Cub Sport at their most raw and vulnerable" calling the song "A breath of fresh air".

== Release history ==
Release history and formats for "I Never Cried So Much in My Whole Life"
| Country | Release date | Format | Label |
|---|---|---|---|
| Various | 17 October 2019 | Digital download; streaming | Cub Sport |
