= Richard Cullen (artist) =

British animator, designer, director, and screenwriter

- Born: 26 July 1970 (age 56); Nottingham, United Kingdom
- Occupations: Animator, music video director, designer, screenwriter
- Years active: 2004–present
- Spouse: Darren Hayes (2006–2024)

Richard Cullen (born 26 July 1970) is a British animator, designer, director, and screenwriter.

== Career ==
Cullen trained as a theatre director at the Rose Bruford College in London, studied film theory at the University of Westminster, and later studied screenwriting at UCLA in California.

He directed and designed productions for a number of London theatres, including Battersea Arts Centre, the Institute of Contemporary Arts, The Orange Tree, Bridewell, Etcetera, and the Young Vic, and worked with literary departments to develop new writing at various venues including Greenwich Theatre, Soho Theatre and Theatre Royal Stratford East. He lectured in Theatre studies at Buckinghamshire Chilterns University in 2005. He has also worked alongside companies such as Improbable theatre, Complicité, Shared Experience, and the late Ken Campbell.

As well as directing music videos, he has created bespoke video content for concert tours, including Darren Hayes' Time Machine and DarkLight Tours, George Michael's 25 Live Tour and Symphonica, Keane's Perfect Symmetry, Red Hot Chili Peppers 2011/2012 world tour, Elton John's 'Million Dollar Piano' residency in Las Vegas.

His work has appeared in festivals (including Hong Kong's Clockenflap), Ralph Larmann's 'Stage Design' (published by daab, and featuring his work for George Michael), and in magazines such as Digital Arts and Total Production.

In 2009, he directed and animated his husband Darren Hayes' DVD This Delicate Film We've Made, which entered the UK music DVD charts at #1.

Through his own studio 'Pixelfing', he often produces work for onedotzero in London, and Duck Studios in Los Angeles.

After relocating to Los Angeles, Cullen has won several awards for screenwriting.

== Selected work ==
- 2006: "Mango Tree", Angus & Julia Stone
- 2007: "Who Would Have Thought" by Darren Hayes
- 2007: "Me, Myself and I" by Darren Hayes
- 2009: "The Sunshine Song" by The Candle Thieves

== Personal life ==
Cullen was married to Darren Hayes, previously of Savage Garden. They married privately in July 2005 and entered into a civil partnership in London in June 2006. Hayes announced the event two days prior on his official website; Cullen's name had previously appeared there as the designer of the cover for Hayes' single "So Beautiful", which Hayes actually wrote for Cullen. The couple were married in 2013 in California as a gesture of support for same-sex marriage rights. In 2023, Hayes and Cullen announced their separation.

== Awards and nominations ==
- In 2008, he was nominated for a BIMA award for his work on the video for Darren Hayes' "Who Would Have Thought"
- In 2009, he was nominated for the UK Music Video Awards for his mixed media video for The Candle Thieves' "The Sunshine Song".
- In 2009, he was nominated for the UK Music Video Awards for his video for The Candle Thieves' "We're All Gonna Die".
