= So Beautiful =

2005 single by Darren Hayes

Single by Darren Hayes

from the album Truly Madly Completely: The Best of Savage Garden
- B-side: "Something in the Sky"
- Released: 31 October 2005
- Studio: London, England
- Length: 4:58 (album version); 3:58 (Australia radio edit); 4:13 (UK radio edit)
- Label: Roadshow, Sony BMG
- Songwriter(s): Darren Hayes, Robert Conley
- Producer(s): Darren Hayes, Robert Conley

Darren Hayes singles chronology
| "Darkness" (2004) | "So Beautiful" (2005) | "Step into the Light" (2007) |

"So Beautiful" is a song written by Australian singer-songwriter Darren Hayes and Robert Conley. In 2005, the song was released as a single as a part of the promotion of the greatest hits album Truly Madly Completely: The Best of Savage Garden, a band that Hayes was part of until their split in 2001. Hayes was credited on the release as "Darren Hayes (of Savage Garden)".

== Background ==
The song was written for Hayes's boyfriend Richard Cullen, whom he married in a civil partnership ceremony in London on 19 June 2006. The song peaked at number 27 on the US Adult Contemporary chart. It reached number 8 in Darren Hayes' native Australia. The single itself features a different version of the song that did not feature on the album, produced by Robert Conley. This version resembles Hayes's solo work more than the album version does, which sounds more like Savage Garden's work. The single version of the song contains a different introduction and a slightly faster tempo. The album version also appears in edited form on the UK maxi single as "Spike's Radio Edit" and is the version used for the video. It was produced by Mark "Spike" Stent.

== Track listings ==
- Australia
1. "So Beautiful" (original radio edit) – 4:13
2. "To the Moon and Back" (live medley) – 7:18
3. "Truly Madly Deeply" (live medley) – 6:15
4. "Something in the Sky" – 4:44
5. "So Beautiful" (Lee Groves Mix) – 4:03
- UK CD1
1. "So Beautiful" (radio edit) – 4:13
2. "To the Moon and Back" (live medley) – 5:44
- UK CD2
1. "So Beautiful" (Spike's 'Stent' Mix) – 3:58
2. "Something in the Sky" – 4:44
3. "Truly Madly Deeply" (live medley) – 6:15
4. "So Beautiful" (Lee Groves Mix) – 4:03
5. "So Beautiful" (CD-ROM video)
- UK promotional single
1. "So Beautiful" (Bobby Blanco & Miki Moto Radio Edit) – 3:57
2. "So Beautiful" (Bobby Blanco & Miki Moto Club Remix) – 7:12
3. "Savage Garden Megamix" – 9:46

== Charts ==
Chart performance for "So Beautiful"
| Chart (2005) | Peak position |
|---|---|
| Australia (ARIA) | 7 |
| Greece (IFPI) | 25 |
| Sweden (Sverigetopplistan) | 55 |
| UK Singles (OCC) | 15 |
