= Spin (Darren Hayes album) =

Studio album by Darren Hayes
- Released: 18 March 2002
- Recorded: 8 November 2001
- Genres: R&B; soft rock
- Length: 62:11
- Label: Columbia
- Producers: Walter Afanasieff (tracks 2, 3, 6, 8 and 12), Greg Bieck (tracks 1 and 4), Rick Nowels (track 5, 9, 10 and 11), Robert Conley (track 7)

Darren Hayes chronology
Spin (2002)	The Tension and the Spark (2004)

Singles from Spin
- 1. "Insatiable" Released: 10 December 2001; 2. "Strange Relationship" Released: 27 May 2002; 3. "Crush (1980 Me)" Released: 19 August 2002; 4. "I Miss You" Released: 4 November 2002

Professional ratings
Review scores
Source	Rating
AllMusic	2.5/5 stars
The Tribune	2/5 stars

Spin is the first solo album released by former Savage Garden vocalist Darren Hayes. The album was partially produced by Walter Afanasieff and mixed by Chris Lord-Alge. It was released in Australia in March 2002.

== Background ==
Walter Afanasieff, who had already worked on Savage Garden's Affirmation, oversaw the production of the majority of the album, with help from co-producers Greg Bieck, Rick Nowels and Robert Conley. Afanasieff produced five of the twelve tracks on the original release: "Insatiable", "Heart Attack", "Dirty", "Good Enough" and the title track, "Spin"; Bieck produced "Strange Relationship" and "I Miss You"; Nowels produced "Creepin' Up on You", "I Can't Ever Get Enough of You", "Like It or Not" and "What You Like"; and Conley solely produced the track "Crush (1980 Me)". Afanasieff also produced the Australian-release bonus track, "The Heart Wants What It Wants", and the UK collector's edition bonus tracks, "I Wish U Heaven" and "Can't Help Falling in Love". As of 2006, the album sold 118,000 units in the United States.

== Singles ==
"Insatiable" was the album's lead single in December 2001, becoming a hit in several places across the globe. The single came backed with new B-sides "Falling at Your Feet" and "Ride", plus mixes of the track from Calderone, Pablo La Rosa, Specificus, DP and the Metro Boys.

"Strange Relationship" was released as the album's second single in May 2002. The single came backed with the new B-side "So Bad", remixes by DP and Specificus, the Metro Boys remix and Capital Radio Session of "Insatiable". It included a cover of the Marvin Gaye song "Sexual Healing", Hayes' second cover of a song by the artist, having participated in the 2001 Artists Against AIDS Worldwide recording of the song.

"Crush (1980 Me)" was released as the album's third single in August 2002 in Australia. The single includes the new B-side "Right Dead Back on It", remixes by Mayday Biscuit Disco and "Crush on Holiday"; a mash-up with Madonna's 1983 single "Holiday".

"I Miss You" was released in the United Kingdom in November 2002 and in Australia in February 2003. The single includes the new B-sides "In Your Eyes" (a cover of the Peter Gabriel track featured on the UK and European versions) and "Where You Want to Be", plus a remix by Dallas Austin.

== Track listing ==
Spin track listing
No.	Title	Writer(s)	Producer	Length
1.	"Strange Relationship"	Darren Hayes; Greg Bieck	Greg Bieck	5:02
2.	"Insatiable"	Hayes; Walter Afanasieff	Walter Afanasieff	5:10
3.	"Heart Attack"	Hayes; Afanasieff	Afanasieff	5:04
4.	"I Miss You"	Hayes; Bieck	Bieck	5:30
5.	"Creepin' Up on You"	Hayes; Rick Nowels	Rick Nowels	4:53
6.	"Dirty"	Hayes; Afanasieff	Afanasieff	4:45
7.	"Crush (1980 Me)"	Hayes; Robert Conley	Robert Conley	4:00
8.	"Good Enough"	Hayes; Afanasieff	Afanasieff	6:11
9.	"I Can't Ever Get Enough of You"	Hayes; Nowels	Nowels	5:16
10.	"Like It or Not"	Hayes; Nowels	Nowels	6:20
11.	"What You Like"	Hayes; Nowels	Nowels	5:38
12.	"Spin"	Hayes; Afanasieff	Afanasieff	4:22

UK debut edition enhanced content
No.	Title	Writer(s)	Producer(s)	Length
13.	"Where You Want to Be" (original demo recording)	Hayes; Nowels	Nowels	6:24
14.	"When You Say You Love Me"	Hayes	Hayes	4:37
15.	"Lift Me Up"	Hayes; Nowels	Charles Fisher; Nowels	3:59

Australia and Japan bonus track
No.	Title	Writer(s)	Producer	Length
13.	"The Heart Wants What It Wants"	Hayes; Afanasieff	Afanasieff	4:57

Asia bonus track
No.	Title	Writer(s)	Producer	Length
13.	"Insatiable" (Pablo Club Mix)	Hayes; Afanasieff	Afanasieff	7:23

Australian tour edition bonus disc and Japanese "Too Close for Comfort" Tour EP
No.	Title	Writer(s)	Producer	Length
1.	"Dirty" (live from Taipei)	Hayes; Afanasieff	Afanasieff	3:59
2.	"Insatiable" (live from Taipei)	Hayes; Afanasieff	Afanasieff	5:22
3.	"Strange Relationship" (live from Taipei)	Hayes; Bieck	Bieck	3:47
4.	"I Miss You" (live from Taipei)	Hayes; Bieck	Bieck	4:48
5.	"Good Enough" (live from Taipei)	Hayes; Afanasieff	Afanasieff	7:15

UK collector's edition bonus disc
No.	Title	Writer(s)	Producer	Length
1.	"I Wish U Heaven"	Prince	Afanasieff	2:12
2.	"Can't Help Falling in Love"	Hugo Peretti; Luigi Creatore; George David Weiss	Afanasieff	2:16
3.	"Dirty" (live from Taipei)	Hayes; Afanasieff	Afanasieff	3:59
4.	"Insatiable" (live from Taipei)	Hayes; Afanasieff	Afanasieff	5:22
5.	"Strange Relationship" (live from Taipei)	Hayes; Bieck	Bieck	3:47
6.	"I Miss You" (live from Taipei)	Hayes; Bieck	Bieck	4:48
7.	"Good Enough" (live from Taipei)	Hayes; Afanasieff	Afanasieff	7:15

Asian bonus enhanced content
No.	Title	Length
8.	"I Miss You" (video)	3:40

== Charts ==
=== Weekly charts ===
Weekly chart performance for Spin
Chart (2002)	Peak position
Australian Albums (ARIA)	3
Danish Albums (Hitlisten)	8
Finnish Albums (Suomen virallinen lista)	10
German Albums (Offizielle Top 100)	47
Irish Albums (IRMA)	47
New Zealand Albums (RMNZ)	22
Swedish Albums (Sverigetopplistan)	7
Swiss Albums (Schweizer Hitparade)	30
UK Albums (Official Charts)	2
US Billboard 200	35

=== Year-end charts ===
Year-end chart performance for Spin
Chart (2002)	Position
Australian Albums (ARIA)	54
Swedish Albums (Sverigetopplistan)	60
UK Albums (OCC)	46

== Certifications and sales ==
Certifications and sales for Spin
Region	Certification	Certified units/sales
Australia (ARIA)	Platinum	70,000^{^}
Sweden (GLF)	Gold	30,000^{^}
United Kingdom (BPI)	Platinum	300,000^{^}
United States	—	118,000
^{^} Shipments figures based on certification alone.
