= On the Verge of Something Wonderful =

Single by Darren Hayes

from the album This Delicate Thing We've Made
- B-side: "Fallen Angel"; "God Is in the Room"; "Ocean"
- Released: 28 July 2007
- Recorded: Phoenix, United States
- Genre: Pop, electropop, synthpop
- Length: 4:02
- Label: Powdered Sugar
- Songwriters: Darren Hayes, Robert Conley
- Producers: Darren Hayes, Robert Conley

Darren Hayes singles chronology
"Step into the Light" (2007)	"On the Verge of Something Wonderful" (2007)	"Me, Myself and (I)" (2007)

"On the Verge of Something Wonderful" is a song written by Australian singer-songwriter Darren Hayes and Robert Conley for Hayes' third solo album, This Delicate Thing We've Made. The song is the first single to be released from the album, made available in Australia on 28 July 2007 and in the UK on 6 August 2007. It debuted at number 20 in the UK Singles Chart, before dropping 53 places to 73.

== Music video ==
The music video contains a cameo appearance by Janice Dickinson, former model and former judge on America's Next Top Model. According to Hayes himself, having Dickinson appear in the music video was not planned at all. The day before the video shoot, Hayes had briefly met Dickinson through a friend and – after being struck by how much grace and star quality Dickinson carried with her up close – Hayes jokingly said that she could play the part of the evil, sexy shopaholic in the video. To everyone's surprise, Dickinson accepted the offer. The video features Darren singing in front of many animated backdrops, and is reminiscent of the Max Headroom series, some scenes of the film Electric Dreams and the aesthetics of some Atari brochures of the early 80s.

== Track listings ==
UK CD1

1. "On the Verge of Something Wonderful" – 4:02
2. "Fallen Angel" – 4:55

UK CD2

1. "On the Verge of Something Wonderful" – 4:02
2. "Step into the Light" (Hook and Sling Mix) – 8:19
3. "Step into the Light" (Shave and Sugar Mix) – 7:28
4. "I Just Want You to Love Me" (live from the Sydney Opera House) – 4:11

UK DVD

1. "On the Verge of Something Wonderful" (video) – 4:03
2. "I Just Want You to Love Me" (live from the Sydney Opera House video) – 4:11

Australia

1. "On the Verge of Something Wonderful" – 4:02
2. "Step into the Light" (Hook and Sling Mix) – 8:19
3. "Step into the Light" (Shave and Sugar Mix) – 7:28
4. "I Just Want You to Love Me" (live from the Sydney Opera House) – 4:11

iTunes digital single

1. "On the Verge of Something Wonderful" – 4:02
2. "On the Verge of Something Wonderful" (Wayne G Totally '80s Remix) – 8:28
3. "On the Verge of Something Wonderful" (music video)

iTunes digital EP

1. "On the Verge of Something Wonderful" – 4:02
2. "Step into the Light" (Hook and Sling Mix) – 8:19
3. "Step into the Light" (Shave and Sugar Mix) – 7:28
4. "I Just Want You to Love Me" (live from the Sydney Opera House) – 4:11
5. "On the Verge of Something Wonderful" (Wayne G Totally '80s Remix) – 8:28
6. "Love is in Everything" (pre-order bonus track) – 4:14

Amazon digital single

1. "On the Verge of Something Wonderful" – 4:02
2. "On the Verge of Something Wonderful" (Shave – the 12" Extended Mix) – 6:29

Darren Hayes Sandbag Store digital single

1. "On the Verge of Something Wonderful" – 4:02
2. "God is in the Room" – 5:13
3. "Ocean" – 4:19

== Charts ==
Chart (2007)	Peak position
UK Singles Chart	20
Australian ARIA Singles Chart	29
ARIA Physical Sales Chart	22
ARIA Australasian Chart	9
