= This Delicate Thing We've Made =

Studio album by Darren Hayes
- Released: 20 August 2007
- Recorded: 2006–2007
- Genre: Pop, electronic
- Length: 61:06 (Side 1); 51:20 (Side 2); 112:26 (Total)
- Label: Powdered Sugar
- Producer: Justin Shave, Robert Conley

Darren Hayes chronology
The Tension and the Spark (2004)	This Delicate Thing We've Made (2007)	We Are Smug (2009)

Alternative cover
- Limited edition album cover

Singles from This Delicate Thing We've Made
- 1. "Step into the Light" Released: 9 April 2007; 2. "On the Verge of Something Wonderful" Released: 28 July 2007; 3. "Me, Myself and (I)" Released: 10 November 2007; 4. "Who Would Have Thought" Released: 10 November 2007; 5. "Casey" Released: 3 March 2008

Professional ratings
Aggregate scores
Source	Rating
Metacritic	61/100
Review scores
Source	Rating
Billboard	2007
The Guardian	2007
Stylus Magazine	B− 2007
Sputnikmusic	2007

This Delicate Thing We've Made is the third studio album by Australian singer-songwriter Darren Hayes. It is a double album released on his label Powdered Sugar on 20 August 2007. The first single from the album, "On the Verge of Something Wonderful", was released in Australia on 28 July 2007 and in the UK and online on 6 August 2007.

== Background ==
After leaving Sony, Hayes created his own Powdered Sugar record label for the release of This Delicate Thing We’ve Made. "At first I was terrified, because I presumed I was going to get a deal for this record and sell it on. But as the conceptual time-travel idea started to emerge I was definitely aware that the path I was taking was making it harder and harder to take to a new label. I did meet with Angel — a tiny offshoot pop label of EMI — who we brought in on the latter half of the recording process. They got really excited but I shut down the process when they started saying "We really love it but can we have copies to give to our executives to see if they can live with it?" I thought, "I've passed that point. I'm making this record the way I want, I've hired the mix engineer and the people I want, the song sequence has been on a white board for several months and I have the front cover".

The album has been made with the help of a 1982 Fairlight CMI synthesizer, and the ex-Savage Garden frontman has said it is a cinematic and theatrical album. It reached number 5 on the Top Albums chart of the Australian iTunes Store on the day of release and number 3 later in its first week. Hayes later said of the album in a 2011 interview that "it was my rebellious streak. It was a strange 25-song double album with only one or two songs that could be played on the radio. It was a bit sobering."

Hayes released a companion DVD, This Delicate Film We've Made, containing music videos for fifteen of the songs on the album, with the audio remastered in 5.1 surround sound. A number of the videos were animations in which Hayes did not appear.

== Singles ==
"On the Verge of Something Wonderful" was released as the album's first official single on 1 July 2007, with the music video premiering on 9 July. A short clip of the song had previously been revealed in an album teaser on Hayes' official website. On 4 August 2007, "Me, Myself and (I)" was revealed as the album's second single. The music video was released on 25 September 2007. A short clip of the song had previously been revealed in an album teaser on Hayes' official website. "Casey" became the album's third and final single in March 2008, and was backed by a plethora of B-sides and remixes on various digital bundles, none of which featured the original version of the song. The partly animated music video was released in December 2007.

"Step into the Light" was first revealed via an album teaser on Hayes' official website and MySpace profile. On 14 May 2007, Hayes released an animated video for the song, and in June 2007, a promotional remix EP was released to clubs in the United States in promotion of the album. The single was only issued promotionally. "Who Would Have Thought" was released as a promotional single alongside the release of "Me, Myself and (I)". The song was accompanied by an animated video, which was premiered as a teaser on his official website, as well as his Myspace profile, on 9 April 2007. The track was co-written with Guy Chambers.

== Track listing ==
Disc one
No.	Title	Writer(s)	Producer(s)	Length
1.	"A Fear of Falling Under"	Hayes, Justin Shave	Justin Shave	4:09
2.	"Who Would Have Thought"	Hayes, Guy Chambers	Guy Chambers	4:30
3.	"Waking the Monster"	Hayes, Robert Conley	Robert Conley	4:07
4.	"How to Build a Time Machine"	Hayes, Robert Conley	Robert Conley	5:51
5.	"Casey"	Hayes, Peter-John Vettese	Peter-John Vettese	6:26
6.	"Step into the Light"	Hayes, Robert Conley	Robert Conley	4:57
7.	"Sing to Me"	Hayes, Matthew Wilder	Matthew Wilder	4:56
8.	"A Conversation With God"	Hayes, Robert Conley	Robert Conley	5:08
9.	"The Sun Is Always Blinding Me"	Hayes, Eg White	Eg White	4:24
10.	"Listen All You People"	Hayes, Robert Conley	Robert Conley	5:00
11.	"The Only One"	Hayes, George Muranyi	George Muranyi	3:42
12.	"Bombs Up in My Face"	Hayes, Justin Shave	Justin Shave	3:39
13.	"The Great Big Disconnect"	Hayes, Robert Conley	Robert Conley	4:17

Disc two
No.	Title	Writer(s)	Producer(s)	Length
14.	"The Future Holds a Lion's Heart"	Hayes, Robert Conley	Robert Conley	4:03
15.	"On the Verge of Something Wonderful"	Hayes, Robert Conley	Robert Conley	4:02
16.	"Neverland"	Hayes, Justin Shave	Justin Shave	4:04
17.	"Walk Away"	Hayes, George Muranyi	George Muranyi	4:46
18.	"Maybe"	Hayes, Robert Conley	Robert Conley	4:16
19.	"Me, Myself and (I)"	Hayes, Robert Conley	Robert Conley	4:05
20.	"Lucky Town"	Hayes, Robert Conley	Robert Conley	3:50
21.	"I Just Want You to Love Me"	Hayes	Robert Conley	4:00
22.	"Setting Sun"	Hayes, Justin Shave	Justin Shave	4:12
23.	"A Hundred Challenging Things a Boy Can Do"	Hayes, Robert Conley	Robert Conley	5:01
24.	"Words"	Hayes, Stuart Brawley	Stuart Brawley	4:34
25.	"The Tuning of Violins"	Hayes, Justin Shave	Justin Shave	4:30

iTunes Store deluxe edition bonus material
No.	Title	Writer(s)	Producer(s)	Length
26.	"Love Is in Everything"	Hayes, Robert Conley	Robert Conley	4:14
27.	"EPK 2007 – This Delicate Film We've Made" (video)			2:56
28.	"On the Verge of Something Wonderful" (music video)			4:03

Outtakes, B-sides and demos
No.	Title	Availability	Length
1.	"Love Is in Everything"	As a bonus track via the pre-order of the iTunes EP for the single "On the Verge of Something Wonderful", and as a bonus track on the iTunes version of the album
2.	"Fallen Angel"	B-side to the physical single of "On the Verge of Something Wonderful"
3.	"God Is in the Room"	B-side to the digital single of "On the Verge of Something Wonderful"
4.	"Ocean"	B-side to the digital single of "On the Verge of Something Wonderful"
5.	"Let's Go" (Demo)	B-side to the physical single of "Me, Myself and (I)", an out-take from The Tension and the Spark
6.	"Slow Down"	B-side to the physical single of "Me, Myself and (I)", an out-take from the album
7.	"Every Little Thing" (Demo)	B-side to the digital single of "Me, Myself and (I)"
8.	"Breathless"	B-side to the digital single of "Who Would Have Thought"
9.	"The Only One" (Demo)	B-side to the digital single of "Who Would Have Thought", significantly different from the album version
10.	"Words" (Demo)	B-side to the digital single of "Casey"
11.	"Casey" (Demo)	B-side to the digital single of "Casey", significantly different from the album version
12.	"Walk Away" (Demo)	B-side to the digital single of "Casey"
13.	"In Your Mother's Eyes" (Demo)	B-side to the digital single of "Casey"
14.	"Mystery"	Unreleased track, has not appeared in any form
15.	"I've Been There"	Unreleased track that leaked onto the internet in 2008
16.	"The Wrong Way" (Demo)	Unreleased track that Hayes added to his MySpace page for a short period
17.	"Song for the Disenfranchised"	A track which appeared on the demo track listing for the album, but not included on the final version
18.	"Glad to See You Back Again"	A track which appeared on the demo track listing for the album, but not included on the final version
19.	"Fairlight"	A track which appeared on the demo track listing for the album, but not included on the final version
20.	"Anyone's Guess"	A track which appeared on the demo track listing for the album, but not included on the final version

== This Delicate Film We've Made DVD ==
1. A Fear of Falling Under
2. Who Would Have Thought
3. Waking the Monster
4. How to Build a Time Machine
5. Neverland
6. Step into the Light
7. Casey
8. Setting Sun
9. Words
10. A Hundred Challenging Things a Boy Can Do
11. Maybe
12. A Conversation With God
13. Bonus Music Videos
14. On the Verge of Something Wonderful
15. Me, Myself and (I)

== Charts ==
This Delicate Thing We've Made spent just two weeks in the Australian top 50 and the UK top 75: it entered the Australian Albums Top 50 at No. 19 before falling to No. 38 the following week, and entered the UK Albums Chart at No. 14 before falling to No. 72 the following week.

Chart (2007)	Peak position
Australian Albums (ARIA)	19
UK Albums (OCC)	14
US Billboard Top Independent Albums	44
