= Louis La Roche =

Musician, producer, and remixer

- Also known as: Louis La Roche
- Born: Brett Ewels; 15 September 1990 (age 36)
- Origin: Norwich, England
- Genres: Nu-disco, french house, funk
- Occupations: Songwriter, producer, remixer, DJ
- Years active: 2008–present
- Labels: Ever After Records, Spinnin' Records, Om Records, Nurvous Records, Animal Language
- Website: louislaroche.com

Brett Ewels (born 15 September 1990), best known by his stage name Louis La Roche, is a house/nu-disco producer, remixer and DJ from Norwich, England.

== Career ==
=== 2008–2015: Early career ===
La Roche began his career in 2008 with the Michael Jackson-sampled debut track "Love" (which was originally mistaken for Daft Punk) and featured on an unofficial five-track EP entitled "The Peach EP" (2008). The track quickly made an impact across online blogs and led to recognition via an article by British newspaper The Guardian. From there, Louis went on to form his own record label "Ever After Records", on which he released the EP's "Me & Her" (2009), "Super Soaker" (2010) and "Number One" (2011), a collaboration with German producer Patrick Alavi. He followed this with the single "My Turn", which featured guest vocals by Yann Destal of Modjo.

In 2013, La Roche released the five-track EP "Composure" on Ever After Records, shortly followed by the double A-side single "Kaboom/Funk Trunk Skunk" on Om Records. In 2014, he released the single "Offline" featuring J Paul Getto & Lizzie Curious on Nurvous Records. This was then followed up with a late 1980s inspired EP entitled "Dusty Cassette" on Ever After Records.

In 2014, La Roche supported Kylie Minogue on two dates of her Kiss Me Once Tour. In 2015, he undertook North and South American tours.

On 1 June 2015, he released the single "Just Like You" on Ever After Records, which was featured on Majestic Casual. This was followed by the release of Louis' debut album, To Rest Is To Rust, on 6 July 2015. In February 2016, It was announced La Roche would be releasing two concept EPs entitled "1986" and "1996".

On July 28, 2015, La Roche presented his own hour long show on BBC Radio 1.

=== 2017–present: Continued success ===
On March 20, 2017, La Roche released his second album, Sleepless Nights.

La Roche released a surprise single "Lovers" on 25 May 2018, a collaboration with Scottish DJ/producer Mylo (his first new material in 14 years).

On 24 January 2020, La Roche announced his upcoming album Saturday Night Griever, following the release of the two singles "Better" featuring Lucy Pearson and "Desire" featuring Frankmusik. Saturday Night Griever was released on 27 March 2020.

On 29 October 2021, Louis released his 4th studio album, We're Not So Different, featuring the song "Cold To Me", a collaboration with Darren Hayes.

In 2022, Louis released the singles ‘Some Way’, ‘Gone’, followed in 2023 with ‘Colours’. Louis announced his upcoming fifth studio ‘Admittedly’ will be released in 2023.

On March 28, 2023, Louis supported Darren Hayes at the London Palladium on his ‘Do You Remember’ UK Tour.

On October 18 2024, Louis released "ANGLIA SQUARE", his 6th studio album. Inspired by the Norwich shopping area Anglia Square and Sovereign House.

On March 13th 2026, Louis announced his upcoming 7th studio album 'The New Now' will be released July 31st 2026.

== Remixes and soundtracks ==
In addition to his own material, La Roche has created a string of official remixes for artists such as Fatboy Slim, Basement Jaxx, Darren Hayes, Fred Falke, Spiller, Aeroplane, Mike Mago, Don Diablo, VV Brown, Del Marquis (of the Scissor Sisters), Teenage Bad Girl, Mercury Music Prize winner Speech Debelle and The Supermen Lovers. Unofficial remixes include the likes of Michael Jackson, Calvin Harris, Miley Cyrus, George Michael, Burial, Kate Bush and Gorillaz.

In addition to radio, La Roche has also written music for television, being featured in the Channel 4 series Skins as well as composing the theme song for Canada's MuchMusic Video Awards. La Roche was featured as The Guardian Music's first 'New Band of The Day' for 2010. He was featured in the UK music magazine Future Music (published on 9 May 2012) and recorded a video interview in the MofoHifi studio in London, where he discusses working with FL Studio, producing techniques and his creative process. La Roche was promoted to an FL Studio Power User in late 2013.

== Discography ==
Albums

- The New Now (Ever After Records, 2026)
- ANGLIA SQUARE (Ever After Records, 2024)
- Admittedly (Ever After Records, 2023)
- We’re Not So Different (Ever After Records, 2021)
- Saturday Night Griever (Ever After Records, 2020)
- Sleepless Nights (Ever After Records, 2017)
- To Rest Is To Rust (Ever After Records, 2015)

EP's

- "1996" (Ever After Records, 2016)
- "1986" (Ever After Records, 2016)
- "Lend Me A Lug" (Animal Language, 2015)
- "Don't Hold Back" (Ever After Records, 2015)
- "Dusty Cassette" (Ever After Records, 2014)
- "Composure" (Ever After Records, 2013)
- "Number One" with Patrick Alavi (RoXour, 2011)
- "Supersoaker" (Ever After Records, 2010)
- "Me & Her" (Ever After Records, 2009)
- "The Peach EP" (Unofficial, 2008)

Singles

- "Alright" Feat. The High Points (Ever After Records, 2026)
- "1989 (Get Together)" (Ever After Records, 2026)
- "Chasing Moments" Feat. HEDDIE (Ever After Records, 2026)
- "Hot Gossip" (Ever After Records, 2026)
- "No One Really Cares" (Ever After Records, 2026)
- "I Found You" (Ever After Records, 2026)
- "LAY DOWN YOUR LOVE" (Ever After Records, 2024)
- "PALOMA" (Ever After Records, 2024)
- "SO MUCH" (Ever After Records, 2024)
- "LDN CRW" (Ever After Records, 2024)
- "The Broken One" Feat. Ashley Alisha (Ever After Records, 2023)
- "Colours" (Ever After Records, 2023)
- "Gone" (Ever After Records, 2022)
- "Some Way" (Ever After Records, 2022)
- "One Big Gay Disco" (Ever After Records, 2021)
- "I Wish I Didn't Love You" (Ever After Records, 2021)
- "Crazy" (Ever After Records, 2021)
- "Thank Ya" (Ever After Records, 2020)
- "Desire" Feat. Frankmusik (Ever After Records, 2020)
- "Better" Feat. Lucy Pearson (Ever After Records, 2019)
- "Lovers" Feat. Mylo (Ever After Records, 2018)
- "Atheist Anthem" (Ever After Records, 2017)
- "All I Had" (Ever After Records, 2016)
- "Just Like You" (Ever After Records, 2015)
- "The Receiver" (Spinnin' Records, 2015)
- "Offline" – Feat. J Paul Getto & Lizzie Curious (Nurvous Records, 2014)
- "Kaboom / Funk Trunk Skunk" (OM Records, 2013)
- "Untrue / Touch Wood" (Ever After Records, 2012)
- "Gimme Gimme / The Wall" (Ever After Records, 2011)
- "My Turn" – Feat. Yann Destal (Ever After Records, 2011)

Official remixes

- Dance Yourself Clean - Peach Pit (Lights & Music Collective, 2024)
- corook - CGI (Atlantic Records, 2023)
- METTE - Mama's Eyes (Sony Music, 2023)
- Darren Hayes - Do You Remember? (Powdered Sugar, 2022)
- Darren Hayes - Let's Try Being in Love (Powdered Sugar, 2022)
- Crooked Colours - No Sleep (Atlantic/Sweat It Out, 2021)
- Fatboy Slim - Retox (Loaded/BMG/Skint, 2020)
- Tragic Sasha - Shh (Amuse, 2020)
- Lili Caseley - C'est La Vie (Spinnup, 2020)
- Jean Tonique - Open Market (Toucan Sounds, 2020)
- BAYNK - go with u (AllPoints, 2019)
- Nicolaas - No Stranger Thing (Haven Sounds, 2019)
- The Tribe Of Good - Turning It Up For The Sunshine (Ultra, 2018)
- Cadre Cola - Our Love (2018)
- Karma Fields - You & Me (2018)
- Maya Law - Full Circle (2018)
- Wide Eyed Boy - Loving You Is So Easy (Polygonia, 2017)
- Fyütch & Boba Sweat - Taboo (2017)
- Loop - As If (M:UK, 2017)
- Invader Girl - Casio (Electronic Rumours, 2016)
- Modern Machines feat. 8 Graves - Breathe (2016)
- Superwalkers - Lost (As I Am) (Cosmos, 2016)
- GIRL FRIEND - Tragic On The Dancefloor (2016)
- Mat Zo – Feat. I See Monstas - Sinful (Mad Zoo, 2016)
- Public Service Broadcasting - Go! (Test Card Recordings, 2015)
- Slow Knights - Candy Sugar Rush (Self Raising, 2015)
- Montmartre - Out of Violence (MM Music Prod, 2015)
- Luke Million - Light & Sound (Etcetc, 2014)
- Max Frost - White Lies (Atlantic Records, 2014)
- The Young Punx - Supersonic (MofoHifi, 2014)
- Birdee - The Way It Is (Nurvous, 2014)
- Irish Steph - Breathe (La Valigetta, 2014)
- Crystal Bats - Falling in Love (2014)
- Mike Mago - The Show (Ministry of Sound, 2013)
- Lemaitre - Splitting Colors (Substellar, 2013)
- The Supermen Lovers - Moments (Lafesse Records, 2013)
- Ruckus Roboticus - The Phantoms Theme (Dance or Die Records, 2013)
- Marius - Come With Me (Non Records, 2012)
- Speech Debelle - I'm With It (Big Dada Recordings, 2012)
- Aeroplane Feat. Jamie Principle - In Her Eyes (Aeropop, 2012)
- The Noisettes - Winner (Universal, 2012)
- Combostar - Free (La Valigetta, 2012)
- Speakers - And Her Too (Virgin Records, 2012)
- The Knocks & Fred Falke - Geronimo (Kitsune, 2012)
- Roborton (Rob Da Bank & Tom Middleton) – Feat. Au Revoir Simone - Paganini Rocks (Sunday Best Recordings, 2011)
- Teenage Bad Girl - Keep Up With You (Citizen Records, 2011)
- Matt Samuels - Love Begins (Toolroom Records, 2011)
- Spiller - Pigeonman's Revenge (Nano, 2011)
- Geyster - A Change for the Better (17:44 Records, 2011)
- Pierre De La Touché - Song of The Sirens (GrooveTraxx, 2011)
- SomethingALaMode - Show Me (SoundALaMode, 2011)
- The Swiss - Double or Nothing (Modular, 2011)
- Blende - One Sided (La Bombe, 2011)
- Phonat - Set Me Free (MofoHifi, 2010)
- Ocelot - Beating Hearts (Wall of Sound, 2010)
- Stretch & Vern - I'm Alive (Ministry of Sound, 2010)
- Human Life - In It Together (Lifex, 2010)
- Jean Jacques Smoothie - 2 People (Bargrooves, 2010)
- Bright Light, Bright Light - Love Part II (Aztec Records, 2010)
- Shena - Nasty Little Rumour (Hed Kandi, 2010)
- Burns & Fred Falke - You Stopped Loving Me (Destruction Records, 2010)
- Jam Xpress - Gotcha Feeling (Onelove, 2010)
- VV Brown - Shark in the Water (Universal Island Records, 2009)
- The Plastiscines - Another Kiss (Because Music, 2009)
- Don Diablo - I Am Not From France (Sellout Sessions, 2009)
- Del Marquis (Scissor Sisters) - Runaround (Guitsonic Music, 2009)
- The Amplid - Bernadette (Tracy Recordings, 2009)
- Team Waterpolo - Room 44 (Sony Music, 2009)
- Boy Crisis - Fountain of Youth (B-Unique Records, 2009)
- Bestrack - Wishmaker (Bouchemiture Recordings, 2009)
- The Phantoms Revenge - Absolute Ego Riot (Idiot House, 2008)

Mixtapes

- "SlothBoogie - Guestmix #451 | Louis La Roche" (2024)
- "Disco Infiltrators - Guest Mix | Louis La Roche" (2022)
- "Acid Stag - HUMP DAY MIX | Louis La Roche" (2019)
- "Drug & Mirrors Mixtape | Louis La Roche" (2017)
- "The Progression Playlist | Louis La Roche X Frank & Oak" (2014)
- Scenery Mixtape - Part 6 (THE END) (August 2014)
- Scenery Mixtape - Part 5 (May 2013)
- Scenery Mixtape - Part 4 (July 2012)
- Scenery Mixtape - Part 3 (July 2011)
- Scenery Mixtape - Part 2 (June 2011)
- Scenery Mixtape - Part 1 (May 2011)
