= Step into the Light (Darren Hayes song) =

Single by Darren Hayes

from the album This Delicate Thing We've Made
- Released: 8 April 2007
- Recorded: 2006–2007
- Genre: Pop, electronica
- Length: 4:57
- Label: Powdered Sugar
- Songwriter(s): Darren Hayes, Robert Conley

Darren Hayes singles chronology
"So Beautiful" (2005)	"Step into the Light" (2007)	"On the Verge of Something Wonderful" (2007)

"Step into the Light" is a song by Australian singer-songwriter Darren Hayes from his third solo album, This Delicate Thing We've Made. The track was remixed several times and a remix EP was released in April 2007 to promote the album in clubs and pubs. The song became popular in the United States, peaking at #5 on the Hot Dance Club Play chart. The album version of the song was revealed on YouTube in May 2007.

== Track listings ==
- UK promotional EP #1
1. "Step into the Light" (Hook N Sling Mix) – 7:23
2. "Step into the Light" (Moto Blanco Club Mix) – 8:13
3. "Step into the Light" (Moto Blanco Dub Mix) – 8:03
4. "Step into the Light" (Shave and Sugar Remix) – 7:26
5. "Step into the Light" (Shave and Sugar Dub) – 7:18
6. "Step into the Light" (Wayne G & Andy Allder Circuit Anthem) – 9:22
7. "Step into the Light" (Moto Blanco Radio Mix) – 3:15
- UK promotional EP #2
1. "Step into the Light" (Moto Blanco Club Mix) – 8:13
2. "Step into the Light" (Wayne G & Andy Allder Circuit Anthem) – 9:22
3. "Step into the Light" (Tony Moran Club Mix) – 8:54
4. "Step into the Light" (Dave Pezza Club Mix) – 8:30
5. "Step into the Light" (Shave and Sugar Remix) – 7:26
6. "Step into the Light" (Hook N Sling Mix) – 7:23
7. "Step into the Light" (Tony Moran Radio Mix) – 4:31
8. "Step into the Light" (Moto Blanco Radio Mix) – 3:15
- UK promotional EP #3
1. "Step into the Light" (Shave and Sugar Dub) – 7:18
2. "Step into the Light" (Hook N Sling Mix) – 7:23
3. "Step into the Light" (Moto Blanco Dub Mix) – 8:03
4. "Step into the Light" (Dave Pezza Dub Mix) – 8:30
5. "Step into the Light" (Shave and Sugar Remix) – 7:26
6. "Step into the Light" (Moto Blanco Club Mix) – 8:13
- US promotional EP #1
1. "Step into the Light" (Tony Moran Radio Mix) – 4:31
2. "Step into the Light" (Moto Blanco Radio Mix) – 3:15
3. "Step into the Light" (Tony Moran Club Mix) – 8:54
4. "Step into the Light" (Moto Blanco Club Mix) – 8:13
5. "Step into the Light" (Hook N Sling Mix) – 7:23
- US promotional EP #2
1. "Step into the Light" (Tony Moran Club Mix) – 8:54
2. "Step into the Light" (Moto Blanco Club Mix) – 8:13
3. "Step into the Light" (Moto Blanco Dub Mix) – 8:03
4. "Step into the Light" (Moto Blanco Club Vox-Up) – 8:13
5. "Step into the Light" (Dave Pezza Club Mix) – 8:30
6. "Step into the Light" (Dave Pezza Dub Mix) – 8:30
7. "Step into the Light" (Hook N Sling Mix) – 7:23

== Chart performance ==
Chart	Peak position
U.S. Billboard Hot Dance Club Play	5
