= Casey (song) =

Single by Darren Hayes

from the album This Delicate Thing We've Made
- B-side: "In Your Mother's Eyes"
- Released: 3 March 2008
- Recorded: 2007
- Genre: Synthpop, electronica
- Length: 4:44
- Label: Powdered Sugar
- Songwriter(s): Darren Hayes, Peter-John Vettese
- Producer(s): Vettese

Darren Hayes singles chronology
"Who Would Have Thought" (2007)	"Casey" (2008)	"Talk Talk Talk" (2011)

"Casey" is a song written by Darren Hayes and Peter-John Vettese for Hayes' album This Delicate Thing We've Made. It was released as the fourth and final single from the album, and was his first single to be a download-only release. It managed to chart at #108 in the UK. The original version of the song does not appear on any of the download singles, however a radio edit was made and released. An eighty-second clip of the music video was released by Hayes on his YouTube account on 22 December 2007. The full clip debuted on Hayes' official website and YouTube account on 26 January 2008.

== Track listings ==
- Digital download – live acoustic
1. "Casey" (live acoustic version) – 4:17
- Digital download – instrumental
1. "Casey" (instrumental) – 6:26
- Digital download – The Time Machine Tour
1. "Casey" (live from The Time Machine Tour) – 7:37
- Digital download – EP
1. "Casey" (live acoustic version) – 4:17
2. "Casey" (live from The Time Machine Tour) – 7:37
3. "Casey" (instrumental) – 6:26
4. "Casey" (music video)
- Promotional CD single
1. "Casey" (single edit) – 3:28
2. "Casey" (album version) – 4:44
- Darren Hayes' Sandbag Store digital single #1
1. "Casey" (a cappella version) – 6:26
2. "Words" – 3:27
- Darren Hayes' Sandbag Store digital single #2
1. "Casey" (live from the Time Machine Tour) – 7:37
2. "In Your Mother's Eyes" – 5:18
- Darren Hayes' Sandbag Store digital single #3
1. "Casey" (demo version) – 4:24
2. "Walk Away" – 3:11
- Darren Hayes' Sandbag Store "The Time Machine Tour Live" digital EP
1. "Casey" (Live in London, 3 February 2008) – 7:03
2. "Casey" (Live in London, 4 February 2008) – 7:12
3. "Casey" (Live in Manchester, 6 February 2008) – 8:11
4. "Casey" (Live in Manchester, 7 February 2008) – 7:36
5. "Casey" (Live in Bristol, 11 February 2008) – 6:59
6. "Casey" (Live in Brighton, 15 February 2008) – 7:27
7. "Casey" (Live in Birmingham, 17 February 2008) – 8:11
8. "Casey" (Live in Birmingham, 18 February 2008) – 9:22
9. "Casey" (Live in London, 24 February 2008) – 8:47
