= Who Would Have Thought =

Single by Darren Hayes

from the album This Delicate Thing We've Made
- B-side: "Breathless"; "The Only One"
- Released: 19 November 2007
- Recorded: 2007
- Genre: Pop, electronica
- Length: 4:15 (single edit); 4:44 (album version)
- Label: Powdered Sugar
- Songwriters: Darren Hayes, Guy Chambers
- Producer: Guy Chambers

Darren Hayes singles chronology
"Me, Myself and (I)" (2007)	"Who Would Have Thought" (2007)	"Casey" (2008)

"Who Would Have Thought" is a song written by Darren Hayes and Guy Chambers, for Hayes' third solo album This Delicate Thing We've Made, released as a limited-edition 7" vinyl and digital download alongside the "Me, Myself and (I)" single release. Hayes added an animated video for the song as a teaser on his official website, as well as his Myspace profile, on 9 April 2007. The single failed to chart due to its ineligibility as a promotional release. The b-side "The Only One" is included on the album This Delicate Thing We've Made.

== Track listings ==
- Promotional CD single
1. "Who Would Have Thought" (radio mix) – 3:34
- Digital download
1. "Who Would Have Thought" – 4:15
2. "Breathless" – 3:19
3. "The Only One" – 2:58
- 7" vinyl
1. "Who Would Have Thought" – 4:15
2. "Who Would Have Thought" (live acoustic version) – 3:58

== Chart performance ==
=== Weekly charts ===
Chart (2007)	Peak position
UK Physical Singles Chart	45
