= The Tension and the Spark =

Studio album by Darren Hayes
- Released: 13 September 2004
- Recorded: 2003–2004
- Genres: Electronica; electropop; synth-pop; dance-pop
- Length: 58:52 (International edition); 62:52 (Australian edition)
- Label: Columbia
- Producers: Darren Hayes, Robert Conley

Darren Hayes chronology
Spin (2002)	The Tension and the Spark (2004)	This Delicate Thing We've Made (2007)

Singles from The Tension and the Spark
- 1. "Pop!ular" Released: 12 July 2004; 2. "Darkness" Released: 6 November 2004

Professional ratings
Review scores
Source	Rating
AllMusic	4/5 stars
Stylus Magazine	A link

The Tension and the Spark is the second studio album by Darren Hayes, released in 2004. The album was a change for Hayes, who took a more electronic and darker style for this record and also delved deeper into more personal matter. The title of the album is derived from lyrics featured in the second track, "I Like the Way".

== Singles ==
- "Pop!ular" was released as the album's first single in July 2004 and became a hit, reaching #1 on the US Dance Chart, his first number one. NME praised the song, saying it was "A twistered masterclass in career reintervention...This guy is a genius."
- "Darkness" was released as the album's second single in November 2004, but it did not chart. The physical single has subsequently become a rarity, with copies selling for £100 plus on second-hand websites and collector's auctions.
- "Unlovable" was a promotional single for the album. While it was not released as a single of its own, the music video for the song was made.

== Track listing ==
All songs written and produced by Darren Hayes and Robert Conley, except where noted.

The Tension and the Spark track listing
No.	Title	Writer(s)	Producer(s)	Length
1.	"Darkness"			5:17
2.	"I Like the Way"			5:04
3.	"Light"			4:54
4.	"Pop!ular"		Hayes; Conley; Mark 'Spike' Stent	3:53
5.	"Dublin Sky"	Hayes		4:35
6.	"Hero"			4:26
7.	"Unlovable"			5:23
8.	"Void"	Hayes		3:19
9.	"I Forgive You"	Hayes; Marius de Vries	Hayes; de Vries	4:35
10.	"Feel"	Hayes		4:03
11.	"Love and Attraction"			4:05
12.	"Sense of Humor"			4:47
13.	"Ego"			4:31

Regional bonus track
No.	Title	Length
14.	"Boy"	4:00

Outtakes, B-sides and demos
No.	Title	Availability	Length
1.	"Touch"	B-side to the physical single of "Pop!ular" in Australia, and "Darkness" in the United Kingdom
2.	"Zero"	B-side to the physical single of "Pop!ular"
3.	"Random Blinking Light"	B-side to the physical single of "Darkness"
4.	"Strange Magic"	Recorded for the "Ella Enchanted O.S.T" in 2004 just prior to the release of the album as a favour to Tommy O'Haver for directing the "Strange Relationship" music video from the Spin album
5.	"Let's Go"	An out-take from the album, which later appeared as a B-side to the physical single of "Me Myself and (I)"
6.	"Boy"	A bonus track on the Australian, Japanese and British digital versions of the album
7.	"Timebomb"	An out-take from the album, which was revealed by Hayes on his Facebook in June 2012.

== Charts ==
Weekly chart performance for The Tension and the Spark
Chart (2004)	Peak position
Australian Albums (ARIA)	8
Swedish Albums (Sverigetopplistan)	32
UK Albums (Official Charts)	13

== Certifications ==
Certifications for The Tension and the Spark
Region	Certification	Certified units/sales
Australia (ARIA)	Gold	35,000^{^}
^{^} Shipments figures based on certification alone.
