= Insatiable (Darren Hayes song) =

2001 single by Darren Hayes

Single by Darren Hayes

from the album Spin
- B-side: "Ride" (demo); "Falling at Your Feet" (demo)
- Released: 10 December 2001
- Studio: Wallyworld (Marin County, California)
- Length: 5:10 (album version); 4:15 (radio edit)
- Label: Roadshow Music; Sony Music
- Songwriters: Darren Hayes; Walter Afanasieff
- Producer: Walter Afanasieff

Darren Hayes singles chronology
"Insatiable" (2001)	"Strange Relationship" (2002)

Music video
- "Insatiable" on YouTube

"Insatiable" is a song by the Australian singer-songwriter Darren Hayes, former lead singer of the Australian duo Savage Garden. It was released as the lead single from his solo debut studio album, Spin (2002). Written by Hayes and Savage Garden collaborator Walter Afanasieff, "Insatiable" received its world premiere on Capital FM London on 26 November 2001, before being released on 10 December 2001 to Australian radio airplay. It was commercially released on 14 January 2002 via Roadshow Music and Sony Music in Australia and Columbia Records internationally later on. When asked if any of his songs, either Savage Garden or solo songs, had a coded gay message prior to his coming out, Hayes named "Insatiable" as one of those songs.

The track proved to be a hit for Hayes in his native Australia, where it debuted and peaked at number three on the ARIA Singles Chart. Internationally, "Insatiable" reached number one in New Zealand and peaked within the top 10 in Denmark, Greece, Norway, Romania, Sweden, and the United Kingdom. In the United States, the song stalled at number 77 on the Billboard Hot 100 chart, which allegedly led to Columbia Records to drop all promotion and press of Spin in the country.

== Composition ==
According to the sheet music provided by Sony/ATV Music Publishing on Musicnotes.com, "Insatiable" is played in the key of F♯ minor and is played at a slow tempo of 72 beats per minute. Hayes' vocals range from E_{4}–C♯_{6}.

== Critical reception ==
Billboard editor Chuck Taylor wrote about the single positively, saying Hayes "oozes with such sensuality" and that although it does resemble some of Savage Garden's ballads, it is "breathtakingly beautiful". Taylor praised Hayes' falsetto and ended his review naming the track "Grade-A stuff". Manila Standard said the song showed a more "sensuously provocative side" to Hayes. Calling it "sultry and seductive in its attitude," Meriden, CT newspaper Record-Journal predicted the song would break Hayes away from his teenybopper audience. Spanish-language newspaper La Opinión praised the passion in his falsetto.

== Chart performance ==
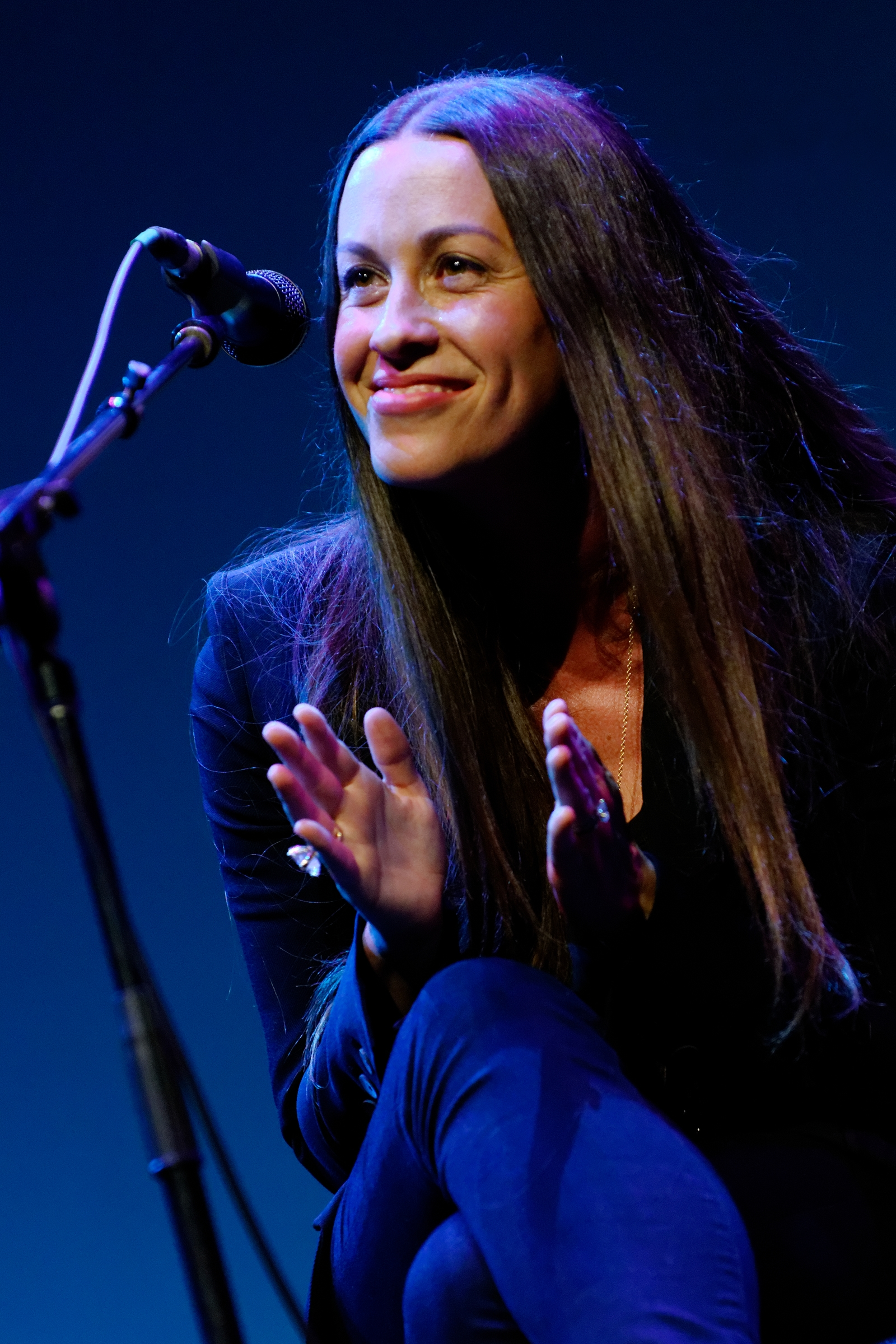
"Insatiable" displaced "Hands Clean" by Alanis Morissette (pictured in 2013) when it reached number one in New Zealand.

In Australia, "Insatiable" debuted at number three on the ARIA Singles Chart on the week of 27 January 2002, as well as number one on the Australian Artists chart. It spent six non-consecutive weeks in the top 10 and 19 weeks overall on the chart; "Insatiable" was Australia's 28th-best-selling hit of 2002 and third-best-selling from an Australian act. In neighboring New Zealand, the song debuted at number 47 on the RIANZ Singles Chart on 17 February 2002. It fell and rose on the chart before rising to the number-one position on 21 April 2002, spending a sole week at the top. It fell to number two the following week, having been displaced by the Calling's "Wherever You Will Go". "Insatiable" was the 15th-most-successful song of the year in the country.

Across Europe, "Insatiable" was a hit, rising to number 28 on the Eurochart Hot 100. In the United Kingdom, the single debuted and peaked at number eight on 30 March 2002, becoming Hayes' sole top-10 hit in the country as a solo artist. It charted for 19 weeks and was certified silver by the British Phonographic Industry (BPI). Across Scandinavia, it charted within the top 10 in Denmark, Norway, and Sweden and peaked at number 16 on the Finnish Singles Chart. In Germany and the Netherlands, it failed to reach the top 40.

In Canada, "Insatiable" peaked at number 11 on the Nielsen SoundScan chart. In neighboring United States, where Hayes had had two number-one hits as part of Savage Garden, "Insatiable" debuted at number 81 on the Billboard Hot 100 the week of 2 March 2002. During its third week charting, it reached a peak of number 77 and charted for only four more weeks. It remains Hayes' only chart entry as of 2026. It had some success on component Billboard charts, peaking at number 16 on the Adult Contemporary chart and number 11 on the Dance Club Play chart with the aid of remixes.

== Music video ==
The music video showcases Hayes looking at videos of an Italian starlet that he is infatuated with. The black-and-white visuals in the music video were based on 1960s Italian romances such as La dolce vita. Hayes is also shown with longer hair that has been dyed blonde, which is his natural hair colour.

Hayes said in a HuffPost piece in 2022 that although US label executives were initially enthusiastic about the song itself, after they were shown a rough cut of the video, they feared Hayes appeared "too gay" for American audiences and wanted to "overhaul" his image "so as not to scare off fans". In a 2022 interview with Billboard, he also added that he did not know that his team had hired a female model for the video: "They secretly cast a female, and filmed her on the days that I wasn't on set. They created a narrative in the edit where this woman was looking for me in a club. When I saw the edit put together, I was just horrified, because I was never trying to portray myself as a straight man."

== Track listings ==
Australian and New Zealand CD single

1. "Insatiable" (album version)
2. "Ride" (original demo recording)
3. "Falling at Your Feet" (original demo recording)

Australian and New Zealand CD single – Remixes

1. "Insatiable" (album version)
2. "Insatiable" (Calderone club mix)
3. "Insatiable" (Pablo Larosa's Funktified mix)
4. "Insatiable" (Specificus 'Insomniac' mix)
5. "Insatiable" ('dp versus Darren Hayes' mix)
6. "Insatiable" (Specificus 'Let It Go' mix)

European CD single

1. "Insatiable" (album version) – 5:10
2. "Falling at Your Feet" (original demo recording) – 4:59

UK CD1

1. "Insatiable" (album version) – 5:10
2. "Falling at Your Feet" (original demo recording) – 4:54
3. "Insatiable" (Specificus 'Insomniac' mix) – 6:00
4. "Insatiable" (video)

UK CD2

1. "Insatiable" (album version) – 5:10
2. "Ride" (original demo recording) – 4:46
3. "Insatiable" (Calderone radio edit) – 6:30

Japanese CD single

1. "Insatiable" (album version)
2. "Insatiable" (Specificus 'Insomniac' mix)
3. "Falling at Your Feet"

== Credits and personnel ==
Credits are lifted from the Spin album booklet.

Studios

- Recorded and mixed at Wallyworld Studios (Marin County, California)
- Orchestra recorded at Ocean Way Recording (Los Angeles)
- Mastered at Gateway Mastering (Portland, Maine, US)

Personnel

- Darren Hayes – writing, lead and background vocals, co-production
- Walter Afanasieff – writing, keyboards, bass, drum and rhythm programming, production, arrangement
- Bruce Dukov – violin
- Eve Butler – violin
- Susan Chatman – violin
- Charlie Everett – violin
- Gerry Hilera – violin
- Norm Hughes – violin
- Peter Kent – violin
- Jennifer Munday – violin
- Bob Peterson – violin
- Michele Richards – violin
- Bob Sanov – violin
- Ed Stein – violin
- John Wittenberg – violin
- John Hayhurst – viola
- Karen Elaine – viola
- Virginia Frazier – viola
- Andrew Picken – viola
- Larry Corbett – cello
- Suzie Katayama – cello, orchestral contracting
- Paula Hochhalter – cello
- Dan Smith – cello
- John Mitchell – contra-alto clarinet
- David Campbell – orchestral conducting and arrangement
- David Reitzas – orchestral engineering
- Robert Conley – programming, recording (vocals)
- Nick Thomas – engineering
- Chris Lord-Alge – mixing
- Bob Ludwig – mastering

== Charts ==
=== Weekly charts ===
2002 weekly chart performance for "Insatiable"
Chart (2002)	Peak position
Australia (ARIA)	3
Canada (Nielsen SoundScan)	11
Czech Republic (IFPI)	22
Denmark (Tracklisten)	3
Europe (Eurochart Hot 100)	28
Finland (Suomen virallinen lista)	16
Germany (GfK)	42
Greece (IFPI)	4
Hungary (Rádiós Top 40)	18
Hungary (Single Top 40)	20
Ireland (IRMA)	31
Italy (FIMI)	32
Latvia (Latvijas Top 40)	21
Netherlands (Single Top 100)	76
New Zealand (Recorded Music NZ)	1
Norway (VG-lista)	10
Romania (Romanian Top 100)	5
Scotland Singles (OCC)	11
Sweden (Sverigetopplistan)	8
Switzerland (Schweizer Hitparade)	55
UK Singles (OCC)	8
US Billboard Hot 100	77
US Adult Contemporary (Billboard)	16
US Adult Top 40 (Billboard)	33
US Dance Club Play (Billboard) Remixes	11
US Mainstream Top 40 (Billboard)	27
US Adult Contemporary (Radio & Records)	16
US CHR/Pop (Radio & Records)	26
US Hot AC (Radio & Records)	28

2025 weekly chart performance for "Insatiable"
Chart (2025)	Peak position
Moldova Airplay (TopHit)	92

=== Year-end charts ===
Year-end chart performance for "Insatiable"
Chart (2002)	Position
Australia (ARIA)	28
Canada (Nielsen SoundScan)	107
New Zealand (RIANZ)	15
Sweden (Hitlistan)	47
UK Singles (OCC)	49
UK Airplay (Music Week)	75
US Adult Contemporary (Billboard)	46
US Adult Contemporary (Radio & Records)	43
US Hot AC (Radio & Records)	99

== Certifications ==
Certifications for "Insatiable"
Region	Certification	Certified units/sales
Australia (ARIA)	Gold	35,000^{^}
United Kingdom (BPI)	Silver	200,000^{^}
^{^} Shipments figures based on certification alone.

== Release history ==
Release history and formats for "Insatiable"
Region	Date	Format(s)	Label(s)	Ref.
Australia	10 December 2001	Radio airplay	Roadshow Music; Sony Music	
United States	7 January 2002	Adult contemporary; hot adult contemporary radio	Columbia	
United States	11 January 2002	Contemporary hit radio	Columbia	
Australia	14 January 2002	CD	Roadshow Music; Sony Music	
Japan	6 March 2002	CD	Sony Int'l	
United Kingdom	18 March 2002	CD; cassette	Columbia	
