= Darren Hayes =

Australian musician and producer (born 1972)

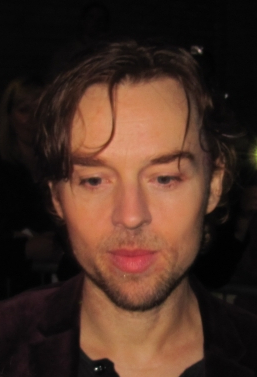
- Hayes in 2012
- Born: Darren Stanley Hayes; 8 May 1972 (age 54); Brisbane, Queensland, Australia
- Occupations: Singer; songwriter; music producer; composer
- Years active: 1993–present
- Spouses: Colby Taylor (m. 1994; div. 2000); Richard Cullen (m. 2006; div. 2024)
- Musical career
- Genres: Pop rock; electronic
- Instruments: Vocals, guitar
- Labels: Columbia; Powdered Sugar; Mercury
- Formerly of: Savage Garden
- Website: darrenhayes.com

Darren Stanley Hayes (born 8 May 1972) is an Australian singer, songwriter, music producer and composer. He was the singer of the pop duo Savage Garden from their 1993 establishment until their disbandment in 2001. Their 1997 album Savage Garden peaked at No. 1 in Australia, No. 2 in the United Kingdom, and No. 3 in the United States. It spawned the singles "I Want You", "To the Moon and Back", and Australian and US No. 1 hit "Truly Madly Deeply". The duo followed the success of their debut album with Affirmation (1999), which provided additional hits such as Australian and US No. 1 hit "I Knew I Loved You" and Australian No. 3 hit "The Animal Song".

Hayes released his first solo album, Spin, in 2002. The album sold two million copies worldwide, debuting at No. 2 in the UK and No. 3 in Australia. It delivered the hit single "Insatiable". Hayes's other solo albums are The Tension and the Spark (2004), the double album This Delicate Thing We've Made (2007), Secret Codes and Battleships (2011), and Homosexual (2022). Hayes's memoir, Unlovable, was published in November 2024.

== Early life and education ==
Darren Stanley Hayes was born on 8 May 1972 in Brisbane, Queensland. His parents are Robert (died 2023) and Judy Hayes (died 2025). Hayes has an older sister named Tracey and an older brother named Peter. Hayes has described his father as an alcoholic who regularly subjected Hayes and his mother to violence.

At school, Hayes was bullied and physically and verbally abused. He described himself as "a big-hearted, emotional, and excitable" teenager, with an obsession for Star Wars and E.T.

In late 1987, Hayes saw his hero, Michael Jackson, performing live in Brisbane as part of the Bad Tour. He credits this experience as having encouraged him to pursue a career in entertainment. Hayes's other acknowledged influences are Stevie Nicks, Madonna, Peter Gabriel, Annie Lennox, Prince and Marvin Gaye, and he has cited U2's "With or Without You" as the most touching song he has ever heard.

Hayes graduated from Mabel Park State High School. He studied journalism and teaching at Queensland University of Technology, but left college shortly before graduation after he and Savage Garden bandmate Daniel Jones signed a record deal.

== Music career ==
=== 1993–2001: Savage Garden ===
In mid-1993, Daniel Jones placed an ad in Brisbane street press Time Off seeking a vocalist for the group Red Edge. Hayes, who was studying at university and working as a record sales assistant, joined after his audition. Hayes's first performance with Red Edge was in front of an audience of four in Toowoomba. The five-piece version of Red Edge played pubs and clubs from southern Queensland to northern New South Wales, while Hayes and Jones started to write original material.

In June 1994, Hayes and Jones left Red Edge to work as a duo. Originally, they were known as Crush. By year's end, the pair had enough songs for a five-song demo tape under the name Bliss. They sent 150 copies to various record companies around the world. They were renamed Savage Garden after a phrase from The Vampire Chronicles by Anne Rice: "Beauty was a Savage Garden". John Woodruff (The Angels, Baby Animals, Diesel) provided a positive response; he became their talent manager and negotiated a contract with Roadshow Music/Warner Music. In 1995 they entered the studio to work on their debut album with producer Charles Fisher (Air Supply, Moving Pictures, 1927).

In May 1996, Savage Garden released their debut single "I Want You" under Roadshow Music. It peaked at No. 4 on the Australian Recording Industry Association (ARIA) singles chart, while on the 1996 End of Year Singles Chart it was highest placed by an Australian artist at No. 12. On 30 September of that year they received their first ARIA award nomination, in the category Breakthrough Artist – Single, for "I Want You". Their local success drew interest from international labels and they were signed for overseas releases with Columbia Records in late November. The label's executives had Woodruff arrange for Hayes and Jones to reside in a Kings Cross hotel for 8 months, where they wrote songs for a debut album to be released in 1997. In November 1996 a second single, "To the Moon and Back", was released and reached No. 1 in January 1997 in Australia.

"I Want You" was released in North America in February 1997, where it peaked at No. 4 on the United States Billboard Hot 100 and by April had achieved gold status according to Recording Industry Association of America (RIAA). It became their first number-one hit, reaching that spot on RPM's Top 100 Singles chart in Canada in June 1997. "Truly Madly Deeply", the band's third Australian single, was released in March; it also reached No. 1 and became their signature song.

In March 1997, the duo's debut album, Savage Garden, entered the Australian charts at No. 1 and peaked there for a total of 19 non-consecutive weeks. In June, the album reached No. 3 on the US Billboard 200 and was certified gold by RIAA. Savage Garden won a record of ten ARIA Awards in September 1997. By the end of 1998, "Truly Madly Deeply" was the most played song on US radio and became the only one-sided single to spend a year in the top 30 of the Billboard Hot 100. As of 2005, Savage Garden had been certified 12× platinum in Australia, 7× platinum in the US, 3× platinum in Canada, 2× platinum in New Zealand, Singapore, and the UK.

Savage Garden's second album, Affirmation, was issued in November 1999. According to Australian music journalist Ed Nimmervoll, it was "basically written by phone and computer from their separate corners of the world" with Hayes in New York and Jones in Brisbane. The lead single, "The Animal Song", appeared in February of that year, which was used in the romantic comedy film The Other Sister (1999); it became a No. 3 hit in Australia and Top 20 in the UK and US. In September, the duo released Affirmation's third single "I Knew I Loved You", which peaked at No. 4 in Australia and No. 10 in the UK. It peaked at No. 1 in Australia and later achieved 8× platinum. Within a month, it went platinum in the US, partly due to the single "I Knew I Loved You", which hit No. 1 on the Hot 100, also going platinum, and becoming the most-played single on US radio for the year. That track also reached No. 1 in Canada.

Savage Garden's success was reflected at the Billboard Music Awards, where they won Best Adult Contemporary Video and No. 1 Adult Contemporary Song of the Year, for "I Knew I Loved You", and No. 1 Adult Contemporary Artist of the Year. "I Knew I Loved You" stayed on the Monitor/Billboard Adult Contemporary Airplay Chart for 124 weeks. Savage Garden performed the title track at the 2000 Summer Olympics closing ceremony in October.

Hayes moved to Sausalito in 2000. He became the public face of the duo. Hayes announced that Savage Garden had broken up in October 2001 during a chat with an Australian journalist. Hayes thought the information would be saved for a later article; it was not. When confronted with this information during the early morning hours, before an unrelated interview, Jones denied the break-up of the band. Savage Garden had sold over 23 million albums by that stage.

Luciano Pavarotti and Darren Hayes sang "O Sole Mio" together in a concert in 2000.

John Woodruff, Savage Garden's manager, confirmed in 2005 that Jones had announced that he intended to leave Savage Garden prior to the promotion of Affirmation. Woodruff criticised the media for their treatment of Hayes. The duo have never issued a united statement regarding the situation, yet Hayes has guaranteed that Savage Garden will "never, by any chance" reunite. In 2020, he added: "Imagine if you had come out and survived a really dysfunctional and toxic relationship, and then for years later people would ask you to please get back in that relationship [...] I once said I'd only do it if it cured cancer and that's still how I feel."

=== 2002–2004: Spin and The Tension and the Spark ===
Hayes recorded his first solo album, Spin, which was released in 2002. The album was produced by Walter Afanasieff, the producer of Affirmation. Spin carried on in the same musical vein as Savage Garden, with a less soft rock sound and more edgy R&B vibe, although the first single "Insatiable" was a ballad, reaching Number 3 in Australia. Other singles "Strange Relationship", "Crush (1980 Me)" and "I Miss You" also performed well in charts. The album reached the Top 5 in Australia at Number 3, and in the UK at Number 2. It also reached the top ten in Denmark, Sweden and Finland. In the United States, the album failed to make the same impact as Savage Garden's previous releases, reaching Number 35 on Billboard. It was later re-issued with a bonus disc consisting of some live and studio tracks.

Hayes spent two years working on his second solo album, The Tension and the Spark. Other than the track "I Forgive You", which was produced with Madonna collaborator Marius De Vries, the entire album was produced by Hayes and Robert Conley (with whom he had previously toured and recorded "Crush (1980 Me)" for Spin and "Do You Believe" for Specificus). The album marked a bold change of direction for Hayes. Conley's production was almost entirely electronic, with acoustic instruments buried under walls of sequenced sounds. Although artistically this was a huge step forward and earned Hayes the strongest praise of his career, it alienated a large portion of his audience, who were expecting another album of radio-friendly pop songs. The first single, "Pop!ular", was released on 12 July 2004. This single reached Number One on the US Dance Charts, and fared well in the UK. Hayes's follow-up single, "Darkness", charted in the lower regions of the ARIA top 50 charts.

One of his out-takes from the Spin sessions, "When You Say You Love Me", was recorded by Clay Aiken in 2003 for his Measure of a Man album. It was later covered by Human Nature, resulting in an Australian top 20 single in April 2004 off their Walk The Tightrope album, and was then re-recorded in 2008 featuring Hayes himself.

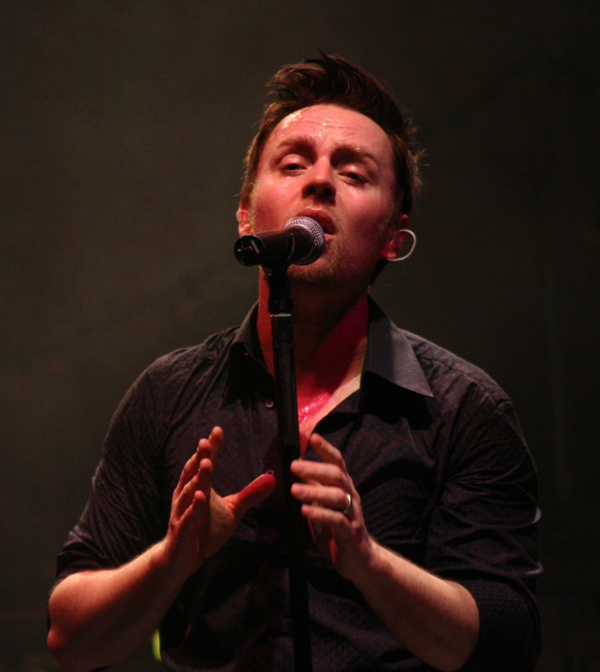
Darren Hayes performing on tour in 2006

=== 2005–2006: Truly Madly Completely and parting ways with Columbia ===
In 2005, Hayes recorded a track he wrote with Robert Conley called "So Beautiful", which was included on the Savage Garden greatest hits compilation, Truly Madly Completely: The Best of Savage Garden. The compilation also includes a second track by Hayes called "California". Both of these tracks hark back to Hayes's early sound, although still retaining some of the electronic flourishes from The Tension and the Spark.

On 9 July 2006, Hayes announced that he had parted ways with Columbia Records after ten years and 24 million album sales together.

The tour following this release saw Hayes play the iconic Sydney Opera House. The performance was recorded and released on a DVD titled A Big Night in with Darren Hayes.

=== 2007–2010: This Delicate Thing We've Made and We Are Smug ===
After leaving Columbia, Hayes created his own Powdered Sugar record label for the release of This Delicate Thing We've Made.

"At first I was terrified, because I presumed I was going to get a deal for this record and sell it on. But as the conceptual time-travel idea started to emerge I was definitely aware that the path I was taking was making it harder and harder to take to a new label. I did meet with Angel — a tiny offshoot pop label of EMI — who we brought in on the latter half of the recording process. They got really excited but I shut down the process when they started saying "We really love it but can we have copies to give to our executives to see if they can live with it?" I thought, "I've passed that point. I'm making this record the way I want, I've hired the mix engineer and the people I want, the song sequence has been on a white board for several months and I have the front cover".

Hayes finished recording his third solo album, This Delicate Thing We've Made, in 2007. The album was a double-disc, with 25 tracks. Many of the tracks were co-written with Robert Conley, and a great deal of the album was written with and produced by Justin Shave, who played keyboards for part of Hayes's Time Machine tour. The album was released on 20 August 2007, while the first single, "On the Verge of Something Wonderful", was released in Australia on 28 July 2007, and in the UK and online on 6 August 2007.

On 9 April 2007, Hayes released the album track "Who Would Have Thought" from This Delicate Thing We've Made as a teaser track on his official website, as well as his MySpace profile. This was accompanied by an animation for the song created by his partner, animator and director, Richard Cullen. Around April 2007, remixes of the album track "Step into the Light" were being played in clubs around the world. The album version of "Step into the Light" was released as a teaser on Hayes's official website and MySpace on 30 April 2007.

During the first half of 2007, Hayes performed selected songs from the album in The Time Machine World Tour small, exclusive gigs around the world. Tickets for several of these much sought after shows sold out in under ten minutes. In June 2007, Hayes embarked on a small tour of USA and Canada, stopping in New York, Toronto, Chicago, San Francisco and Los Angeles, along with the band Temposhark. The shows were well received with very positive reviews.

On 30 June 2007, Hayes headlined the London Gay Pride at Trafalgar Square. He performed "I Want You" and "On the Verge of Something Wonderful", as well as a medley that included "Pop!ular".

In July 2007, Hayes announced The Time Machine Tour that would start out in the UK, and then move on to Hayes's home country Australia. On 29 July 2007, "On the Verge of Something Wonderful" was the most selected music video on The Box in the UK. On 20 August 2007, This Delicate Thing We've Made was released in the UK, America and Australia. 'The Time Machine Tour' included venues such as The Royal Albert Hall and the State Theatre in Sydney. His stage was again designed by Willie Williams and included a large bridge that could extend over the first few rows of seats. On the final night, at the Queensland Performing Arts Centre in Hayes's hometown of Brisbane, the performance was recorded in HD for a DVD release. The Time Machine Tour DVD came out in two editions: the special edition which was limited to 2000 copies and contained a four-panel, fold-out, gleaming white box, a thirty-two-page colour booklet with 300 photos and notes from the artist, and the regular edition. The special edition DVD, which was only available from Hayes's website, was shipped to purchasers on 1 July, and the regular edition, which was available in shops, was released on 22 July.

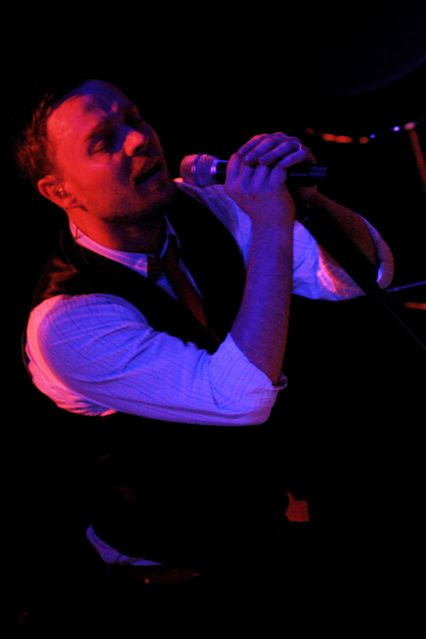
Hayes performing in 2008

Hayes did a mini tour in the US in November and December 2007, making appearances at Borders stores and performing two shows in New York City and Philadelphia.

On 18 December 2007, Hayes announced "The Side Two Tour". The show toured the UK in February 2008 and featured Hayes performing songs from This Delicate Thing We've Made that were not featured on "The Time Machine Tour", in a more intimate setting. In late 2008, the DVD This Delicate Film We've Made was announced. The DVD featured selected songs from the album, arranged in a new sequence, and set to visuals that told a loose, abstract animated narrative. The DVD entered the UK music DVD charts at Number 1.

On 19 April 2009, Hayes teased via Twitter that he was preparing another album. On 8 May, Hayes announced, via his MySpace page, that he and Robert Conley had produced an album together titled We Are Smug. The ten-track album, with a fair amount of experimentation with both lyrics and music, was made available via a link from his MySpace page, and was made free to download to gauge acceptability of Hayes's shifting musical styles. The album is heavily electronic with some heavy beats. It also contains some explicit content. Both Hayes and Conley share vocal duties on this album.

Hayes signed to Sony ATV Music Publishing for a worldwide deal in August 2009. Emma Banks from CAA UK came on board October 2009 to represent Hayes for his touring plans around the new album.

Although the album was completed before the holidays in 2009, Hayes announced in early 2010 that he had more song ideas and he was going back into the studio, which delayed the album another year. Hayes completely finished his fourth solo album in mid-2010, working with top writer/producers from around the world and having the record mixed by Robert Orton.

Hayes also recorded a song for the Finn tribute album He Will Have His Way, a cover of "Not Even Close". It was released on Halloween 2010.

=== 2011–2021: Secret Codes and Battleships and hiatus ===
On 17 April 2011, Hayes announced that he had signed a record deal with Mercury Records/Universal Music Australia and signed to EMI Services UK /Europe. He released his fourth studio album in October 2011. The first single titled "Talk Talk Talk" was announced in May and was released on 24 June. The single contains a cover version of Madonna's "Angel" as the B-side.

It was announced on 20 June, via Hayes's Facebook page, that his new album would be titled Secret Codes and Battleships.

Hayes announced on Twitter on 22 July that he was shooting a second music video from the album. On 14 August, he revealed in a radio interview that "Black Out the Sun" will be the second single from Secret Codes and Battleships. Since its release in the UK, BBC Radio 2 has selected the track to feature on their A list the week commencing 1 October 2011. He later confirmed, on Twitter, that this song will be the single for the UK and other international markets, while "Bloodstained Heart" would be the second single in Australia. Hayes played dates on "The Secret" Tour in the UK and Australia beginning on 15 October in Liverpool. Hayes tweeted, on 2 March 2012, that he would be shooting another music video the week after. He later confirmed the music video was being shot for "Stupid Mistake", which was released as the album's fourth single in May 2012.

Since 2013, Hayes stopped his music career and tried to build a stand-up comedy career. At the same time, he kept creating short singing videos in his social media accounts for his fans. In a 2022 interview with Queerty, Hayes said that he had actually planned to retire at that point. In 2018 Hayes briefly returned on stage with one-off performance of two songs, including "I Knew I Loved You". In 2019, Hayes featured on Cub Sport's single "I Never Cried So Much in My Whole Life". He did not appear in the official video. In 2020 he recorded a new version of "Truly Madly Deeply" with slightly modified lyrics. The video of his studio performance was released on YouTube on 24 April.

=== 2022–present: Homosexual, tour and memoir ===
On 26 January 2022, Hayes released the single, "Let's Try Being in Love". A music video for the song was released the same day, starring Hayes and featuring actor Scott Evans. The video was directed by Andrew Putschoegl. Referred to as a "queer anthem" by NME, in promotional interviews, Hayes explained "I've been married to Richard [Cullen] for almost 17 years, [and] I'm in this really comfortable place in my life. But at the same time at mid-life I'm grieving the fact I never got to celebrate who I really was at the period of my life where I was most famous. I look at this world we live in now where someone like Lil Nas X can push forward his true self, full of pride and self-love and have the chance to be loved for who he truly is [...] A lot of the time I was my most famous, I was deeply sad." Less than 24 hours of release, "Let's Try Being in Love" debuted at number 96 on the Official UK Singles Download Chart Top 100 and at number 98 on the Official UK Singles Sales Chart Top 100. The single also peaked at number 9 on the Australian Independent singles chart. "I wanted to show I love the feminine in me, be proud of the gay me. There's a dance scene that is so passionate, everything's alive and thriving and blooming. That's how I feel in general about music. And that's a hugely sharp contrast to how I felt 10 years ago."

On 27 January 2022, Hayes announced he would be headlining the 2022 Sydney Gay and Lesbian Mardi Gras Parade and would be performing on 5 March 2022. Hayes performed "The Animal Song", "I Want You", "Affirmation" plus, live for the very first time, "Let's Try Being in Love".

On 2 March 2022, Hayes announced the Do You Remember? Tour that would be performed in six Australian cities between January and February 2023 and would feature songs from his musical career as part of Savage Garden and as a solo artist. On 10 March 2022, Hayes released the single "Do You Remember?", following with the official video on 16 March 2022. In June 2022, Hayes released "Poison Blood", which details his life living with depression, and others affected by it. Hayes released the official "Poison Blood" music video on 26 June 2022, announcing UK Tour dates on the same day. A remix of "Let's Try Being in Love" was released on 15 July 2022, with production helmed by Louis La Roche. This was followed on 29 July by Roche's remix to "Do You Remember?". On 18 August 2022, Hayes announced that Homosexual, his fifth studio album, would be released that October. A fourth single, "All You Pretty Things", was released on 19 August 2022. When the album was released on 7 October 2022, Hayes said "My new album was born from a desire to rid myself of the grief I developed over the years I lost to shame growing up in a world where being gay was met with rejection and condemnation. I wanted to revisit my teenage years with the wisdom of a proud 50-year-old gay man and revisit my youthful memories and view them through this new peach-tinted lens of joy. I imagined an adolescence where I could be loved for who I truly am today. Through this music, my goal was to reclaim my happiness and reclaim my identity. That confidence gave me the courage to explore deep wounds in my life and explore old trauma from the perspective of an effervescent endless summer." Homosexual debuted at number 6 on the Australian Digital Albums and number 16 on the Australian Artist Albums Chart. The album debuted at number 82 on the UK Albums Chart, also placing on the UK Download and Album Sales charts, placing at numbers 3 and 13, respectively.

In April 2023, Hayes graced the cover of Washington, DC's Metro Weekly. The magazine featured a 13-page pictorial and Q&A about Hayes's past career and recently concluded Do You Remember? tour. On 10 February 2023, Australian electronic band Peking Duk released a remake of "I Want You" with re-recorded vocals from Hayes. On 1 May 2023, Hayes released an official music video for "Feels Like It's Over", directed by Andrew Huebscher. An edited version of the song was released as the fifth single from Homosexual on 12 May 2023. In June 2023, it was announced that Hayes's memoir would be published in 2024. In November 2023, Hayes competed as Grim Reaper on the fifth season of The Masked Singer Australia. After eight performances, he ended up in second place on the season, behind Dami Im. Hayes's memoir, Unlovable, was released on 5 November 2024.

In November 2025, Hayes announced two concert dates for February 2026 at the West Hollywood club Troubadour, which sold out in twenty minutes.

== Other media ==
In December 2014, Hayes announced a comedy podcast "The He Said, He Said Show". The podcast debuted on 10 February 2015. Rosie O'Donnell has appeared as a guest. The podcast ended its run at the end of the year. Hayes has co-hosted a comedic movie review podcast with writer and comedian Anthony Armentano called "We Paid to See This". Some of Hayes's sketch comedy can be found on his YouTube page including a Star Wars spoof documentary and several of his sketches he wrote and performed during his time studying at The Groundlings Theatre and School. On 13 March 2016, Hayes announced he had been writing an original musical with writer and comedian Johnny Menke. As of March 2022, the musical has yet to be publicly performed or recorded.

== Personal life ==
=== Relationships and sexuality ===
Hayes married his childhood sweetheart, makeup artist Colby Taylor, in 1994. They were still married when Savage Garden "skyrocketed to fame around the globe in the late 1990s." They separated in 1998 and were divorced in 2000. Many of the lyrics from the band's second album, Affirmation, dealt with his divorce.

Hayes recorded Affirmation in San Francisco in mid-1999 and eventually bought a house there. He also maintained a base in London since 2004. In 2013, Hayes moved to Los Angeles.

Hayes started coming out as gay to friends and the head of his label, Sony, in the early 2000s. He entered into a private marriage ceremony with his boyfriend of two years, Richard Cullen, on 23 July 2005 in London. On 19 June 2006, also in London, they entered into a formal civil partnership. Hayes and Cullen applied for a marriage licence in California and were married on 15 July 2013, showing their support for those fighting for same-sex marriage. Though public speculation about his sexual orientation had been present throughout his career, Hayes had previously kept his personal life private. He announced the event the day prior on his official website. Before the announcement, Cullen's name had appeared on the website as the designer of the cover for Hayes's single "So Beautiful". In a 2017 interview with Attitude, Hayes commented, "I don't regret [publicly coming out] for a second. It wasn't that I was blacklisted, but it was that I became a 'niche' artist purely based on my sexuality. There was a kind of unintentionally patronizing view of me. No longer a sexual object, but more of someone you might take home to Mom [...] I was suddenly your gay uncle. That was frustrating. My sexuality was used as a descriptor, and if you think about it, that's nuts. No one says 'Openly heterosexual singer Adele.' "

In May 2023, Hayes shared a statement confirming his separation from Cullen, in which he said:

"After 17 years of marriage to the best person I ever met, Richard and I have chosen to accept that our union has gently and beautifully come to rest. In honour of this realisation, we separated earlier this year and have been supporting each other emotionally throughout this massive change in our lives. Because people will ask, let me answer the ugly questions to get them out of the way forever – no, there's no scandal to report, no infidelity, guilty or third party. It's just life. We adore each other and always will. We view our marriage as our greatest collaboration. Nobody can ever take away what we achieved together. We are still best friends. We always will be."

Hayes announced via his Instagram on 16 September 2024, that his and Cullen's divorce was finalised on 29 August in London.

=== Health ===
Hayes has often been open about his mental health struggles and his depression due to hiding his sexuality while in Savage Garden. He said, "I was deeply unhappy, barely containing secrets that would soon devastate me emotionally and send me to the brink of suicide at the height of my fame." While promoting his 2022 single "Poison Blood", Hayes told Retro Pop Magazine: "I describe my depression as a blessing, a gift and a curse all at once. I wouldn't wish it upon my worst enemy and yet I'm aware I am a deeply sensitive person, and that my unique brain allows me to feel depths of emotions that many people don't experience [...] I have learned to use those moments to channel melodies and stories that I hope are so real and so relatable they might reach someone else who is in pain, like me, and remind them to stay, like I choose to, every single day." In 2023, Hayes elaborated, "I think we always have to remember that each one of us is essential and that we change and improve everybody's lives. Everybody is affected positively by our place on this earth. Every time that I've had a thought about wishing that I wasn't here, when the mood passes, the next day, something trivial will happen, and I think, "I'm so glad I was here to witness that." And that trivial moment can be as simple as having the best mac and cheese ever, or as brilliant as Madonna releasing a new song."

In April 2025, Hayes disclosed that he was recovering from surgery after having collapsed three times while trying to get out of bed on 17 March 2025. Hayes incurred life-threatening injuries, shattering his left jaw bone and several teeth and losing blood. He required reconstructive surgery with the use of a titanium brace. Hayes had intended to keep the accident private, but chose to disclose it due to an extensive recovery period that prevented him from working; he spent two months with his jaw wired shut. The cause of the fainting is unknown, but cardiac and neurological causes were ruled out.

=== Interests ===
Hayes is a Star Wars fan, and has been since childhood. He also collects Star Wars memorabilia, and he even auditioned for a role in Star Wars: Episode III – Revenge of the Sith. After JoJo's Bizarre Adventure licensed the Savage Garden song "I Want You" to be used in the television adaptation of Diamond Is Unbreakable, Hayes expressed his gratitude and also revealed that he is a fan of the series.

== Discography ==
Studio albums

- Spin (2002)
- The Tension and the Spark (2004)
- This Delicate Thing We've Made (2007)
- Secret Codes and Battleships (2011)
- Homosexual (2022)

== Awards and nominations ==
=== APRA Awards ===
The Australasian Performing Right Association awards were established by APRA in 1982 to honour the achievements of songwriters and music composers.

Year	Nominee / work	Award	Result	Ref.
1998	"To the Moon and Back" (Darren Hayes & Daniel Jones)	Song of the Year	Nominated	
1998	"To the Moon and Back" (Darren Hayes & Daniel Jones)	Most Performed Australian Work	Nominated	
1998	"Truly Madly Deeply" (Darren Hayes & Daniel Jones)	Song of the Year	Nominated	
1998	"Truly Madly Deeply" (Darren Hayes & Daniel Jones)	Most Performed Australian Work	Nominated	
1998	Darren Hayes and Daniel Jones	Songwriter of the Year	Won	
1998	"I Want You" (Darren Hayes & Daniel Jones)	Most Performed Australian Work Overseas	Won	
1999	"Truly Madly Deeply" (Darren Hayes & Daniel Jones)	Most Performed Australian Work Overseas	Won	
2000	"Truly Madly Deeply" (Darren Hayes & Daniel Jones)	Most Performed Australian Work Overseas	Won	
2000	"I Knew I Loved You" (Darren Hayes & Daniel Jones)	Song of the Year	Nominated	
2000	"I Knew I Loved You" (Darren Hayes & Daniel Jones)	Most Performed Australian Work	Nominated	
2000	"The Animal Song" (Darren Hayes & Daniel Jones)	Most Performed Australian Work	Won	
2000	Darren Hayes and Daniel Jones	Songwriter of the Year	Won	
2001	"I Knew I Loved You" (Darren Hayes & Daniel Jones)	Most Performed Australian Work Overseas	Won	
2001	"Affirmation" (Darren Hayes & Daniel Jones)	Most Performed Australian Work	Nominated	
2001	"Crash and Burn" (Darren Hayes & Daniel Jones)	Most Performed Australian Work	Nominated	
2002	"Hold Me" (Darren Hayes & Daniel Jones)	Most Performed Australian Work	Won	
2002	"Crash and Burn" (Darren Hayes & Daniel Jones)	Most Performed Australian Work Overseas	Won	
2003	"I Knew I Loved You" (Darren Hayes & Daniel Jones)	Most Performed Australian Work Overseas	Won	
2003	"Insatiable" (Darren Hayes & Walter Afanasieff)	Most Performed Australian Work	Nominated	
2005	"Truly Madly Deeply" (Darren Hayes & Daniel Jones)	Most Performed Australian Work Overseas	Nominated	

=== ARIA Awards ===
The ARIA Music Awards have been presented by the Australian Record Industry Association (ARIA) since 1987.

Year	Nominee / work	Award	Result	Ref.
2000	Affirmation	Producer of the Year	Nominated	

=== Other Awards ===
Year	Awards	Work	Category	Result
2002	BT Digital Music Awards	Himself	People's Choice Award	Nominated
2002	Top of the Pops Awards	Himself	Top Fan Site	Won
2002	Smash Hits Poll Winners Party	Himself	Best International Act	Nominated
2002	Smash Hits Poll Winners Party	Himself	Best Live Act	Nominated
2002	Smash Hits Poll Winners Party	Himself	Best Male Solo	Nominated
2002	Smash Hits Poll Winners Party	Spin	Best Album	Nominated
2003	Lunas del Auditorio	Himself	Best Foreign Pop Artist	Nominated
