= List of songs written by Walter Afanasieff =

This is an alphabetical list of the songs known to have been written or co-written by Walter Afanasieff.

Key
†	Indicates single release

Songs written by Afanasieff, with original artists, co-writers and originating album, showing year released.
Title	Artist(s)	Co-writer(s)	Originating album	Year	Ref.
"Affirmation" †	Savage Garden	Darren Hayes; Daniel Jones	Affirmation	1999	
"After Hours" (Note: 2012 album "Wild Butterfly" by Russian artist Yuliya Nachalova. 2015 Single "Zhdi menya" (Wait for me) Duet by Julia Nachalova & Walter Afanasieff)	Kenny G	Kenny G	Heart and Soul	2010	
"All I Want for Christmas Is You" †	Mariah Carey	Mariah Carey	Merry Christmas	1994	
"Always in Love"	Trey Lorenz	Trey Lorenz; Mariah Carey	Trey Lorenz	1992	
"Am I The Only One"	Marc Anthony	Marc Anthony	Marc Anthony	1999	
"Beauty and the Beast (1991 film)"	Peabo Bryson and Celine Dion	Alan Menken; Howard Ashman	Beauty and the Beast: Original Motion Picture Soundtrack	1991	
"Aladdin (1992 Disney film)"	Regina Belle and Peabo Bryson	Alan Menken; Howard Ashman; Tim Rice	Aladdin	1992	
"The Hunchback of Notre Dame (1996 film)"	All-4-One	Alan Menken; Stephen Schwartz	The Hunchback of Notre Dame	1996	
"Hercules (1997 film)"	Michael Bolton	Alan Menken; David Zippel	Hercules	1997	
"The Animal Song" †	Savage Garden	Darren Hayes; Daniel Jones	Affirmation	1999	
"Anytime You Need a Friend" †	Mariah Carey	Mariah Carey	Music Box	1993	
"April Rain"	Kenny G	Kenny G	Brazilian Nights	2015	
"Believe"	Jonathan Miller		So Much Stronger	2012	
"Be My Lady (你是我的女人)" †	Andy Lau and Kenny G	Andy Lau; Preston Lee; Kenny G; T.K. Chan	Be My Lady (你是我的女人) / Stupid Kid (笨小孩)	1998	
"The Best Thing" †	Savage Garden	Darren Hayes; Daniel Jones	Affirmation	1999	
"Bossa Réal"	Kenny G	Kenny G	Brazilian Nights	2015	
"Brasilia"	Kenny G	Kenny G	Rhythm & Romance	2008	
"Brazil"	Kenny G	Kenny G	Paradise	2002	
"Brazilian Nights"	Kenny G	Kenny G	Brazilian Nights	2015	
"Broken Vow"	Lara Fabian	Lara Fabian	Lara Fabian	1999	
"Brown Eyes"	Destiny's Child	Beyoncé Knowles	Survivor	2000	
"Bu Bossa"	Kenny G	Kenny G	Brazilian Nights	2015	
"Butterfly" †	Mariah Carey	Mariah Carey	Butterfly	1997	
"Chained to You" †	Savage Garden	Darren Hayes; Daniel Jones	Affirmation	1999	
"Can't Let Go" †	Mariah Carey	Mariah Carey	Emotions	1991	
"Can You Stop the Rain" †	Peabo Bryson	John Bettis	Can You Stop the Rain	1991	
"The Center of My Heart"	Michael Bolton	Michael Bolton; Billy Mann	Only A Woman Like You	2002	
"The Champion's Theme"	Kenny G	Kenny G	The Moment	1996	
"The Chanukah Song"	Kenny G	Kenny G	Miracles: The Holiday Album	1994	
"Close My Eyes"	Mariah Carey	Mariah Carey	Butterfly	1997	
"Copa De Amor"	Kenny G	Kenny G	Rhythm & Romance	2008	
"Cracks of My Broken Heart"	Eric Benét	Eric Benét; Tim Blixseth; Jonathan Clark	Hurricane	2005	
"Crash and Burn" †	Savage Garden	Darren Hayes; Daniel Jones	Affirmation	1999	
"Dance the Night Away"	Lionel Richie	Lionel Richie	Renaissance	2000	
"Dancing in the Rain"	Robi Rosa	Billy Mann; Robi Rosa	Mad Love	2004	
"Dazzling Girl"	Shinee	Drew Ryan Scott; Rob. A!; Justin Trugman; Jaakko Manninen; Rx	Boys Meet U	2013	
"December Prayer"	Yvonne Catterfeld	Charlie Midnight; Idina Menzel	Blau im Blau	2010	
"Déjà Vu"	Kenny G	Kenny G	Heart and Soul	2010	
"Dirty"	Darren Hayes	Darren Hayes	Spin	2002	
"Do You Think of Me"	Mariah Carey	Mariah Carey; Mark C. Rooney; Mark Morales	B-side to "Dreamlover"	1993	
"Don't Let Me Leave"	Marc Anthony	Marc Anthony	Marc Anthony	1999	
"Don't Make Me Wait for Love"	Kenny G	Preston Glass; Narada Michael Walden	Duotones	1986	
"Encore"	Kenny G	Kenny G	Heart and Soul	2010	
"Eres La Luz"	Santana	Carlos Santana; Karl Perazzo; Andy Vargas	Shape Shifter	2012	
"Es Hora De Decir"	Kenny G (featuring Camila)	Claudia Brant	Rhythm & Romance	2008	
"Eternal Light (A Chanukah Song)"	Kenny G	Kenny G	Faith: A Holiday Album	1999	
"Everything Fades Away"	Mariah Carey	Mariah Carey	Music Box	1993	
"Fall Again"	Kenny G	Robin Thicke	Heart and Soul	2010	
"Falling in the Moonlight"	Kenny G	Kenny G	Paradise	2002	
"Fiesta Loca"	Kenny G	Kenny G	Rhythm & Romance	2008	
"Fly Away (Butterfly Reprise)"	Mariah Carey	Mariah Carey	Butterfly	1997	
"Forever" †	Mariah Carey	Mariah Carey	Daydream	1995	
"Forgive and Forget"	Sam Bailey	Steve Dorff; Lindsay Vinarsky; Kim Viera	Sing My Heart Out	2016	
"Forgiveness"	Clarence Clemons	Clarence Clemons; Narada Michael Walden	A Night with Mr. C	1989	
"Fourth of July"	Mariah Carey	Mariah Carey	Butterfly	1997	
"G-Bop"	Kenny G	Dan Shea; Kenny G	Breathless	1992	
"G-Walkin'"	Kenny G	Kenny G	Heart and Soul	2010	
"Getaway"	Richard Marx	Richard Marx	Beautiful Goodbye	2014	
"Gettin' on the Step"	Kenny G	Kenny G	The Moment	1996	
"Gira Con Me"	Josh Groban	Lucio Quarantotto; David Foster	Josh Groban	2001	
"Gone with the Wind"	Vanessa Hudgens	Maimouna Youseff; Kara DioGuardi; Emanuel Kiriakou; Zukhan Bey; Brandon Howard	Identified	2008	
"Good Enough"	Darren Hayes	Darren Hayes	Spin	2002	
"Gunning Down Romance"	Savage Garden	Darren Hayes; Daniel Jones	Affirmation	1999	
"Harmony"	Kenny G	Kenny G	Paradise	2002	
"Havana"	Kenny G	Kenny G	The Moment	1996	
"Heart and Soul"	Kenny G	Kenny G	Heart and Soul	2010	
"Heart Attack"	Darren Hayes	Darren Hayes	Spin	2002	
"The Heart Wants What It Wants"	Darren Hayes	Darren Hayes	Spin	2002	
"Here I Am"	Leona Lewis	Brett James; Leona Lewis	Spirit	2007	
"Hero" †	Mariah Carey	Mariah Carey	Music Box	1993	
"Héroe"	Mariah Carey	Mariah Carey	Music Box	1993	
"Hold Me" †	Savage Garden	Darren Hayes; Daniel Jones	Affirmation	1999	
"Home on Christmas Day"	Kristin Chenoweth	Jay Landers	A Lovely Way to Spend Christmas	2008	
"How Often"	Kevon Edmonds	Babyface; Robin Thicke	24/7	1999	
"I Always Cry At Christmas"	Richard Page (featuring Walter Afanasieff)	Richard Page	Non-album release	2008	
"I Am Free"	Mariah Carey	Mariah Carey	Daydream	1995	
"I Can't Take This Anymore"	Paul Anka	Paul Anka; Kathy Stone	A Body of Work	1998	
"I Don't Know You Anymore"	Savage Garden	Darren Hayes; Daniel Jones	Affirmation	1999	
"I Don't Know Why I Love You"	Joey McIntyre	Joey McIntyre; Scot Sax	Meet Joe Mac	2001	
"I Knew I Loved You" †	Savage Garden	Darren Hayes; Daniel Jones	Affirmation	1999	
"I'm Not a Warrior" †	Son Seung-yeon	—N/a	Non-album release	2019	
"I See You"	Mika	Mika	The Boy Who Knew Too Much	2009	
"If You Could See Me Now"	Celine Dion	John Bettis	Celine Dion	1992	
"If You Go Away" †	New Kids on the Block	John Bettis; Trey Lorenz	H.I.T.S. / Face the Music	1991 / 1994	
"Innocence"	Kenny G	Kenny G	The Moment	1996	
"Insatiable" †	Darren Hayes	Darren Hayes	Spin	2002	
"Io Ci Sarò"	Andrea Bocelli (featuring Lang Lang)	Andrea Bocelli; David Foster; Eugenio Finardi	Vivere: Live in Tuscany	2008	
"Jesus Born on This Day"	Mariah Carey	Mariah Carey	Merry Christmas	1994	
"Just One Dream"	Heather Headley	John Bettis	This Is Who I Am	2002	
"Just to Hold You Once Again"	Mariah Carey	Mariah Carey	Music Box	1993	
"L'Ora Dell'Addio" †	Josh Groban	Josh Groban; Marco Marinangeli	Illuminations	2010	
"Lead the Way"	Mariah Carey	Mariah Carey	Glitter	2001	
"Letters from Home"	Kenny G	Kenny G	Heart and Soul	2010	
"Liberty"	Carly Paoli	—N/a	Live At Cadogan Hall	2018	
"Licence to Kill"	Michael Kamen (featuring Gladys Knight)	John Barry; Jeffrey Cohen; Narada Michael Walden	Licence to Kill OST	1989	
"Looking In"	Mariah Carey	Mariah Carey	Daydream	1995	
"Love Between Me And You"	Puff Johnson	Puff Johnson	Miracle	1996	
"Love With My Eyes Closed"	Michael Bolton	Michael Bolton; Billy Mann	Only A Woman Like You	2002	
"The Lover After Me"	Savage Garden	Darren Hayes; Daniel Jones	Affirmation	1999	
"Mad Love"	Robi Rosa	Billy Mann; Robi Rosa	Mad Love	2004	
"Magic of Love"	Russell Watson and Lionel Richie	Lionel Richie; Marilyn Bergman; Alan Bergman	Encore	2002	
"Malibu Dreams"	Kenny G	Kenny G	Paradise	2002	
"Macumba in Budapest"	Santana	Carlos Santana	Shape Shifter	2012	
"Midnight Magic"	Kenny G	Kenny G	Paradise	2002	
"Mirame Bailar"	Kenny G (featuring Barbara Muñoz)	Claudia Brant	Rhythm & Romance	2008	
"Miss You Most (At Christmas Time)"	Mariah Carey	Mariah Carey	Merry Christmas	1994	
"Miracles"	Kenny G	Kenny G	Miracles: The Holiday Album	1994	
"Missing You Now" †	Michael Bolton (featuring Kenny G	Michael Bolton; Diane Warren	Time, Love & Tenderness	1991	
"Moonlight"	Kenny G	Kenny G	The Moment	1996	
"Morning"	Kenny G	Kenny G	Breathless	1992	
"Music Box"	Mariah Carey	Mariah Carey	Music Box	1993	
"My All" †	Mariah Carey	Mariah Carey	Butterfly	1997	
"My Baby You" †	Marc Anthony	Marc Anthony	Marc Anthony	1999	
"My Devotion"	Kenny G	Kenny G	Heart and Soul	2010	
"My Heart Still Beats"	Destiny’s Child (featuring Beyoncé Knowles)	Beyoncé Knowles	Survivor	2001	
"My Prayer"	Eric Benét	Eric Benét; John Lang	Hurricane	2005	
"Natural Ride"	Kenny G	Kenny G	Breathless	1992	
"Never Get Enough of Your Love"	Michael Bolton	Michael Bolton; Diane Warren	The One Thing	1993	
"A Night To Remember"	Johnny Mathis (featuring Gladys Knight)	Jay Landers	A Night To Remember	2008	
"Night Train (Smooth Alligator)"	Lionel Richie	Narada Michael Walden; Preston Glass; Sade; Ray St. John	Dancing on the Ceiling	1986	
"Noche Fría"	Robi Rosa	Luis Gómez-Escolar; Robi Rosa	Mad Love	2004	
"Northern Lights"	Kenny G	Kenny G	The Moment	1996	
"Not Yet Lovers (戀人未滿)"	S.H.E	Beyoncé Knowles; Derek Shih	Girls' Dorm (女生宿舍)	2001	
"Ocean Breeze"	Kenny G	Kenny G	Paradise	2002	
"Once In A Lifetime"	Michael Bolton	Michael Bolton; Diane Warren	Only You OST	1994	
"One Breath"	Kenny G	Kenny G	Heart and Soul	2010	
"One More Time"	Kenny G (featuring Chanté Moore)	—N/a	Paradise	2002	
"One Sweet Day" †	Mariah Carey and Boyz II Men	Michael McCary; Nathan Morris; Wanya Morris; Shawn Stockman	Daydream	1995	
"Ordinary World"	Katharine McPhee	Emanuel Kiriakou; Lindy Robbins	Katharine McPhee	2007	
"Outside"	Mariah Carey	Mariah Carey	Butterfly	1997	
"Outside My Window"	Puff Johnson	Renaldo Benson; Alfred W. Cleveland; Marvin Gaye; Puff Johnson	Miracle	1996	
"Paradise"	Kenny G	Kenny G	Paradise	2002	
"Passages of Time"	Yōko Oginome	Narada Michael Walden; Jeffrey Cohen	Verge of Love	1988	
"Pastel"	Kenny G	Kenny G; Preston Glass	Silhouette	1988	
"Peace"	Kenny G	Kenny G	Paradise	2002	
"Per Te"	Josh Groban	Marco Marinangeli; Josh Groban	Closer	2003	
"Permanent Monday"	Jordin Sparks	Emanuel Kiriakou; Lindy Robbins	Jordin Sparks	2007	
"Peruvian Nights"	Kenny G	Kenny G	Rhythm & Romance	2008	
"The Promise"	Kenny G	Kenny G	Heart and Soul	2010	
"Remember"	Kenny G	Kenny G	The Moment	1996	
"Rhythm in My Heart"	Stacy Earl	John Bettis	Stacy Earl	1991	
"Ritmo Y Romance (Rhythm & Romance)"	Kenny G	Kenny G	Rhythm & Romance	2008	
"Roses"	Darren Hayes	Darren Hayes	Secret Codes and Battleships	2011	
"Salsa Kenny"	Kenny G	Kenny G	Rhythm & Romance	2008	
"Save Me"	Michael Bolton	Michael Bolton	Time, Love & Tenderness	1991	
"Sax-O-Loco"	Kenny G	Kenny G	Rhythm & Romance	2008	
"Seaside Jam"	Kenny G	Kenny G	Paradise	2002	
"Sentimental"	Kenny G	Kenny G	Breathless	1992	
"She Bangs" †	Ricky Martin	Desmond Child; Robi Draco Rosa	Paradise	2002	
"Since You Walked into My Life"	New Kids on the Block	Jordan Knight; John Bettis	Face the Music	1994	
"Sincera"	Josh Groban	Josh Groban; Marco Marinangeli	All That Echoes	2013	
"Sister Rose"	Kenny G	Kenny G	Breathless	1992	
"So Blessed"	Mariah Carey	Mariah Carey	Emotions	1991	
"Someone to Hold" †	Trey Lorenz	Trey Lorenz; Mariah Carey	Trey Lorenz	1992	
"Something About You"	Yōko Oginome	Narada Michael Walden; Liz Jackson	Verge of Love	1988	
"Something About You"	D'atra Hicks	Narada Michael Walden; Liz Jackson	D'Atra Hicks	1989	
"Soul of My Soul"	Michael Bolton	Michael Bolton; Diane Warren	The One Thing	1993	
"Souvenirs"	Phyllis Hyman	Narada Michael Walden	Forever with You	1998	
"Spanish Nights"	Kenny G	Kenny G	Paradise	2002	
"Spin"	Darren Hayes	Darren Hayes	Spin	2002	
"Still with You"	Eric Benét	Eric Benét; Tim Blixseth	Hurricane	2005	
"Summer Love"	Kenny G	Kenny G	Brazilian Nights	2015	
"Sunrise"	Kenny G	Kenny G; Adrian Bradford	Heart and Soul	2010	
"Sweet Forgiveness"	Barbra Streisand	John Bettis	Release Me 2	2021	
"Tango"	Kenny G	Kenny G	Rhythm & Romance	2008	
"Tell Him"	Barbra Streisand	David Foster; Linda Thompson	Higher Ground	1997	
"Tell Him"	Celine Dion and Barbra Streisand	David Foster; Linda Thompson	Let's Talk About Love	1997	
"That Somebody Was You"	Kenny G and Toni Braxton	Kenny G; Babyface	The Moment	1996	
"This Could Be the Night"	Yōko Oginome	Narada Michael Walden; Liz Jackson	Verge of Love	1988	
"Till the End of Time"	Mariah Carey	Mariah Carey	Emotions	1991	
"To Fall in Love Again"	Jessica Simpson	Nick Lachey	Irresistible	2001	
"Too Many Times"	George Benson	Preston Glass	While the City Sleeps...	1986	
"Two Beds and a Coffee Machine"	Savage Garden	Darren Hayes; Daniel Jones	Affirmation	1999	
"Un Amore Per Sempre"	Josh Groban	Marco Marinangeli	Josh Groban	2001	
"Unbroken Dreams"	Cody Karey	Johan Fransson; Tim Larsson; Tobias Lundgren; Charlie Midnight	Cody Karey	2013	
"Under Your Wings"	Lin Yu-chun	Jorgen Kjell; Michelle R. Lewis	It's My Time	2010	
"Underneath the Stars"	Mariah Carey	Mariah Carey	Daydream	1995	
"Walkin' My Baby Back home"	Joey McIntyre	Joey McIntyre	Meet Joe Mac	2001	
"Walls"	Barbra Streisand	Alan Bergman; Marilyn Bergman	Walls	2018	
"The Wedding Song"	Kenny G	Kenny G	Breathless	1992	
"When I Saw You"	Mariah Carey	Mariah Carey	Daydream	1995	
"Whenever You Call"	Mariah Carey	Mariah Carey	Butterfly	1997	
"Whenever You Call"	Mariah Carey and Brian McKnight	Mariah Carey	#1's	1998	
"When You Told Me You Loved Me"	Jessica Simpson	Billy Mann	Irresistible	2001	
"Why Couldn't It Be Christmas Every Day?"	Bianca Ryan	Jay Landers	Bianca Ryan	2006	
"You Are My Heart"	Lara Fabian	Rick Allison; Lara Fabian; John Bettis	Lara Fabian	1999	
"You Can Still Be Free"	Savage Garden	Darren Hayes; Daniel Jones	Affirmation	1999	
"You Make Me Believe"	Kenny G	Kenny G; Preston Glass; Narada Michael Walden	Duotones	1986	
"You're Not From Here"	Lara Fabian	Rick Allison; Lara Fabian; John Bettis	Lara Fabian	1999	
"You're the Only Place"	Nick Lachey	Billy Mann	SoulO	2003	
"No One There (To Sing Me a Love Song)"	Dionne Warwick	Narada Michael Walden; Preston Glass; Randy Jackson	Friends	1985	
"Zaustavi Vrijeme"	Tereza Kesovija	David Foster; Lucio Quarantotto; Margit Antauer	A L'Olympia	2008	
