= The Best Thing (Savage Garden song) =

2001 single by Savage Garden

Single by Savage Garden

from the album Affirmation
- Released: 12 March 2001
- Length: 4:19
- Label: Columbia
- Songwriter(s): Darren Hayes; Daniel Jones; Walter Afanasieff
- Producer(s): Walter Afanasieff

Savage Garden singles chronology
"Hold Me" (2000)	"The Best Thing" (2001)

Audio video
- "The Best Thing" on YouTube

"The Best Thing" is a song by Australian pop group Savage Garden, released as the seventh and final single from their second studio album Affirmation (1999) on 12 March 2001 exclusively to the United Kingdom and Europe.

== Background ==
"The Best Thing" was released as a single on 12 March 2001, exclusively in the United Kingdom and Europe. It was the last single released by the group before their split in October 2001. The single's cover art was also used for the album's fifth Australian single, "Chained to You". No official music video was made.

The song's lyrics describe the contrasting feelings of being irresistibly attracted to a person while being too frightened to admit that attraction. The "best thing" represents the strongly positive perceptions a person may have of the one they feel attracted to.

The group's performance from the Superstars and Cannonballs DVD was made into a music video, which eventually aired on MTV. This song was one of Savage Garden's few singles that did not make the cut for their greatest hits compilation Truly Madly Completely: The Best of Savage Garden.

"The Best Thing" was best known for being the first song to kick off the concerts promoting their second album. The song charted in the United Kingdom at number 35 on the UK Singles Chart.

== Track listing ==
All tracks written by Darren Hayes and Daniel Jones.

UK CD single

1. "The Best Thing" – 4:19
2. "Chained to You" – 4:08
3. "Hold Me" (live in Brisbane, May 2000) – 4:52

UK cassette single

1. "The Best Thing" – 4:19
2. "Hold Me" (live in Brisbane, May 2000) – 4:52

European CD single

1. "The Best Thing" (UK radio edit) – 3:41
2. "Affirmation" (live) – 5:48

European maxi-CD single

1. "The Best Thing" (radio edit) – 3:41
2. "Affirmation" (live) – 5:48
3. "I Want You" (live) – 3:50
4. "I Knew I Loved You" (live) – 8:15

== Charts ==
Chart (2001)	Peak position
Latvia (Latvijas Top 30)	16
Scotland (OCC)	30
UK Singles (OCC)	35
