= Affirmation World Tour =

2000 concert tour by Savage Garden

- Tour by Savage Garden
- Promotional poster for the tour
- Associated album: Affirmation
- Start date: 2 April 2000
- End date: 17 December 2000
- Legs: 4
- No. of shows: 7 in Asia; 16 in Australia; 37 in North America; 21 in Europe; 3 in Africa; 84 total

Savage Garden concert chronology
- Future of Earthly Delites Tour (1998); Affirmation World Tour (2000)

The Affirmation World Tour was the third and final concert tour by Australian group, Savage Garden. The tour was launched to support their second studio album, Affirmation (1999). The tour played over 80 shows in Asia, Australia, North America, Europe and Africa.

Concerts in Brisbane were recorded and released to video in 2001. Superstars and Cannonballs includes concert footage and the documentary, "Parallel Lives" and music videos.

== Opening acts ==
- Vanessa Amorosi (Australia)
- Kina (North America)
- S.O.A.P. (Europe)
- Nine Days (North America)

== Setlist ==
The following setlist was obtained from the 8 December 2000 concert, held at the Point Theatre in Dublin, Ireland. It does not represent all concerts for the duration of the tour.

1. "The Best Thing"
2. "Break Me Shake Me"
3. "To the Moon and Back"
4. "The Lover After Me"
5. "I Don't Know You Anymore"
6. "Santa Monica"
7. "Two Beds and a Coffee Machine"
8. "You Can Still Be Free"
9. "The Animal Song"
10. "Hold Me"
11. "Gunning Down Romance"
12. "Crash and Burn"
13. "Truly Madly Deeply"
14. "Chained to You"
15. "I Want You"
16. "I Knew I Loved You"
17. "Affirmation"

== Tour dates ==
Date	City	Country	Venue
Asia
2 April 2000	Tokyo	Japan	NHK Hall
4 April 2000	Yokohama	Japan	Kanagawa Kenmin Hall
5 April 2000	Akasaka	Japan	Akasaka Blitz
7 April 2000	Fukuoka	Japan	Fukuoka Skala Espacio
8 April 2000	Osaka	Japan	Zepp Osaka
10 April 2000	Nagoya	Japan	Nagoya Diamond Hall
12 April 2000	Tokyo	Japan	NHK Hall
Australia
28 April 2000	Cairns	Australia	CCC Great Hall
29 April 2000	Townsville	Australia	Townsville Entertainment Centre
1 May 2000	Melbourne	Australia	Rod Laver Arena
2 May 2000	Melbourne	Australia	Rod Laver Arena
4 May 2000	Adelaide	Australia	Adelaide Entertainment Centre
6 May 2000	Perth	Australia	Perth Entertainment Centre
7 May 2000	Perth	Australia	Perth Entertainment Centre
10 May 2000	Canberra	Australia	Canberra Theatre
13 May 2000	Sydney	Australia	Sydney Entertainment Centre
14 May 2000	Sydney	Australia	Sydney Entertainment Centre
16 May 2000	Newcastle	Australia	Newcastle Entertainment Centre
17 May 2000	Wollongong	Australia	Wollongong Entertainment Centre
20 May 2000	Brisbane	Australia	Brisbane Entertainment Centre
21 May 2000	Brisbane	Australia	Brisbane Entertainment Centre
24 May 2000	Launceston	Australia	Silverdome
25 May 2000	Hobart	Australia	Derwent Entertainment Centre
North America
14 July 2000^{[A]}	Augusta	United States	Fort Gordon
15 July 2000^{[A]}	Jacksonville	United States	Camp Lejeune
17 July 2000	Orlando	United States	Hard Rock Live
18 July 2000	Sunrise	United States	Sunrise Musical Theater
20 July 2000	Myrtle Beach	United States	Palace Theatre
22 July 2000	Philadelphia	United States	Mann Center for the Performing Arts
24 July 2000	Boston	United States	FleetBoston Pavilion
25 July 2000	New York City	United States	Radio City Music Hall
27 July 2000^{[B]}	Troy	United States	Alparon Park
28 July 2000	Boston	United States	FleetBoston Pavilion
29 July 2000^{[C]}	Bristow	United States	Nissan Pavilion
31 July 2000	Montreal	Canada	Théâtre du Centre Molson
1 August 2000	Toronto	Canada	Molson Canadian Amphitheatre
2 August 2000^{[E]}	Ionia	United States	Country Fresh Grandstand
5 August 2000^{[E]}	Columbus	United States	Celeste Center
6 August 2000^{[F]}	West Allis	United States	Wisconsin State Fair Grandstand
9 August 2000^{[G]}	Bethlehem	United States	PPL RiverPlace
11 August 2000^{[H]}	Fairlea	United States	Allegheny Power Grandstand
13 August 2000^{[I]}	Springfield	United States	Illinois State Fairgrounds Grandstand
14 August 2000^{[J]}	Midland	United States	Midland County Fair Grandstand
17 August 2000^{[K]}	Sedalia	United States	Missouri State Fair Grandstand
18 August 2000	Chicago	United States	Auditorium Theatre
19 August 2000^{[L]}	Lima	United States	Infield Grandstand
21 August 2000^{[M]}	Interlochen	United States	Kresge Auditorium
22 August 2000	Rochester Hills	United States	Meadow Brook Music Festival
25 August 2000	Denver	United States	Fillmore Auditorium
26 August 2000^{[N]}	Pueblo	United States	Colorado State Fair Events Center
28 August 2000	Saskatoon	Canada	Saskatchewan Place
29 August 2000	Calgary	Canada	Pengrowth Saddledome
30 August 2000	Edmonton	Canada	Skyreach Centre
1 September 2000	Vancouver	Canada	General Motors Place
2 September 2000^{[O]}	Seattle	United States	Memorial Stadium
3 September 2000^{[P]}	Portland	United States	Tom McCall Waterfront Park
6 September 2000	Concord	United States	Chronicle Pavilion
8 September 2000	Los Angeles	United States	Universal Amphitheatre
9 September 2000	San Diego	United States	SDSU Open Air Theatre
10 September 2000	Las Vegas	United States	House of Blues
13 September 2000	Minneapolis	United States	Orpheum Theatre
Europe
9 November 2000	Newcastle	England	Telewest Arena
10 November 2000	Birmingham	England	NEC Arena
12 November 2000	Paris	France	L'Olympia
14 November 2000	Utrecht	Netherlands	Muziekcentrum Vredenburg
15 November 2000	Hamburg	Germany	Große Freiheit 36
17 November 2000	Copenhagen	Denmark	Valby-Hallen
18 November 2000	Gothenburg	Sweden	Scandinavium
20 November 2000	Stockholm	Sweden	Annexet
22 November 2000	Helsinki	Finland	Hartwall Areena
23 November 2000	Tallinn	Estonia	Eesti Näituste Messikeskus
26 November 2000	Herning	Denmark	Herning Kongrescenter
28 November 2000	Berlin	Germany	Columbiahalle
29 November 2000	Nottingham	England	Nottingham Arena
30 November 2000	Manchester	England	Manchester Evening News Arena
2 December 2000	Munich	Germany	Großen Elser-Halle
4 December 2000	Milan	Italy	Discoteca Alcatraz
5 December 2000	Bern	Switzerland	Festhalle Bern
6 December 2000	Cologne	Germany	E-Werk
8 December 2000	Dublin	Ireland	Point Theatre
9 December 2000	Manchester	England	Manchester Evening News Arena
11 December 2000	London	England	London Arena
Africa
14 December 2000	Johannesburg	South Africa	MTN Sundome
15 December 2000	Durban	South Africa	ABSA Stadium
17 December 2000	Bellville	South Africa	Bellville Velodrome

Festivals and other miscellaneous performances

^{A} This concert was a part of the "Uncle Sam Jam"
^{B} This concert was a part of the "Troy Fair"
^{C} This concert was a part of "Z 4 All"
^{D} This concert was a part of the "Ionia Free Fair"
^{E} This concert was a part of the "Ohio State Fair"
^{F} This concert was a part of the "Wisconsin State Fair"
^{G} This concert was a part of "Musikfest"
^{H} This concert was a part of the "State Fair of West Virginia"
^{I} This concert was a part of the "Illinois State Fair"
^{J} This concert was a part of the "Midland County Fair"
^{K} This concert was a part of the "Missouri State Fair"
^{L} This concert was a part of the "Allen County Fair"
^{M} This concert was a part of the "Interlochen Arts Festival"
^{N} This concert was a part of the "Colorado State Fair"
^{O} This concert was a part of "Bumbershoot"
^{P} This concert was a part of the "Last Chance Summer Dance"

Cancellations and rescheduled shows

14 July 2000	Augusta, Georgia	Augusta-Richmond County Civic Center	Moved to Fort Gordon
14 August 2000	Midland, Michigan	Midland Center for the Arts	Moved to the Midland County Fair Grandstand
3 September 2000	Portland, Oregon	Portland Meadows	Moved to the Tom McCall Waterfront Park
28 November 2000	Berlin, Germany	Postbahnhof	Moved to Columbiahalle
29 November 2000	Prague, Czech Republic	Zimní stadion Eden	Cancelled
30 November 2000	Vienna, Austria	Libro Music Hall	Cancelled

== Personnel ==
Band

- Drums: Karl Lewis
- Guitar: Ben Carey and Daniel Jones
- Bass guitar: Lee Novak
- Keyboards: Jennifer Blakeman and Daniel Jones
- Backing vocalists: Angela Bekker, Elisa Fiorillo and Anna Maria La Spina

Crew

- Tour manager: Peter McFee
  - Assistant tour manager: Susie Steadman
- Stage manager: Colin Skals
- Wardrobe: Nina De Palma
- Production design: Willy Williams and Bruce Ramus
- Lighting director: Bruce Ramus
  - Lighting operator: Sean Hackett
- FOH Engineer: Colin Ellis
- Monitor engineer: Scott Pike
- Guitar technician: Adrian Dessent and Lindsay McKay
- Drum technician: Simon Moran
