= Walter Afanasieff discography =

American songwriter/producer Walter Afanasieff has been credited with composing, producing, arranging, performing on or programming one or more tracks on the following albums or singles:

Year	Album/Single	Artist	Credit
1982	Ivory Expedition	Tom Coster	Keyboards, String Arrangements
1982	Looking at Girls	The Toons	Synthesizer
1984	Starchild	Teena Marie	Synthesizer
1985	Nature of Things	Narada Michael Walden	Composer, keyboards
1985	Hero	Clarence Clemons & the Red Bank Rockers	Keyboards
1985	Fired Up	Larry Graham	Keyboards
1985	Who's Zoomin' Who?	Aretha Franklin	Keyboards
1985	Champion	Jeff Berlin & Vox Humana	Keyboards, programming
1986	Aretha	Aretha Franklin	Keyboards
1986	Dancing on the Ceiling	Lionel Richie	Composer
1986	Duotones	Kenny G	Composer, keyboards
1986	Passion from a Woman	Krystol	Keyboards, Sequencing
1986	While the City Sleeps...	George Benson	Keyboards, Synthesizers
1987	Whitney	Whitney Houston	Keyboards
1987	Happy Anniversary, Charlie Brown!	Various Artists	Keyboards
1987	No Protection	Starship	Keyboards
1988	Silhouette	Kenny G	Composer, keyboards
1988	Verge of Love	Yōko Oginome	Composer, Synthesizers, Drum Programming
1989	Stay with Me	Regina Belle	Assistant Producer, Keyboards, Programming
1989	Kenny G Live	Kenny G	Keyboards
1989	Be Yourself	Patti LaBelle	Keyboards
1989	Good to Be Back	Natalie Cole	Keyboards, programming
1989	Through the Storm	Aretha Franklin	Keyboards, programming
1989	D'Atra Hicks	D'Atra Hicks	Producer, arranger, keyboards, programming
1989	So Happy	Eddie Murphy	Producer, keyboards
1989	Night with Mr. C	Clarence Clemons	Producer, keyboards, programming
1990	I'm Your Baby Tonight	Whitney Houston	Keyboards
1990	Mariah Carey	Mariah Carey	Keyboards, programming
1991	Burnin'	Patti LaBelle	Keyboards, programming
1991	Disney's Beauty and the Beast Original Soundtrack	Alan Menken & Howard Ashman	Producer, arranger
1991	Can You Stop the Rain	Peabo Bryson	Producer, arranger, keyboards, programming
1991	Time, Love & Tenderness	Michael Bolton	Producer, composer, arranger, keyboards, programming
1991	Emotions	Mariah Carey	Producer, composer, arranger, keyboards, programming
1992	Back Again!!!	Milira	Keyboards
1992	The Bodyguard: Original Soundtrack Album	Original Soundtrack	Producer
1992	Aladdin [Original Soundtrack]	Alan Menken	Producer, arranger
1992	MTV Unplugged	Mariah Carey	Producer, composer, arranger, keyboards
1992	Timeless: The Classics	Michael Bolton	Producer, arranger, keyboards, programming
1992	Breathless	Kenny G	Producer, composer, arranger, keyboards, programming
1992	Celine Dion	Celine Dion	Producer, arranger, keyboards, programming
1992	Trey Lorenz	Trey Lorenz	Producer, composer, arranger, keyboards, programming
1993	For Our Children: The Concert	Disney	Arranger
1993	Soul Alone	Daryl Hall	Composer
1993	The Colour of My Love	Celine Dion	Producer
1993	Dreamlover (song)	Mariah Carey	Producer, arranger
1993	Passion	Regina Belle	Producer, arranger, keyboards, programming
1993	One Thing	Michael Bolton	Producer, arranger, keyboards, programming
1993	Music Box	Mariah Carey	Producer, arranger, keyboards, programming
1994	Miracle on 34th Street [Original Soundtrack]	Bruce Broughton	Arranger, multi instruments
1994	Music Behind the Magic	Disney	Producer, arranger
1994	Without You	Mariah Carey	Producer, arranger
1994	Never Forget You	Mariah Carey	Producer, arranger
1994	Anytime You Need a Friend	Mariah Carey	Producer, arranger
1994	Endless Love	Luther Vandross	Producer, arranger
1994	Miracles: The Holiday Album	Kenny G	Producer, arranger, keyboards, programming
1994	Through the Fire	Peabo Bryson	Producer, arranger, keyboards, programming
1994	Only You [Music from the Motion Picture]	Original Soundtrack	Producer, arranger, keyboards, programming
1994	Face the Music	New Kids on the Block	Producer, arranger, keyboards, programming
1994	Songs	Luther Vandross	Producer, arranger, keyboards, programming
1994	Merry Christmas	Mariah Carey	Producer, composer, arranger, keyboards, programming
1995	Diamante	Zucchero	Piano, keyboards
1995	Daydream	Mariah Carey	Producer, arranger, keyboards, programming
1995	A Very Fine Love	Dusty Springfield	Producer, arranger, programming
1995	One Sweet Day	Mariah Carey & Boyz II Men	Producer, composer, arranger
1996	Nada Es Igual	Luis Miguel	Arranger
1996	Fantasy: Mariah Carey at Madison Square Garden (Video)	Mariah Carey	Composer, producer, Music Direction
1996	Soulful Strut	Grover Washington Jr.	Executive Producer, Arranger
1996	Someday	All-4-One	Producer, arranger
1996	Disney's Hunchback of Notre Dame [Original Soundtrack] || Original Soundtrack	Producer, arranger	
1996	This Is the Time	Michael Bolton	Producer, composer, arranger, keyboards, programming
1996	Miracle	Puff Johnson	Producer, arranger, keyboards, programming
1996	The Moment	Kenny G	Producer, composer, arranger, keyboards, programming
1997	Merry Christmas from Vienna	Plácido Domingo/Ying Huang/Michael Bolton	Arranger
1997	Unimaginable Life	Kenny Loggins	Keyboards
1997	In Deep	Tina Arena	Producer
1997	Havana (song)	Kenny G	Producer, composer
1997	Diana, Princess of Wales: Tribute	Various Artists	Producer, arranger
1997	Smile Like Yours	Original Soundtrack	Producer, arranger
1997	Go the Distance (song)	Michael Bolton	Producer, arranger
1997	Disney's Hercules Original Score	Alan Menken	Producer, arranger
1997	All That Matters	Michael Bolton	Producer, arranger, keyboards, programming
1997	Butterfly	Mariah Carey	Producer, arranger, keyboards, programming
1997	Let's Talk About Love	Celine Dion	Producer, arranger, keyboards, programming
1997	Higher Ground	Barbra Streisand	Producer, arranger, keyboards, programming
1997	Open Road	Gary Barlow	Producer, keyboards, programming
1997	Allure	Allure	Producer, keyboards, programming
1998	Crossroads	Jeff Berlin	Keyboards
1998	From the Soul of Man	Kenny Lattimore	Producer, arranger, keyboards, programming
1998	My All (song)	Mariah Carey	Keyboards, programming
1998	These Are Special Times	Celine Dion	Keyboards, programming
1998	My Heart Will Go On	Celine Dion	Producer, arranger
1998	Hits	New Kids on the Block	Producer, arranger, keyboards, programming
1998	Todo el Amor	Myriam Hernandez	Producer, arranger, keyboards, programming
1998	Christmas with Babyface	Babyface	Producer, arranger, keyboards, programming
1998	Body of Work	Paul Anka	Producer, composer, arranger
1998	Forever with You	Phyllis Hyman	Composer
1999	24-7	Kevon Edmonds	Composer
1999	Pavarotti & Friends For The Children Of Guatemala And	Luciano Pavarotti/Boyzone/Mariah Carey/J	Keyboards, programming
1999	Can't Stop Dreaming	Daryl Hall	Producer
1999	I Knew I Loved You	Savage Garden	Producer, arranger
1999	Faith: A Holiday Album	Kenny G	Producer, arranger
1999	Stay the Same	Joey McIntyre	Producer, arranger
1999	Classics in the Key of G	Kenny G	Producer, arranger, keyboards, programming
1999	Affirmation	Savage Garden	Producer, arranger, keyboards, programming
1999	Marc Anthony	Marc Anthony	Producer, arranger, keyboards, programming
1999	CoCo's Party	CoCo Lee	Producer, arranger, keyboards, programming
1999	All the Way... A Decade of Song	Celine Dion	Producer, arranger, keyboards, programming
1999	Extras	Boyz II Men	Producer, arranger, keyboards, programming
1999	Love Like Ours	Barbra Streisand	Producer, arranger, keyboards, programming
1999	Ricky Martin	Ricky Martin	Producer, programming
1999	Animal Song	Savage Garden	Producer, keyboards, programming
2000	Seul	Garou	Arranger, keyboards, programming
2000	It's About Me	Phyllis Hyman	Composer
2000	Pavarotti and Friends for Cambodia and Tibet	Luciano Pavarotti & Friends	Keyboards, programming
2000	She Bangs	Ricky Martin	Producer
2000	What's in Your World	Daryl Hall	Producer
2000	Crash & Burn	Savage Garden	Producer, arranger
2000	Hurricane [Original Soundtrack]	Original Soundtrack	Producer, arranger
2000	Sound Loaded	Ricky Martin	Producer, arranger, keyboards, programming
2000	Lara Fabian	Lara Fabian	Producer, arranger, keyboards, programming
2000	Souvenirs	Tina Arena	Producer, Co-Coordinator
2000	Valentines	Mariah Carey	Producer, composer, arranger, keyboards, programming
2001	Meet Joe Mac	Joey McIntyre	Bass, Organ (Hammond)
2001	Historia	Ricky Martin	Producer
2001	Nobody Wants to Be Lonely	Ricky Martin & Christina Aguilera	Producer, arranger
2001	All I Want for Christmas Is You	Mariah Carey	Producer, arranger
2001	Renaissance	Lionel Richie	Producer, arranger, keyboards, programming
2001	Josh Groban	Josh Groban	Producer, arranger, keyboards, programming
2001	Irresistible	Jessica Simpson	Producer, arranger, keyboards, programming
2001	Survivor	Destiny's Child	Producer, arranger, keyboards, programming
2002	Joy to the World	Michael Bolton	Arranger
2002	Spirit of Christmas	Babyface	Arranger, keyboards, programming
2002	Disney's Superstar Hits	Disney	Producer, arranger
2002	Wishes: A Holiday Album	Kenny G	Producer, arranger, keyboards, programming
2002	Only a Woman Like You	Michael Bolton	Producer, arranger, keyboards, programming
2002	Paradise	Kenny G	Producer, arranger, keyboards, programming
2002	A New Day Has Come	Celine Dion	Producer, arranger, keyboards, programming
2002	Shaman	Santana	Producer, composer
2002	Spin	Darren Hayes	Producer, composer, arranger, keyboards, programming
2003	Song of Love	José Cura/Ewa Malas-Godlewska	Composer
2003	Ultimate Kenny G	Kenny G	Producer, arranger, keyboards, programming
2003	SoulO	Nick Lachey	Producer, composer, arranger, keyboards, programming
2003	Closer	Josh Groban	Producer, arranger, keyboards, programming
2004	Como Me Acuerdo	Robi Draco Rosa	Keyboards
2004	Huellas	Myriam Hernández	Producer
2004	This Is My Time	Raven-Symoné	Producer
2004	Walt Disney Records Presents Superstar Hits	Disney	Producer, arranger
2004	Merry Christmas with Love	Clay Aiken	Producer, arranger, keyboards, programming
2004	At Last...The Duets Album	Kenny G	Producer, arranger, keyboards, programming
2004	Mad Love	Robi Draco Rosa	Producer, keyboards, programming
2004	8:09	Joey McIntyre	Strings, Keyboards
2005	Al Natural	Draco	Composer
2005	One Voice	Gladys Knight & the Saints Unified Voice	Composer
2005	Illumination	Earth, Wind & Fire	Producer, arranger
2005	Hurricane Relief: Come Together Now	Various Artists	Producer, composer, arranger, keyboards, programming
2005	Hurricane	Eric Benét	Producer, composer, arranger, keyboards, programming
2005	Heart of America	Michael McDonald/Wynonna Judd/Eric Benét	Producer, composer, keyboards, programming
2006	Gold	Gladys Knight	Composer, Associate Producer, Associate Arranger
2006	Awake	Josh Groban	Piano
2006	Love Songs	Regina Belle	Producer, arranger
2006	I'm in the Mood for Love...The Most Romantic Melodies of All Time	Kenny G	Producer, arranger, keyboards, programming
2006	Aura	Yvonne Catterfeld	Producer, composer, arranger, keyboards, programming
2006	Bianca Ryan	Bianca Ryan	Producer, composer, arranger, keyboards, programming
2007	Spirit	Leona Lewis	Producer, composer, arranger, keyboards, programming
2007	Katharine McPhee	Katharine McPhee	Producer, composer, arranger, keyboards, programming
2007	Gold	Brian McKnight	Producer, composer, arranger, keyboards, programming
2007	Jordin Sparks	Jordin Sparks	Composer, bass
2008	Lovely Way to Spend Christmas	Kristin Chenoweth	Composer
2008	Love Ballads	Kenny G	Composer, Instrumentation
2008	Charlie Brown TV Themes	David Benoit	Keyboards
2008	Three Graces	Three Graces	Producer, keyboards, programming
2008	Identified	Vanessa Hudgens	Piano, composer
2008	Rhythm and Romance	Kenny G	Producer, composer, arranger, keyboards, programming
2008	Rhydian	Rhydian	Producer, composer, arranger, keyboards, programming
2008	A Night to Remember	Johnny Mathis	Producer, composer, arranger, keyboards, programming
2009	Nos Stars Célèbrent le Jazz à Montréal	Various Artists	Arranger
2009	O Fortuna	Rhydian	Composer
2009	Boy Who Knew Too Much	Mika	Composer, keyboards, programming
2009	Uno No Es Uno	Noel Schajris	Producer, composer, arranger, keyboards, programming
2010	Heart and Soul	Kenny G	Producer, composer, arranger, keyboards, programming
2010	It's My Time	Lin Yu-chun	Producer, composer
2011	Roses	Darren Hayes	Producer, Writer
2012	Impressions	Chris Botti	Producer, Writer, Arranger
2012	So Much Stronger	Johnathan Miller	Producer, arranger, keyboards, programming
2013	All That Echoes	Josh Groban	Arranger, Instrumentation
2013	Loved Me Back to Life	Celine Dion	Composer, keyboards
2013	Habítame Siempre	Thalía	Producer, arranger, Instrumentation
2013	Wild Butterfly	Julia Nachalova	
2013	Home For Christmas: The Chris Mann Christmas Special	Chris Mann	Producer
2014	Brazilian Nights	Kenny G	Producer, composer, arranger, keyboards, programming
2014	Getaway	Richard Marx	Producer, composer
2014	Holiday Wishes	Idina Menzel	Producer, Keyboard, Composer
2014	Partners	Barbra Streisand	Producer, arranger, Instrumentation
2016	Encore: Movie Partners Sing Broadway	Barbra Streisand	Producer, arranger, Instrumentation
2016	Sing my Heart Out	Sam Bailey	Composer
2019	I'm Not a Warrior	Sonnet Son	Composer, arranger
2020	Classic Diamonds With London Symphony Orchestra	Neil Diamond	Producer, arranger
2021	Watch What Crappens Tour NYC Town Hall Theater	Ronnie Karam, Ben Mandelker	Producer, Instrumentation

== See also ==
- List of songs written by Walter Afanasieff
