= Chained to You =

2000 single by Savage Garden

Single by Savage Garden

from the album Affirmation
- Released: 18 September 2000
- Genre: Rock
- Length: 4:08
- Label: Roadshow; Warner
- Songwriters: Darren Hayes; Daniel Jones
- Producers: Walter Afanasieff; Darren Hayes; Daniel Jones

Savage Garden singles chronology
"Crash and Burn" (2000)	"Chained to You" (2000)	"Hold Me" (2000)

Audio video
- "Chained to You" on YouTube

"Chained to You" is a song by Australian pop duo Savage Garden, released as the fifth single from their second and final studio album Affirmation (1999). It was released exclusively to Australia and certain parts of Europe.

== Background ==
In a video posted on the band's Facebook page on 20 June 2015, lead singer Darren Hayes explained the story behind the song in that it was about his first experience of a gay kiss. He described it as taking place "in New York City, at a Brooklyn nightclub called Splash." The track makes a reference to Madonna's 1998 single "Ray of Light" and Hayes described "Chained to You" as a 1980s throwback".

This song was one of Savage Garden's few singles that did not make the cut for their greatest hits compilation Truly Madly Completely: The Best of Savage Garden (2005). The live tracks on the CD single were recorded at the Brisbane Entertainment Centre in May 2000. "I Knew I Loved You" differs from the version that appears on the "Affirmation" CD single, in that there is an additional remix section at the end.

== Critical reception ==
Laura Sholedice of Reading Eagle said it was reminiscent of previous songs like "Break Me Shake Me" in her review for Affirmation.

== Chart performance ==
"Chained to You" debuted on the ARIA Singles Chart the week of 8 October 2000 at number 28. The following week, it reached its peak of number 21. It spent 13 weeks in total and became the last of Savage Garden's singles to enter the Australian top 50. "Chained to You" was commercially released in Sweden on May 14, 2001, and was released in other European countries like Turkey, Greece, and Finland. Although the track did not enter any national charts in Europe, it was added to certain radio stations' playlists in Sweden and Estonia in March and April 2001.

== Music video ==
No official video was ever made. The group's performance from their 2001 video Superstars and Cannonballs, taken from the tour of the same name, would later be edited into a music video which aired on certain music networks. During this performance, Hayes came out in a white jacket and pants, a silver shirt, sunglasses, and did his best take of an Elvis impression.

== Track listings ==
All live tracks were recorded at the Brisbane Entertainment Centre in May 2000.

Australian CD single and European maxi-CD single

1. "Chained to You" – 4:08
2. "Affirmation" (live) – 5:44
3. "I Want You" (live) – 3:55
4. "I Knew I Loved You" (live) – 8:23

European CD single

1. "Chained to You" – 4:08
2. "Affirmation" (live) – 5:44

== Credits and personnel ==
Credits and personnel are adapted from the Affirmation album liner notes.

- Darren Hayes – lead and background vocals
- Daniel Jones – keyboards, synthesizers, drum and rhythm programming, electric guitars
- Walter Afanasieff – keyboards, synthesizers, drum and rhythm programming
- Greg Bieck – Macintosh and digital programming
- Michael Landau – electric guitars
- Michael Thompson – electric guitars, Baritone guitar solo
- Dean Parks – acoustic guitars
- Dave Way – mixing at Wallyworld Studios (Marin County, California)
- Jay Healy – vocals engineering at Sony Music Studios (New York City)
- Kent Matcke – track engineering
- David Frazer and David Reitzas – guitar engineering at Wallyworld Studios, Andora Studios, and The Record Plant (Hollywood, California)
- Ethan Schofer – assistant engineering
- Pete Krawioc – assistant engineering
- Luis Quine – assistant engineering
- Dave Ashton – assistant engineering

== Charts ==
Weekly chart performance for "Chained to You"
Chart (2000)	Peak position
Australia (ARIA)	21
