= Heart and Soul (Kenny G composition) =

Single by Kenny G

from the album Heart and Soul
- Released: June 29, 2010
- Genre: Smooth jazz
- Length: 4:35
- Label: Concord Records
- Songwriters: Walter Afanasieff; Kenny G

Kenny G singles chronology
"Fall Again" (2010)	"Heart and Soul" (2010)	"Bossa Réal" (2014)

"Heart and Soul" is a single by American smooth jazz saxophonist Kenny G, from his 2010 studio album Heart and Soul which was released on June 29, 2010.

The track was composed by Walter Afanasieff and Kenny G, as the second single of Heart and Soul. Kenny G plays the saxophone on this track.

== Chart performance ==
The single debuted at Number 23 in the Billboard Jazz Songs chart on July 17, 2010, and peaked at Number One on October 16, 2010.

== Charts ==
Chart (2010)	Peak position
U.S. Billboard Jazz Songs	1
