= Truly Madly Completely: The Best of Savage Garden =

Greatest hits album by Savage Garden
- Released: 28 November 2005
- Recorded: 1995–2005
- Genre: Pop; pop rock; soft rock
- Length: 68:00
- Label: Columbia
- Producer: Charles Fisher; Savage Garden; Walter Afanasieff; Mark Endert; Darren Hayes; Robert Conley

Savage Garden chronology
Affirmation: The B-Sides (2000)	Truly Madly Completely: The Best of Savage Garden (2005)	The Singles (2015)

Singles from Truly Madly Completely: The Best of Savage Garden
- 1. "So Beautiful" Released: 31 October 2005

Truly Madly Completely: The Best of Savage Garden is the first greatest hits album released by Australian pop duo Savage Garden. It was released on 28 November 2005 via Columbia Records. As of August 2006, the album has sold 31,000 copies in the United States.

== Background ==
The album was released worldwide on 28 November 2005, within the exception of the United States, where it was not available until 4 February 2006. The album was released to commemorate Savage Garden's tenth year in the music industry, and their overwhelming success, despite only releasing two albums—Savage Garden and Affirmation. The album was originally planned for release in 2003, containing thirteen of the band's singles, minus "Chained to You", and two bonus tracks—"All Around Me" and "I Don't Care". However, due to contractual issues, the album release was cancelled. In 2005, Hayes and Columbia Records came together to organise a similar release, to be made available in the fourth quarter of 2005. Released on 1 November 2005, the album contains ten of the group's singles, all digitally remastered, in addition to five non-album B-Sides, as well as two new solo tracks from Hayes, "California" and "So Beautiful", the latter of which was released as a single on 31 October 2005, to promote the compilation. The album was made available with four different colour sleeves. A limited-edition version of the album, containing a bonus DVD, was made available in Australia and Japan.

== Track listing ==
All tracks written by Darren Hayes and Daniel Jones except where noted.

Truly Madly Completely: The Best of Savage Garden track listing
No.	Title	Original album	Length
1.	"I Want You"	Savage Garden	3:53
2.	"I Knew I Loved You"	Affirmation	4:11
3.	"To the Moon and Back"	Savage Garden	5:42
4.	"Hold Me"	Affirmation	4:52
5.	"Santa Monica"	Savage Garden	3:36
6.	"Crash and Burn"	Affirmation	4:42
7.	"Break Me Shake Me"	Savage Garden	3:25
8.	"Truly Madly Deeply"	Savage Garden	4:39
9.	"The Animal Song"	Affirmation	4:39
10.	"Affirmation"	Affirmation	4:58
11.	"So Beautiful" ( Darren Hayes; Robert Conley)	Previously unreleased	4:58
12.	"California" ( Hayes; Conley)	Previously unreleased	6:00
13.	"I Don't Care"	B-side to "Affirmation"	5:05
14.	"I'll Bet He Was Cool"	B-side to "Break Me Shake Me"	4:41
15.	"Love Can Move You"	B-side to "Universe"	4:47
16.	"Fire Inside the Man"	B-side to "I Want You"	4:11
17.	"This Side of Me"	B-side to "Universe"	4:11
Total length:			68:00

Deluxe edition bonus DVD
No.	Title	Director	Length
1.	"I Want You"	Nigel Dick
2.	"To the Moon & Back"	Adolfo Doring
3.	"Truly Madly Deeply" (US Version)	Doring
4.	"Break Me, Shake Me"	Doring
5.	"I Knew I Loved You"	Kevin Bray
6.	"Crash and Burn"	Yariv Gaber
7.	"Hold Me"	Alex Keshishian
8.	"Parallel Lines" (Documentary)	Pip Mattiske

== Charts and certifications ==
=== Weekly charts ===
Chart (2005)	Peak position
Australian Albums (ARIA)	11
Danish Albums (Hitlisten)	13
Finnish Albums (Suomen virallinen lista)	32
Irish Albums (IRMA)	21
New Zealand Albums (RMNZ)	15
Swedish Albums (Sverigetopplistan)	31
UK Albums (OCC)	25

=== Year-end charts ===
Chart (2005)	Position
Australian Albums (ARIA)	95
UK Albums (OCC)	140

=== Certifications and sales ===
Region	Certification	Certified units/sales
Australia (ARIA)	Platinum	70,000^{^}
Ireland (IRMA)	Platinum	15,000^{^}
New Zealand (RMNZ)	Platinum	15,000^{^}
United Kingdom (BPI)	Gold	100,000^{^}
^{^} Shipments figures based on certification alone.
