= Jennifer Blakeman =

American musician (born 1963)

- Born: August 6, 1963 (age 63); Louisiana, U.S.
- Genres: Rock, pop, hard rock
- Occupations: Music executive, artist, songwriter
- Instruments: Keyboard, guitar, flute, background vocals
- Years active: 1985–present
- Labels: Warner Bros. Records, Universal Music, BMG

Jennifer Blakeman (born August 6, 1963) is a musician and music industry executive. Blakeman was a keyboardist for multiple bands predominantly in the 1980s and '90s, before starting a career in the music publishing industry.

== Musical career ==
Blakeman started her professional musical career playing in bands around Shreveport, Louisiana while in college, with an eye to pursue a career as a session musician and entertainment attorney. After coming to the attention of Eddie Van Halen who enlisted her to help create a unique signature keyboard sound for him, she spent several years working closely with him programming his keyboards, most notably for the Van Halen OU812 album. As an early member of the band Private Life, a hard rock formation produced by both Ted Templeman and Eddie Van Halen, she co-wrote, recorded and released two albums with this band, Shadows (1988) and Private Life (1990) through Warner Bros. Records. Later Blakeman worked as a touring keyboardist and backing vocalist for British rock artist Billy Idol, the Australian pop rock band Savage Garden (most notably on the Affirmation album), British pop artist Billie Myers, American singer David Cassidy, and many other artists. Her compositions and recordings can be heard in films including Wayne's World, Gremlins and Superstars and Cannonballs.

== Business career ==
Blakeman became an executive at Cherry Entertainment Group, Atlantic Records, Universal Pictures, Universal Music Group, and later Zomba Publishing. After the purchase of Zomba by Universal Music Publishing, Blakeman continued working with the company as the Senior Vice President of Creative Affairs. In this function she was responsible for the publishing of artists including Justin Timberlake, Ne-Yo, Skylar Grey, T-Pain, Anthony Hamilton and Linkin Park. She co-founded Atlas Music Publishing Group where she served as Chief Creative Officer, overseeing a roster of writers whose songs have been recorded by John Legend, Kelly Clarkson, Beyonce, Miley, Sam Hunt, Jay-Z, Kendrick Lamar, SZA, Dr. Dre and hundreds of others. In 2018 she formed one77 Music, a boutique creative-focused music publishing company based in New York City where her clients include Sean "The Pen" Garrett; producers, Mike & Keys; artists Alex Winston and Secret Weapon; the catalog of Al Jackson Jr and joint ventures with Chris Farren's Nashville-based independent publishing company Combustion Music and Atlanta-based Chris Jones of Stateline Entertainment, among others. In 2023 she joined Evan Kidd Bogart's Seeker Music, a multi-faceted entertainment company with label, publishing and management interests, as Chief Rights and Royalties Officer where she oversees the administration of catalogs and clients as varied as Run the Jewels, Christopher Cross, Charlotte Caffey (The GoGos), Joan Jett; writers Sam Watters, Mozella, Soulshock and Carlin, Brian Alexander Morgan and Swizz Beatz as well as classic copyrights performed by the likes of Drake, Miley Cyrus, Beyoncé, 2Pac, Rihanna, Ariana Grande, Khalid, Luke Combs, Whitney Houston, Carrie Underwood, Nas, Sam Hunt, DMX, Blake Shelton, One Direction, Kelly Clarkson, Keith Urban, Gwen Stefani, Pop Smoke, Megan Thee Stallion, and many others.

She has been an adjunct professor of music publishing at New York University since 2006. After serving as president of The Recording Academy's New York chapter board from 2010 to 2012, she was elected to serve four years as trustee on the national board of The Recording Academy, followed by two more years as president of the New York chapter board. She was most recently elected to serve as Secretary/Treasurer of the national board of Trustees for the 2025-27 Term.

== See also ==
- National Academy of Recording Arts and Sciences
- Zomba Group of Companies
- Universal Music Publishing Group
- Seeker Music
- New York University (NYU)
