= Stay the Same =

Stay the Same may refer to:

== Music ==
=== Albums ===
- "Stay the Same" (album), or the title song, an album by Joey McIntyre

=== Songs ===
- Stay the Same (Joey McIntyre song)
- Stay the Same (Gabrielle song), a song by Gabrielle
- "Stay the Same", a song by London-based electronic band autoKratz
- "Stay the Same", a song by Nottingham electronica band Bent, from The Everlasting Blink.
- "Stay the Same", a song by Idlewild from The Remote Part
