= Come Dance with Me (song) =

1959 song by Jimmy Van Heusen and Sammy Cahn

"Come Dance with Me" is a popular song and jazz standard written by 1959 by Jimmy Van Heusen (music) and Sammy Cahn (words) that debuted in 1959 as the title track on Frank Sinatra's album, Come Dance with Me!

== History ==
The song references Terpsichore – one of the nine Greek Muses and the goddess of dance and chorus. The lyrics also mention "Basie Boots," a reference to bandleader Count Basie.

== Selected discography ==
- 1959: Frank Sinatra's album, Come Dance with Me!, featuring Billy May and His Orchestra, Capitol SW-1069 (audio via YouTube)
- 1959: Oscar Peterson and His Trio on the album, A Jazz Portrait of Frank Sinatra, Verve MGV-8334(audio via YouTube)
- 1961: Peggy Lee - for her album Olé ala Lee
- 1998: Barry Manilow, Manilow Sings Sinatra

1999: Shirley Horn The Ultimate Shirley Horn, Verve Records https://www.youtube.com/watch?v=2tUQ1NPprUg&list=RD2tUQ1NPprUg&start_radio=1

- 2006: Joey McIntyre's album, Talk to Me
- 2006: Diana Krall's album, From This Moment On
- 2008: Joey DeFrancesco trio (Jerry Weldon tenor sax), Joey D! (album) HighNote (audio via YouTube)
- 2013: Michael Bublé's album, To Be Loved
