= Hold Me (Savage Garden song) =

2000 single by Savage Garden

Single by Savage Garden

from the album Affirmation
- Released: 13 November 2000
- Length: 4:51 (album version); 3:54 (radio edit)
- Label: Roadshow; Warner; Columbia
- Songwriters: Daniel Jones; Darren Hayes
- Producers: Walter Afanasieff; Daniel Jones; Darren Hayes

Savage Garden singles chronology
"Chained to You" (2000)	"Hold Me" (2000)	"The Best Thing" (2001)

Music video
- "Hold Me" on YouTube

"Hold Me" is a song by Australian musical duo Savage Garden. It was released as the sixth overall single from their second and final studio album, Affirmation (1999). It was initially planned to be released on 8 August 2000 in the United States but was pulled at the last minute, with "Affirmation" being released instead. Therefore, it was first released on 13 November 2000 in the United Kingdom.

"Hold Me" reached number 54 in Australia and became a top-20 hit in New Zealand and the United Kingdom. The music video features Darren walking around Borough Market, and streets in South London, whilst trucks drive in and out of them.

== Song meaning ==
In a video posted on the band's Facebook page on 21 June 2015, singer Darren Hayes explained that "Hold Me" had been written about a marriage breaking down.

== Track listing ==
=== United Kingdom ===
CD1

1. "Hold Me" (radio version) – 3:54
2. "Crash and Burn" (Live in the Studio) – 4:08
3. "Truly Madly Deeply" (Australian version) – 4:38

CD2

1. "Hold Me" (radio version) – 3:54
2. "I Want You" (live acoustic) – 2:48
3. "I Knew I Loved You" (live in Brisbane, May 2000) – 3:26

Cassette

1. "Hold Me" (radio version) – 3:54
2. "Truly Madly Deeply" (Australian version) – 4:38

=== Europe ===
Single CD

1. "Hold Me" (radio version) – 3:54
2. "Truly Madly Deeply" (Australian version) – 4:38

Maxi-CD

1. "Hold Me" (radio version) – 3:54
2. "Truly Madly Deeply" (Australian version) – 4:38
3. "I Want You" (live acoustic) – 2:48
4. "I Knew I Loved You" (live in Brisbane, May 2000) – 3:26

=== Australia ===
1. "Hold Me" – 4:50
2. "Hold Me" (live in Brisbane, May 2000) – 5:10
3. "The Best Thing" (live in Brisbane, May 2000) – 5:29
4. "Affirmation" (Almighty Remix) – 8:04

=== New Zealand ===
1. "Hold Me" (radio version) – 3:54
2. "Crash and Burn" (live in the Studio) – 4:08
3. "I Want You" (live acoustic) – 2:48
4. "I Knew I Loved You" (live in Brisbane, May 2000) – 3:26

== Charts ==
Chart (2000)	Peak position
Australia (ARIA)	54
Canada Adult Contemporary (RPM)	42
Europe (Eurochart Hot 100)	69
Germany (GfK)	79
Ireland (IRMA)	31
Italy (FIMI)	45
New Zealand (Recorded Music NZ)	13
Poland (Polish Airplay Chart)	21
Scottish Singles Sales (Official Charts)	17
UK Singles (Official Charts)	16
UK Airplay (Music Week)	32

== Release history ==
Region	Date	Format(s)	Label(s)	Ref(s).
United States	8 August 2000 (cancelled)	Contemporary hit radio; adult contemporary radio	Columbia	
United Kingdom	13 November 2000	CD; cassette	Columbia	
Australia	15 January 2001	CD	Roadshow; Warner	
