= I Love You Came Too Late =

Single by Joey McIntyre

from the album Stay the Same
- Released: August 17, 1999
- Recorded: 1999
- Genre: Teen pop
- Length: 3:14
- Label: C2
- Songwriter(s): Eric Foster White, Mikey Bassie
- Producer(s): Eric Foster White

Joey McIntyre singles chronology
"Stay the Same" (1999)	"I Love You Came Too Late" (1999)	"I Cried" (2000)

"I Love You Came Too Late" is a song by Joey McIntyre, released as the second single from his debut album, Stay the Same.

== Track listing ==
1. "I Love You Came Too Late"
2. "Stay the Same (Tony Moran Radio Remix)"

== Music video ==
The video features McIntyre in a diner having flashbacks with his ex-girlfriend. He feels depressed during the video and sees his ex with a new boyfriend and looks away. When he leaves, McIntyre then hides from her inside the kitchen while trying to tell her he loves her. After telling her, McIntyre enlightens everyone with some dance. As he dances with her, he notices a ring (engagement or marriage) and feels depressed again. During the video, the girl does not seem to be shocked that she saw McIntyre at all.

== Charts ==
Chart (1999)	Peak position
U.S. Billboard Hot 100	54
U.S. Hot Singles Sales	9
U.S. Top 40 Mainstream	34
