= Meet Joe Mac =

Studio album by Joey McIntyre
- Released: May 15, 2001
- Recorded: 2000–2001
- Studios: Various: The Looking Glass Studios (New York City); The Hit Factory (New York City); Dubway Studios (Manhattan); Wally World Studios (Pittsburgh); Warner Chappell Studios (Los Angeles); Bieck Music Studios (Nashville)
- Genres: Pop; pop rock; dance-pop
- Length: 48:18
- Label: Atlantic
- Producers: Emanuel Kiriakou; Craig Young; Scot Sax

Joey McIntyre chronology
Stay the Same (1999)	Meet Joe Mac (2001)	One Too Many: Live From New York (2002)

Singles from Meet Joe Mac
- 1. "Rain" Released: 2001

Professional ratings
Review scores
Source	Rating
AllMusic	4/5 stars

Meet Joe Mac is Joey McIntyre's second studio album, released on May 15, 2001, by Atlantic Records. The album spawned only one single: "Rain".

== Track listing ==
All songs co-written by Joey McIntyre, except "Love Song".

No.	Title	Writer(s)	Producer(s)	Length
1.	"We Don't Wanna Come Down"	Joey McIntyre; Scot Sax	Mark Plati	4:47
2.	"Rain"	McIntyre; Emanuel Kiriakou	Kiriakou	4:58
3.	"Walkin' My Baby Back Home"	McIntyre; Walter Afanasieff	Greg Bieck	4:27
4.	"NYC Girls"	McIntyre; Kiriakou	Kiriakou	3:50
5.	"Easier"	McIntyre; Kiriakou	Kiriakou	3:45
6.	"Walk Away"	McIntyre; Plati; Mary Laura Wood	Plati	4:21
7.	"National Anthem of Love"	McIntyre; Sax	Plati	3:25
8.	"If I Run Into You"	McIntyre; Sax	McIntyre; Sax	3:03
9.	"Mrs. Callahan"	McIntyre; Kiriakou	Kiriakou	4:35
10.	"Love Song"	Craig Young	Young	3:23
11.	"With a Girl Like You (One Night Stand), Pt.2"	McIntyre; Kiriakou	Kiriakou	4:14
12.	"I Don't Know Why I Love You"	McIntyre; Afanasieff; Sax	Kiriakou	3:30

== Personnel ==
Adapted from the Meet Joe Mac booklet.

Vocals

- Joey McIntyre – lead and background vocals (all tracks)
- Fred Schneider – guest vocals (7)
- Spiro Phanos – additional vocals (4)
- Li'l Al Jacob – additional vocals (4)
- Steffanie Beard – NYC Girl (4)
- Heather Loven – NYC Girl (4)
- Katie Stark – NYC Girl (4)
- Everett Bradley – background vocals (1, 2, 6, 7, 11, 12)
- Tabitha Fair – background vocals (10)
- Skyler Jett – background vocals (3)
- Georgia Jones – background vocals (1)
- Emanuel Kiriakou – background vocals (2, 4, 9, 11, 12)
- John Mandeville – background vocals (10)
- Claytoven Richardson – background vocals (3)
- Mary Wood – background vocals (6)
- Lucy Woodward – background vocals (1, 9, 11, 12)
- Craig Young – background vocals (10)

Instrumentation

- Walter Afanasieff – bass, Hammond B-3 (3)
- Greg Bieck – piano, synthesizers (3)
- Sterling Campbell – drums (1, 6–8)
- John Catchings – cello (10)
- George "Coach" Coccini – guitar (10)
- Chris Collins – guitars (3)
- Charley Drayton – bass (4), drums (2, 4, 5, 9, 11, 12)
- Lisa Kim – violin (2, 5)
- Emanuel Kiriakou – guitars (2, 4, 5, 9, 11, 12), bass (5, 9, 11, 12), Bouzouki (2, 9), percussion (2, 9, 11, 12), piano (9)
- Liz Knowles – fiddle (9)
- Jerry O'Sullivan – uilleann pipes (9)
- Sandra Park – violin (2, 5)
- Doug Petty – keyboards (2, 5, 11, 12)
- Mark Plati – acoustic guitar (8), bass (1, 6–8), keyboards (1, 6, 7)
- Robert Rinehart – viola (2, 5)
- Scot Sax – guitar (1, 8)
- Earl Slick – guitar (1, 7)
- Alan Stepansky – cello (2, 5)
- Michael Urbano – drums (3)
- John Whelm – accordion (9)
- Craig Young – acoustic guitar, bass, distorto slide bass, drums, percussion (10)

Technical

- Greg Bieck – production, arrangement, drum programming (3)
- Emanuel Kiriakou – production, engineering (2, 4, 11, 12)
- Mark Plati – production, engineering, mixing (1, 6, 7)
- Craig Young – production, engineering (10)
- Joey McIntyre – production (8)
- Scot Sax – production (8)
- Pat Thrall – additional production (4, 5), engineering (2, 4, 11, 12), mixing (11, 12)
- Hector Castillo – production assistant (1, 6–8)
- Li'l Al Jacob – production assistant (4, 9)
- David Gleeson – engineering (3)
- John Carter – engineering (8)
- Kevin Killen – engineering (2, 4, 11, 12)
- Michael Ungerer – engineering (2, 11, 12)
- Justin Fraser – additional engineering (9)
- Larry Brooks – assistant engineering (3)
- Peter Krawiec – assistant engineering (3)
- David Reitzas – mixing (3)
- Jean-Marie Horvat – mixing (4)
- Kevin Shirley – mixing (5)
- Neil Dorfsman – mixing (9)
- F. Reid Shippen – mixing (10)
- Rob Worthington – mix assistant (4)
- Greg Calbi – mastering

Imagery

- Goldie Gareza – art direction and design, additional photography
- Jana Leon – photography
- Susan Schacter – additional photography
