= Fall Again =

Song by Michael Jackson

Song by Michael Jackson

from the album The Ultimate Collection
- Released: November 16, 2004
- Recorded: 1999
- Genre: R&B; soul; jazz
- Length: 4:23
- Label: Epic
- Songwriters: Walter Afanasieff; Robin Thicke
- Producers: Walter Afanasieff; Robin Thicke

"Fall Again" is a song written for Michael Jackson by Walter Afanasieff and Robin Thicke with some lyrics written by Jackson. He recorded his demo of the song in 1999. Songwriter Afanasieff confirmed in January 2000, "We worked to the point that we were three-fourths of the way finished, then the incident happened when his son (Prince) got very sick. We’re going to have to reserve a little spot to finish the song." The demo was later released on November 16, 2004, as an album track of Jackson's limited edition box set The Ultimate Collection. In 2010, a version by Kenny G with Robin Thicke on vocals became a hit. The song has been performed by many artists. Jackson recorded a demo of the song in 1999 during the sessions for his album Invincible, but the song was never finished.

== Glenn Lewis version ==
Canadian R&B artist Glenn Lewis recorded the song for Maid in Manhattan, a film released on December 10, 2002 starring Jennifer Lopez and Ralph Fiennes. He makes an appearance in the film performing the song at a charity gala. Soulful and reminiscent of traditional R&B, the song received 5 out of 5 stars on Amazon Music. This version was also featured on a 2003 Universal Music compilation album titled Smooth Jazz Cafe 5.

== Kenny G version ==
American smooth jazz saxophonist Kenny G recorded the song for the album Heart and Soul, which was released on June 29, 2010. Unlike most of Kenny G's jazz numbers, "Fall Again" is an R&B ballad. Kenny G plays the saxophone with Thicke on vocals. Kenny G said, "His (Robin Thicke's) voice is so emotional and soulful, the combination of his voice and my saxophone really hits the perfect tones for my new album." Mark Edward Nero of About.com mentioned Kenny G "is a jazz saxophonist, not an R&B singer. But K.G. has a new, R&B-inspired album", and "Robin Thicke is featured on the first single, 'Fall Again'."

Also released as a single, it debuted at number 30 on the Billboard Jazz Songs chart on June 19, 2010, and peaked at number six on September 11, 2010.

Chart (2010)	Peak position
US Billboard Adult R&B	25
US Billboard Jazz Digital Songs	7
US Billboard Jazz Songs	6
US Bubbling Under R&B/Hip-Hop	5

== Other versions ==
Sagi Rei, an Israel born Italian artist covered this song on his third album SAGI Sings Michael Jackson in 2010.
