= Stay the Same (album) =

Studio album by Joey McIntyre
- Released: March 16, 1999
- Recorded: 1998–1999
- Genre: Pop; R&B; teen pop; dance-pop
- Length: 56:58
- Label: C2; Columbia
- Producer: Joey McIntyre; Donnie Wahlberg; Danny Wood; Walter Afanasieff; Dan Shea; Eric Foster White; Larry Thomas; Raphael Saadiq

Joey McIntyre chronology
Stay the Same (1999)	Meet Joe Mac (2001)

Singles from Stay the Same
- 1. "Stay the Same" Released: February 9, 1999; 2. "I Love You Came Too Late" Released: August 17, 1999; 3. "I Cried" Released: December 1999

Professional ratings
Review scores
Source	Rating
AllMusic	3/5 stars
Robert Christgau	B−
Rolling Stone	2/5 stars

Stay the Same is Joey McIntyre's first solo album, released on March 16, 1999, by Columbia Records and C2 Records. It includes his first single, the title track, "Stay the Same".

== Release ==
The album was released during the late 1990s' teen pop revival, which was mostly dominated by artists like Britney Spears, Christina Aguilera, Backstreet Boys and 'N Sync. The album was able to gain substantial success due to the placement of the single "Stay the Same", which peaked at #10 on the Billboard Hot 100. Fellow New Kids On The Block bandmate Jordan Knight released an album in the same year, with his single "Give It to You" peaking at #10 on the Billboard Hot 100 as well. The album peaked at #49 on the Billboard 200 and was certified Gold by the RIAA.

The second single released, "I Love You Came Too Late", peaked at #53 on the Billboard Hot 100.

== Promotion ==
McIntyre toured with the pop artist Britney Spears in the Disneyland Tour series to promote their albums.

== Track listing ==
No.	Title	Writer(s)	Producer(s)	Length
1.	"Couldn't Stay Away from Your Love"	Joey McIntyre; Joe Carrier	Joe Carrier; Phil Greene^{[a]}	4:43
2.	"I Can't Do It Without You"	McIntyre; Carrier	Carrier; Greene^{[a]}	3:50
3.	"Give It Up"	McIntyre; Donnie Wahlberg; Larry Thomas; Emmanuel LeBlanc; Herb Lane; Keith Crier; Paul Service	Donnie Wahlberg; Larry Thomas^{[b]}; Luis Vega^{[b]}	4:27
4.	"Stay the Same"	McIntyre; Carrier	Carrier; Walter Afanasieff; Dan Shea; Greene^{[a]}	3:48
5.	"I Love You Came Too Late"	Eric Foster White; Mikey Bassie	Eric Foster White	3:14
6.	"All I Wanna Do"	McIntyre; Carrier	Carrier	4:40
7.	"The Way That I Loved You"	McIntyre; Carrier	Carrier; Greene	4:09
8.	"I Cried"	McIntyre	Carrier; Greene	4:39
9.	"Because of You"	McIntyre; Wahlberg; Thomas; Raphael Saadiq	Joey McIntyre; Larry Thomas	5:09
10.	"We Can Get Down"	McIntyre; Wahlberg; Thomas; Dana Farrier	Wahlberg; Thomas^{[b]}; Jovan Taylor^{[b]}	3:58
11.	"Let Me Take You for A Ride"	McIntyre; Danny Wood; Dow Brain; Brad Young	Danny Wood; Dow Brain^{[b]}; Brad Young^{[b]}	3:44
12.	"One Night"	McIntyre; Wood; Brain; Young	Wood; Brain^{[b]}; Young^{[b]}	4:01
13.	"Without Your Love"	McIntyre; Vince Evans	McIntyre; Greene^{[a]}	6:24

Notes

- ^{^[a]} signifies an associate producer
- ^{^[b]} signifies a co-producer
- "Give It Up" contains excerpts from the composition "Disco Nights (Rock-Freak)", written by Keith Crier, Herb Lane, Emanuel LeBlanc, and Paul Service.

== Charts ==
Chart	Peak position
US Billboard 200	49

== Certifications ==
Region	Certification	Certified units/sales
United States (RIAA)	Gold	500,000^{^}
^{^} Shipments figures based on certification alone.
