= Stay the Same (Joey McIntyre song) =

Single by Joey McIntyre

from the album Stay the Same
- B-side: "Couldn't Stay Away from Your Love" (Excerpt); "The Way" (Excerpt); "I Can't Do It Without You" (Excerpt)
- Released: February 9, 1999
- Recorded: 1998
- Genre: Pop; R&B; gospel
- Length: 3:48
- Label: Columbia
- Songwriters: Joey McIntyre; Joseph Carrier
- Producers: Dan Shea; Joe Carrier; Walter Afanasieff

Joey McIntyre singles chronology
"Stay the Same" (1999)	"I Love You Came Too Late" (1999)

"Stay the Same" is the debut solo single by American singer Joey McIntyre, released in February 1999 from his debut solo album, Stay the Same. It peaked at No. 10 on the Billboard Hot 100 and was certified gold by the RIAA. The song is McIntyre's most successful single.

== Music video ==
Directed by Rocky Schenck, the video begins with McIntyre (along with a gospel choir) recording the song in a recording studio. It later cuts to scenes of McIntyre singing on the Belmont Ave. pedestrian bridge over the 101 freeway near Silver Lake and Echo Park in Downtown Los Angeles, in a tree while looking over the said highway and on the roof of a house. McIntyre also sees a birthday being held while singing from afar.

== Track listings ==
European & Australian CD maxi-single

1. "Stay the Same" - 3:48
2. "Stay the Same" (Tony Moran Radio Remix) - 4:39
3. "Stay the Same" (Tony Moran Extended Club Remix)- 9:38
4. "Stay the Same" (Tony Moran Extended Club Remix Instrumental) - 9:41

European CD Single

1. "Stay the Same" - 3:48
2. "Stay the Same" (Tony Moran Radio Remix) - 4:34

US CD & Cassette Single

1. "Stay the Same" - 3:48
2. "Couldn't Stay Away From Your Love" (Excerpt) - 1:12
3. "The Way" (Excerpt) - 1:11
4. "I Can't Do It Without You" (Excerpt) - 1:16

== Charts and certifications ==
=== Weekly charts ===
Chart (1999)	Peak position
Australia (ARIA)	31
Canada (Nielsen SoundScan)	14
Germany (GfK)	63
Spain Airplay (Top 40 Radio)	40
US Billboard Hot 100	10
US Pop Airplay (Billboard)	19

=== End of year charts ===
End of year chart (1999)	Position
U.S. Billboard Hot 100	92

=== Certifications ===
Region	Certification	Certified units/sales
United States (RIAA)	Gold	600,000
