= Heart and Soul (Kenny G album) =

Studio album by Kenny G
- Released: June 29, 2010
- Studio: WallyWorld Studios (Burbank, California); The G House (Malibu, California); Brandon's Way Recording (Los Angeles, California); Sage Sound (Hollywood, California)
- Genre: Smooth jazz, R&B
- Length: 56:24
- Label: Concord
- Producer: Kenny G; Walter Afanasieff; Babyface

Kenny G chronology
Rhythm & Romance (2008)	Heart and Soul (2010)	Namaste (2012)

Singles from Heart and Soul
- 1. "Fall Again" Released: June 2010; 2. "Heart and Soul" Released: July 2010

Professional ratings
Review scores
Source	Rating
Allmusic	3/5 stars

Heart and Soul is the sixteenth studio album by American saxophonist Kenny G. The album was released on June 29, 2010 and produced by Walter Afanasieff. On December 1, 2010, it was nominated for a Grammy Award for Best Pop Instrumental Album.

== Track listing ==
No.	Title	Writer(s)	Length
1.	"Heart and Soul"	Walter Afanasieff, Kenny G	4:35
2.	"Déjà Vu"	Walter Afanasieff, Kenny G	5:00
3.	"Fall Again" (featuring Robin Thicke)	Walter Afanasieff, Robin Thicke	4:14
4.	"Letters from Home"	Walter Afanasieff, Kenny G	3:56
5.	"The Promise"	Walter Afanasieff, Kenny G	5:13
6.	"No Place Like Home" (featuring Babyface)	Kenneth "Babyface" Edmonds	3:56
7.	"My Devotion"	Walter Afanasieff, Kenny G	5:16
8.	"G-Walkin'"	Walter Afanasieff, Kenny G	6:10
9.	"Sunrise"	Walter Afanasieff, Adrian Bradford, Kenny G	5:26
10.	"One Breath"	Walter Afanasieff, Kenny G	3:31
11.	"Encore"	Walter Afanasieff, Kenny G	3:46
12.	"After Hours"	Walter Afanasieff, Kenny G	5:21

== Personnel ==
- Kenny G – soprano saxophone (1–10, 12), saxophone arrangements (5), tenor saxophone (11)
- Walter Afanasieff – keyboard and rhythm programming (1–5, 7–12), saxophone arrangements (5), Hammond B3 organ (11)
- Adrian Bradford – additional keyboards, additional programming
- Babyface – keyboard and rhythm programming (6), bass (6), backing vocals (6)
- Max G – nylon guitar (4)
- John Raymond – guitars (12)
- Julian Bradford – bass (11)
- Jorge Calandrelli – orchestra arrangements and conductor (1, 4, 5, 7, 10)
- Gina Zimmitti – orchestra contractor (1, 4, 5, 7, 10)
- Robin Thicke – lead and backing vocals (3)

== Production ==
- Kenny G – producer and arrangements (1–5, 7–12)
- Walter Afanasieff – producer and arrangements (1–5, 7–12)
- Kenneth "Babyface" Edmunds – producer (6)
- Adrian Bradford – additional production (1–5, 7–12), additional engineer (1–5, 7–12)
- Tyler Gordon – engineer (1–5, 7–10, 12), Pro Tools programming, Logic Pro programming
- Steve Churchyard – orchestra engineer (1, 4, 5, 7, 10) at Capitol Studios (Hollywood, California)
- Paul Boutin – engineer (6)
- David Channing – engineer (11)
- Joe Wohlmuth – Pro Tools engineer (1, 4, 5, 7, 10)
- Mick Guzauski – mixing at The G House Studio
- Steve Shepherd – mix consultant
- Stephen Marcussen – mastering at Marcussen Mastering (Hollywood, California)
- Rich Davis – production coordinator
- Larissa Collins – art direction
- Tommy Steele – design
- Dominick Guillemot – photography
- Mark Adelman – management for Career Artist Management and Front Line Management Group

== Chart performance ==
The album was also commercially successful, which debuted and peaked at number one in the Billboard Jazz Albums chart on July 17, 2010. It debuted and peaked at number thirty-three in the Billboard 200 on July 17, 2010.

The singles released from this album were quite successful in the Billboard Jazz Songs chart in 2010. "Fall Again" peaked at number six, while "Heart and Soul" debuted at number twenty-three, and peaked at number one.

== Charts ==
Chart (2010)	Peak position
Greek Album Charts	24
Polish Album Charts	28
U.S. Billboard 200	33
U.S. Billboard Jazz Albums	1
