= Rhythm & Romance (Kenny G album) =

Studio album by Kenny G
- Released: February 5, 2008
- Studio: Westlake Studios, The Village Recorder and Chalice Recording Studios (Los Angeles, California); Conway Studios and Capitol Studios (Hollywood, California); The G House (Malibu, California); Mamita Estudios (Mexico City, Mexico)
- Genre: Latin jazz, smooth jazz
- Length: 67:05
- Label: Concord Records
- Producer: Kenny G Walter Afanasieff

Kenny G chronology
I'm in the Mood for Love...The Most Romantic Melodies of All Time (2006)	Rhythm & Romance (2008)	Heart & Soul (2010)

Professional ratings
Review scores
Source	Rating
Allmusic	3/5 stars

Rhythm & Romance is the fifteenth studio album (and 1st album under Concord Records) by Kenny G. The first of two bossa nova albums by the artist, the album peaked at number 15 on the R&B/Hip-Hop Albums chart, and number 14 on the Billboard 200. There was a tour supporting the album, called An Evening of Rhythm & Romance.

== Track listing ==
1. "Sax-O-Loco" - 5:13 (Walter Afanasieff, Kenny G)
2. "Ritmo Y Romance (Rhythm & Romance)" - 7:11 (Walter Afanasieff, Kenny G)
3. "Sabor A Mí" - 4:22 (Álvaro Carrillo)
4. "Tango" - 5:27 (Walter Afanasieff, Kenny G)
5. "Mirame Bailar" (featuring: Barbara Muñoz) - 3:51 (Walter Afanasieff, Claudia Brant)
6. "Peruvian Nights" - 6:16 (Walter Afanasieff, Kenny G)
7. "Brasilia" - 6:42 (Walter Afanasieff, Kenny G)
8. "Besame Mucho" - 7:11 (Consuelo Velázquez)
9. "Fiesta Loca" - 4:10 (Walter Afanasieff, Kenny G)
10. "Es Hora De Decir" (featuring: Camila) - 5:18 (Walter Afanasieff, Claudia Brant)
11. "Copa De Amor" - 6:00 (Walter Afanasieff, Kenny G)
12. "Salsa Kenny" - 5:17 (Walter Afanasieff, Kenny G)

== Personnel ==
- Kenny G – soprano saxophone (1–8, 10–12), tenor saxophone (9)
- Walter Afanasieff – acoustic piano (1–9, 11, 12), keyboard and rhythm programming (10)
- Enrique Martinez – accordion (2, 4, 8)
- Tyler Gordon – programming (10)
- Emanuel Kiriakou – programming (10)
- Ramon Stagnero – guitars (1–9, 11, 12)
- Pablo Hurtado – guitars (10)
- John Pena – bass (1, 2, 4, 5, 8, 9, 12)
- Nathan East – bass (3, 6, 7, 11)
- Alex Acuña – drums (1–9, 11, 12)
- Michito Sanchez – percussion (1, 2, 4, 5, 8, 9, 12)
- Ron Powell – percussion (1, 2, 7, 9, 11)
- Rafael Padilla – percussion (2, 3, 8)
- Paulinho da Costa – percussion (3, 6, 7, 11)
- Dan Higgins – saxophones (5)
- Andy Martin – trombone (5)
- Bill Reichenbach Jr. – trombone (5)
- Daniel Fornero – trumpet (5)
- Gary Grant – trumpet (5)
- Jerry Hey – horn arrangements (5)
- Jorge Calandrelli – orchestra arrangements and conductor (2–4, 6–8, 11)
- Gina Zimmitti – orchestra contractor (2–4, 6–8, 11)
- Barbara Muñoz – vocals (5)
- Mario Domm – vocals (10)
- Samo – vocals (10)

== Production ==
- Kenny G – producer, arrangements
- Walter Afanasieff – producer, arrangements
- Chris Brooke – recording (1–4, 6–8, 11, 12)
- Steve Churchyard – recording (1–4, 6–8, 11, 12), orchestra recording (2–4, 6–8, 11)
- Humberto Gatica – mixing, recording (5, 9, 10)
- Valente Torrez – assistant engineer (5, 9)
- Rodolfo Vasquez – vocal recording (5) at Sony BMG Studios (Mexico)
- Gabriel Castañón – assistant vocal engineer (5), assistant engineer (10)
- Tyler Gordon – Pro Tools engineer (10)
- Emanuel Kiriakou – Pro Tools engineer (10)
- Alex Rodriguez – mix assistant
- Stephen Marcussen – mastering at Marcussen Mastering (Hollywood, California)
- Rich Davis – production coordinator
- Charlie G – A&R for Barbara Muñoz
- Matt Taylor – art direction, design
- Michael Muller – photography
- Danielle Decker – grooming
- Emma Trask – stylist
- Karishma Ahluwalia – model
- Jim Morey – management
