= Talk to Me (Joey McIntyre album) =

Studio album by Joey McIntyre
- Released: December 20, 2006
- Genre: Pop standard
- Label: City Light
- Producer: Emanuel Kiriakou, Doug Petty

Joey McIntyre chronology
8:09 (2004)	Talk to Me (2006)	Here We Go Again (2009)

Talk to Me is the fifth solo album by Joey McIntyre, a member of New Kids on the Block. The album consists of cover versions of classic songs previously recorded by Frank Sinatra and other singers. From December 19, 2006, to February 11, 2007, McIntyre went on the 38 city smash hit tour, Dancing with the Stars - The Tour performing "Come Dance With Me" with dancers and "The Way You Look Tonight" with the band. During the eight weeks tour, the album sold 10,000 copies.

== Track listing ==
1. "The Way You Look Tonight" (Dorothy Fields, Jerome Kern: ALDI Music Co.)
2. "I Get a Kick Out of You" (Cole Porter: Warner Chappell Music, Inc.)
3. "My Funny Valentine" (Lorenz Hart, Richard Rodgers: Warner Chappell Music, Inc.)
4. "Bewitched" (Lorenz Hart, Richard Rodgers: Warner Chappell Music, Inc.)
5. "Come Dance with Me" (Sammy Cahn, Jimmy Van Heusen: WB Music Corp., Maraville Music Corp.)
6. "Talk to Me" (Eddie Snyder, S. Kahan, Rudy Vallee: Barton Music Corp.)
7. "Makin' Whoopee" (Walter Donaldson, Gus Kahn: Donaldson Publishing Co,. Keyes Gilbert Music Co., Larry Spier Music LLC, Tobago Music Co.)
8. "Moon River" (Henry Mancini, Johnny Mercer: Famous Music LLC)
9. "Come Rain or Come Shine" (Harold Arlen, Johnny Mercer: Warner Chappell Music Inc., S.A. Music Co.)
10. "I've Got the World on a String" (Harold Arlen, Ted Koehler: S.A. Music Co., BUGHOUSE)
11. "All the Way" (Sammy Cahn, Jimmy Van Heusen: Maraville Music Corp.)

== Personnel ==
- Joey McIntyre: lead vocals
- Doug Petty: piano, organ, accordion, Wurlitzer
- Dan Petty: guitar
- Brian Bromberg: bass guitar
- Vinnie Colaiuta: drums
- Engineered by: Tom McCauley
- Additional engineering: Don Petty
- Pro-Tools digital editing: Pat Thrall, David Channing and Jeff Bova
- Recorded at: B2 STUDIOS, Los Angeles and The Path Studios, Los Angeles
- Mixed by: Bill Schnee
- Assistant mix engineer: Darius Fong
- Mixed at: Schnee Studios, Los Angeles
- Mastered by: Doug Sax and Sangwook Nam at the Mastering Lab, Ojai, California
- Art concept, art direction and photography: Roxann Arwen Mills
- Design: Scott Matz
- Wardrobe stylist: Roman Diaz
