= Superstars and Cannonballs =

Video by Savage Garden
- Released: 12 March 2001
- Genre: Music
- Length: 118 minutes
- Director: Mark Adamson; Pip Mattiske; Kevin Bray; Yariv Garber

Savage Garden chronology
The Story So Far (1999)	Superstars and Cannonballs (2001)

Superstars and Cannonballs is a DVD/VHS released in 2001, after the Superstars & Cannonballs tour in Brisbane by Savage Garden. The release documents the group’s performance during the Affirmation World Tour and includes additional materials such as behind-the-scenes footage, a tour documentary, and selected bonus features. The concert portion presents the duo’s setlist as performed in Brisbane, while the accompanying documentary offers a look at the group’s activities during the tour. The package also contains technical extras, including multi-angle options on selected songs and an audio commentary recorded by the band.

The footage of 11 cameras, eventually lent clips to the music video of the single "Affirmation". The name Superstars and Cannonballs is taken from a part of "The Animal Song" lyrics. The DVD is approximately 110 minutes in duration and includes 3 bonus music videos "I Knew I Loved You", "Crash and Burn" and "Affirmation".

== Critical reception ==
Professional ratings
Review scores
Source	Rating
AllMusic	3/5 stars

In a review published by Le Monde, the DVD was described as an edition with "particularly successful" interactivity, highlighting features such as the animated menu, the documentary, the multi-angle options, and the included music videos. The newspaper noted that the release offered viewers the opportunity to see the Australian duo onstage again, presenting the concert recorded in 2000 in Brisbane during the Affirmation World Tour. According to the review, the material was especially appealing to fans, who could revisit the group’s major hits throughout the performance.

The Herald Sun praised the release, noting the energy of the live performance and highlighting standout moments such as Darren Hayes's interaction with the audience and the inventive staging of several songs. The review also emphasized the added features, including multi-angle options and band commentary, while singling out the Parallel Lives documentary as the most compelling component of the package.

== Track listing ==
1. "The Best Thing"
2. "Break Me Shake Me"
3. "To the Moon and Back"
4. "The Lover After Me"
5. "I Don't Know You Anymore"
6. "Santa Monica"
7. "Two Beds and a Coffee Machine"
8. "You Can Still Be Free"
9. "The Animal Song"
10. "Hold Me"
11. "Gunning Down Romance"
12. "Crash and Burn"
13. "Truly Madly Deeply"
14. "Chained to You"
15. "I Want You"
16. "I Knew I Loved You"
17. "Affirmation"

== Credits ==
- Executive producer: David Wilson (on behalf of Worldstar)
- Director: Mark Adamson
- Producer: Cathie Scott
- Production manager: Sarah Harold
- Audio director: John Simpson
- Director's assistant: Lynda Threlfall
- Documentary produced by: Ephiphany Productions
- Producer/Director: Pip Mattiske
- Production manager: Claire Davidson
- Savage Garden recorded for: JWM Productions (John Woodruff Management)
