= Joey McIntyre =

American singer and actor (born 1972)

- McIntyre in 2026. Image by Claire Edmonds

Background information
- Born: Joseph Mulrey McIntyre; December 31, 1972 (age 53); Boston, Massachusetts, U.S.
- Genres: Pop; swing
- Occupations: Singer; songwriter; actor
- Years active: 1985–present
- Labels: C2; Work; Q; City Light; Atlantic
- Member of: New Kids on the Block
- Formerly of: NKOTBSB
- Website: joeymcintyre.com

Joseph Mulrey McIntyre (born December 31, 1972) is an American singer-songwriter and actor. He is best known as the youngest member of the boy band New Kids on the Block. He has sold over one million records worldwide as a solo artist and worked in film, television, and stage, including performing on Broadway.

== Early life ==
Joey McIntyre was born in Needham, Massachusetts, and raised in the Jamaica Plain neighborhood of Boston, Massachusetts. His parents were Thomas McIntyre, a union official, and his wife Katherine (née Bowen), a community theater actress. His mother died on November 30, 2014, after a long battle with Alzheimer's. His father died on November 12, 2018.

== Artistic career ==
=== New Kids on the Block ===
In 1985, aged 12, McIntyre joined New Kids on the Block, replacing Jamie Kelly. Since the other four members of the band were already long-time school friends, he initially found it difficult to mesh with them. They eventually became one of the most successful boy bands of the late 20th century, producing two number one albums on the US Billboard 200 chart. In 1991, Forbes listed the band as the highest-earning entertainers, beating Madonna and Michael Jackson. They split in 1994, but they reunited in 2008 and have remained active since.

=== Solo career ===
Following their split, McIntyre busied himself with songwriting and sought a solo recording contract. He made his acting debut in the film The Fantasticks, which was based on the long-running Off-Broadway musical. This 1995 film, starring Joel Grey and Jean Louisa Kelly, was released in theatres five years later.

Disenchanted by his inability to find a recording contract, McIntyre used his own money to record his first solo album Stay the Same and sold it on his website. He then chose the album's title track as a single and took it to local Boston DJs, which eventually garnered the song national airplay. The combination of airplay and website sales for the single led to him signing a recording contract in 1999 with Sony Music USA, under the C2 label, a subsidiary of Columbia Records, which had previously been home to New Kids on the Block. The album was re-released on Sony's Work Records and sold more than a million copies around the world and the single "Stay The Same" peaked at No. 10 on the Billboard Hot 100. The second single from the album was "I Love You Came Too Late".

Also in 1999, McIntyre recorded the song "Remember Me" for the film Southie, which starred former bandmate Donnie Wahlberg. In 2001, McIntyre released his second solo album, Meet Joe Mac, but it did not chart. "Rain" was the only single released from this album.

In 2004, McIntyre released his fourth solo album, 8:09, followed by Talk To Me, an album of cover versions, in December 2006.

In April 2008, the New Kids on the Block reunited. The single "Summertime" was released in May 2008. Their first full-length album in fourteen years was released on September 2, 2008, titled The Block. On September 18, 2008, they kicked off their New Kids on the Block Live reunion tour. In 2009, they began their Full Service summer tour. They toured with Backstreet Boys as the supergroup NKOTBSB during the NKOTBSB Tour in 2011 and 2012.

On November 17, 2009, McIntyre released the single and video "Here We Go Again" from his EP of the same name. It was produced by Brent Paschke, Gabe Lopez and Drew Ryan Scott. Paschke, Lopez and Scott also share cowriting with McIntyre on the project. The EP was released on iTunes in December 2009.

In November 2011, McIntyre released a Christmas album titled Come Home for Christmas. The album features a collaboration with fellow New Kid Jordan Knight on "Peace on Earth/Little Drummer Boy" and includes holiday classics such as "Winter Wonderland", "Do You Hear What I Hear?" and "The Christmas Song".

On October 23, 2020, McIntyre returned with the song "Own This Town", his first solo release since 2011's Come Home for Christmas. He said of the song, "I wrote this song years ago, with a totally different intention. To me it’s about taking your shot, swinging for the fences, going for it. And I think it really takes on a new meaning now". This was followed in 2021 by the single "Prolific". It was released the week of his wedding anniversary and dedicated "to all the amazing daughters, sisters and mothers… especially my wife Barrett".

=== Acting ===
McIntyre played Jon in Jonathan Larson's Tick, Tick... BOOM! for both the Off-Broadway (Fall 2001) and national tour (2003) versions of the play. In 2002, he appeared for a season on the television program Boston Public. The following year, he released the live acoustic album One Too Many with Emanuel Kiriakou.

In 2004, he starred in the film Tony n' Tina's Wedding alongside Mila Kunis and also played Fiyero Tigelaar, the leading male role in the Broadway musical Wicked for which he received rave reviews. He replaced Norbert Leo Butz on July 20, 2004, and remained with the show until January 9, 2005, where he was later replaced by David Ayers. He also competed on the first season of the reality television show Dancing with the Stars, placing third with dance professional partner Ashly DelGrosso.

McIntyre appeared as Arthur "Fonzie" Fonzarelli in Happy Days, a musical based on the hit TV show at the Falcon Theater in Los Angeles from February 15 to March 12, 2006, and a second run from June 23 to August 13, 2006. McIntyre appeared in the film On Broadway, which was filmed in his hometown of Boston.

In 2007, McIntyre appeared as Gary in Christmas at Cadillac Jacks. It aired around Christmas of that year on The Hallmark Channel and other various Christian channels and later became available on DVD. On November 2, 2011, McIntyre guest starred on a season 6 episode of the detective comedy Psych, titled "The Amazing Psych-Man & Tap Man, Issue #2".

In 2013, McIntyre appeared in the American buddy cop comedy The Heat, as Peter Mullins, brother of Detective Shannon Mullins, played by Melissa McCarthy. In 2014, McIntyre appeared in the CBS TV sitcom The McCarthys, playing Gerard McCarthy. In 2016, he appeared on the Netflix comedy, Fuller House with all of the members of New Kids on the Block. In 2020, McIntyre appeared in the season 5 series finale of Fuller House, titled "Our Very Last Show, Again", he appeared as himself officiating the triple wedding of the three main couples.

On February 4, 2019, McIntyre returned to Broadway as the character Dr. Jim Pomatter in the musical Waitress and he continued in this role until April 7, 2019.

On March 24, 2022, McIntyre originated the role of Johnny in a new musical production of The Wanderer at the Paper Mill Playhouse in Millburn, New Jersey. He continued in this role for the duration of the show's run until April 28, 2022.

=== Other endeavors ===
In 2001, McIntyre hosted a season of MTV's Say What? Karaoke from Las Vegas, Nevada.

Beginning in December 2006, McIntyre took part in Dancing with the Stars – The Tour with actor Joey Lawrence, pop star Drew Lachey and TV stars Lisa Rinna and her husband Harry Hamlin.

On April 15, 2013, McIntyre competed in the Boston Marathon, in which he ran to raise awareness of Alzheimer's in honor of his mother, who died on November 30, 2014. He finished with a time of 3 hours and 57 minutes, just minutes before a bomb exploded and killed three and injured many more.

On October 24, 2017, McIntyre released the first episode of his podcast "The Move with Joey McIntyre", where he interviews guests about their most memorable moving experience and what was going on in their lives at the time.

On May 5, 2021, McIntyre announced on an Instagram Live Stream, along with Debbie Gibson, the release of the highly expected collaborative single "Lost In Your Eyes, The Duet on June 4, 2021; they also announced a mini residence in Las Vegas, a 4-night limited engagement at the Venetian Resort (August 26, 27, 28 & 29, 2021)

In 2025 Mcintyre released his studio album Freedom, and alongside it a tour. These shows were billed as unplugged, off the grid and intimate. Notably the audience were asked to keep their cameras away apart from during specific songs.

== Personal life ==
McIntyre married wife Barrett Williams, a former real estate agent, on August 9, 2003, in New York City, one year after they met. They have three children, one of whom has congenital hearing loss.

== Discography ==
=== Albums ===
List of albums, with selected chart positions
Title	Album details	Peak chart positions	Certification
Title	Album details	US	Certification
Stay the Same	Released: March 1999; Format: CD; Label: Columbia	49	RIAA: Gold
Meet Joe Mac	Released: May 2001; Format: CD; Label: Atlantic	—	
One Too Many: Live from New York	Released: 2002; Format: CD; Label: Atlantic	—	
8:09	Released: April 2004; Format: CD, digital; Label: Artemis	— (Note: 8:09 peaked at number 50 on the US Independent Chart)	
Talk to Me	Released: December 2006; Format: CD; Label: City Light	—	
Here We Go Again	Released: February 2010; Format: CD, digital; Label: Joey McIntyre	—	
Come Home for Christmas	Released: November 2011; Format: CD, digital; Label: Bowen Arrow	—	
Freedom	Released: January 2025; Format: CD, LP; Label: Joey McIntyre	—	

=== Singles ===
List of singles, with selected chart positions
Title	Year	Chart positions				Certification	Album
Title	Year	US	US Pop	AUS	GER	Certification	Album
"Stay the Same"	1999	10	16	31	63	RIAA: Gold	Stay the Same
"I Love You Came Too Late"	1999	54	28	—	—		Stay the Same
"I Cried"	2000	—	—	—	—		Stay the Same
"Rain"	2001	—	—	—	—		Meet Joe Mac
"L.A. Blue"	2004	—	—	—	—		8:09
"Dance Like That"	2004	—	—	—	—		8:09
"Here We Go Again"	2009	—	—	—	—		Here We Go Again
"O Come All Ye Faithful"	2011	—	—	—	—		Come Home for Christmas
"Own This Town"	2020	—	—	—	—		TBA
"Prolific"	2021	—	—	—	—		TBA
"Lost in Your Eyes" (with Debbie Gibson)	2021	—	—	—	—		TBA

=== Other songs ===
- 2009: "5 Brothers and a Million Sisters"

== Filmography ==
=== Film ===
Year	Title	Role	Notes
2000	The Fantasticks	Matt Hucklebee	
2002	Pillowfighter	Jeremy Yoctin	Short
2004	Tony n' Tina's Wedding	Tony	
2007	On Broadway	Jack O'Toole	
2007	Christmas at Cadillac Jack's	Gary	
2011	New Year's Eve	Rory	
2013	The Heat	Peter Mullins	
2023	Dawn	Michael Sutton	TV movie
2023	Secrets of the Morning	Michael Sutton	TV movie
2023	Twilight's Child	Michael Sutton	TV movie
2023	Midnight Whispers	Michael Sutton	TV movie
2024	Jingle Bell Love	Jack Cooper	
2025	Jingle Bell Wedding	Jack Cooper	

=== Television ===
Year	Title	Role	Notes
1989	The All-New Mickey Mouse Club	Himself	3 episodes
1999	All That	Various	Episode: "Joey McIntyre"
2002–2003	Boston Public	Colin Flynn	Main cast (18 episodes)
2003	Johnny Bravo	Pet Shop Boy (voice)	Episode: "It's Valentine's Day, Johnny Bravo!"
2005	Love, Inc.	Greg	Episode: "Bosom Buddies"
2006	Less Than Perfect	Ethan	Episode: "Flirting with De-Feet"
2011	CSI:NY	Ray James	Episode: "Officer Involved"
2011	Psych	Officer Reynolds	Episode: "The Amazing Psych-Man & Tap Man, Issue #2"
2013	Motive	Glen Martin	Episode: "Creeping Tom"
2013	90210	Rand Gunn	Episode: "#realness"
2013	Newsreaders	Mike Sullivan	Episode: "CCSI: Boston"
2014	The Hot Wives of Orlando	Heath	7 episodes
2014–2015	The McCarthys	Gerard McCarthy	Main cast (16 episodes)
2016	Angel from Hell	Himself	Episode: "Face Your Fears"
2016	Angie Tribeca	Skylar	Episode: "Boyz II Dead"
2016–2020	Fuller House	Himself	2 episodes
2017	Return of the Mac	Joey McIntyre	Main cast (8 episodes)
2018	TMI Hollywood	Himself/Host	Episode: "Joey McIntyre Hosts TMI Hollywood's 2018 Academy Award Show"
2018	Mr. Neighbor's House 2	Game Show Host	TV special
2018–2020	Harvey Girls Forever!	J-Frog/Xaden/Crush 4U (voices)	4 episodes
2022	The Goldbergs	Jean Calabasas	Episode: "The Downtown Boys"
2024	Chicago Fire	Lorenzo	Episode: "Under Pressure"

=== Theater ===
Year	Title	Role	Venue	Ref
1995	Barking Sharks	Eddie Ciolino / Eddie's son	Gloucester Stage Company, Off-Broadway	
2000–2001	Tick, Tick... BOOM!	Jon	Jane Street Theatre, Off-Broadway	
2003	Tick, Tick... BOOM!	Jon	US Tour	
2003	Babes in Arms	Valentine White	Reprise!, Los Angeles	
2004–2005	Wicked	Fiyero Tigelaar	Gershwin Theatre, Broadway	
2006	Happy Days	Arthur "Fonzie" Fonzarelli	Falcon Theatre, Los Angeles	
2013	The Kid	Self (one man show)	Garner Galleria Theater, Denver Centre	
2017	A Funny Thing Happened on the Way to the Forum	Pseudolus	Garry Marshall Theatre, Los Angeles	
2018	Cabaret	Emcee	Atwood Concert Hall, Alaska	
2019	Waitress	Dr. Jim Pomatter	Brooks Atkinson Theatre, Broadway	
2020	Twelfth Night	Orsino	Two River Theater, New Jersey	
2022	The Wanderer	Johnny	Paper Mill Playhouse, New Jersey	
2022–2024	Drag: The Musical	Tom Hutchinson	The Bourbon Room, Los Angeles	
2023	Gutenberg! The Musical!	The Producer	James Earl Jones Theatre, Broadway	
2024	Drag: The Musical	Tom Hutchinson	New World Stages, Off-Broadway	
