= Crash and Burn (Savage Garden song) =

2000 single by Savage Garden

- Australian artwork

Single by Savage Garden

from the album Affirmation
- B-side: "I Knew I Loved You" (remix)
- Released: 13 March 2000
- Length: 4:41 (album version); 3:50 (single version)
- Label: Roadshow Music; Warner Music
- Songwriters: Darren Hayes; Daniel Jones
- Producers: Walter Afanasieff; Daniel Jones; Darren Hayes

Savage Garden singles chronology
"Affirmation" (2000)	"Crash and Burn" (2000)	"Chained to You" (2000)

Music video
- "Crash and Burn" on YouTube

Alternative cover
- International artwork

"Crash and Burn" is a song by Australian pop duo Savage Garden from their second album Affirmation (1999). It was released as the album's fourth overall single, sent to radio in the United States on 13 March 2000; in that region, it was released as the third single. The track received positive reception from music critics, and received the award "Most Performed Australian Work Overseas" at the APRA Music Awards of 2002.

== Content ==
The song's lyrics describe the difficult search for solace and meaningful relationships in a cold world, peaking in a chorus that argues it is fine to "crash and burn" during tough times in order to get over heartache and pain. According to the sheet music published on Musicnotes.com, the track is written in the key of E major, with the vocals ranging from C♯4—B5. In a June 2017 interview, lead singer Darren Hayes named "Crash and Burn" as one of his favourite Savage Garden songs saying, "Musically it’s a dear song to me, because it's all the words I wished someone would have said to me during the period after the first Savage Garden album."

== Critical reception ==
Chuck Taylor of Billboard magazine reviewed the track positively, writing, "Musical maestro and Savage partner Daniel Jones and producer Walter Afanasieff set the instrumental stage with a barrage of gentle keyboards and a persistent but embracing percussive edge against Hayes' emotional vocal." Taylor ended his review with, "Radio shouldn't hesitate to get this one going for the long haul."

== Commercial performance ==
"Crash and Burn" topped the Canadian Adult Contemporary Tracks chart while entering the top 10 in Croatia, the Czech Republic, and on the US Adult Contemporary chart. In the United States, the track hit number 24 on the Billboard Hot 100, becoming their last charting single there to date. Radio made up the entirety of its performance. On the week of its peak on the Hot 100, 27 May 2000, "Crash and Burn" also made its peak at number 26 on the airplay component chart, while it was absent from the one for sales.

== Music video ==
Yariv Garber directed the music video for "Crash and Burn". The video first made its debut on VH1 for the week ending 19 March 2000. It was then added to MTV for the week ending 10 April 2000.

The video is shot in a partially fantastical theme, featuring actress Abigail Culwell watching scenes of troubled young adults interspersed with scenes of the group singing in a warehouse. Messages such as "stay connected" and lyrics from the song, such as "fall apart" appear on the screen. At the end of the video, Hayes uses Auslan to sing the last lyrics of the song.

== Track listings and formats ==
- Australian CD single
1. "Crash and Burn" – 4:41
2. "I Knew I Loved You" (12-inch Mini Me mix) – 8:25
3. "I Knew I Loved You" (club mix) – 6:03
- European CD single
1. "Crash and Burn" (radio edit) – 3:50
2. "I Don't Care" (vocal and drum mix) – 4:10
- European maxi-CD single
1. "Crash and Burn" – 4:41
2. "I Knew I Loved You" (Eddie's Savage Dance mix) – 5:58
3. "Gunning Down Romance" (Drum and Bass mix) – 6:05
4. "I Knew I Loved You" (Eddie's Rhythm radio mix) – 4:24
- UK CD1
1. "Crash and Burn" – 4:41
2. "I Don't Care" (vocal and drum mix) – 4:10
3. "Crash and Burn" (instrumental) – 4:42
- UK CD2
1. "Crash and Burn" (radio edit) – 3:50
2. "Two Beds and a Coffee Machine" (vocal and drum mix) – 3:26
3. "Gunning Down Romance" (drum and bass mix) – 6:05
- UK cassette single
1. "Crash and Burn" (radio edit) – 3:50
2. "Two Beds and a Coffee Machine" – 3:26

== Credits and personnel ==
Credits and personnel are adapted from the Affirmation album liner notes.

- Darren Hayes – writer, co-producer, lead vocals, background vocals
- Daniel Jones – writer, co-producer, keyboards, synthesizers, drum and rhythm programming, electric guitars
- Walter Afanasieff – producer, keyboards, synthesizers, drum and rhythm programming
- Greg Bieck – Macintosh and digital programming
- Michael Thompson – electric guitars
- Dean Parks – acoustic guitars
- Nathan East – bass
- Dave Way – mixing at Wallyworld Studios (Marin County)
- Dave Frazer – vocals engineering at Wallyworld Studios, guitar engineering at Wallyworld Studios and Andora Studios (Hollywood)
- Kent Matcke – track engineering
- Luis Quine – assistant engineering
- Tony Rambo – assistant engineering
- Pete Krawiec – assistant engineering
- Mark Gregory – assistant engineering

== Charts ==
=== Weekly charts ===
Weekly chart performance for "Crash and Burn"
Chart (2000)	Peak position
Australia (ARIA)	16
Belgium (Ultratip Bubbling Under Flanders)	15
Canada Top Singles (RPM)	12
Canada Adult Contemporary (RPM)	1
Croatia (HRT)	3
Czech Republic (IFPI)	8
Europe (Eurochart Hot 100)	53
Germany (GfK)	69
Iceland (Íslenski Listinn Topp 40)	22
Ireland (IRMA)	41
Latvia (Latvijas Top 20)	4
New Zealand (Recorded Music NZ)	19
Scottish Singles Sales (Official Charts)	16
Sweden (Sverigetopplistan)	28
Switzerland (Schweizer Hitparade)	77
UK Singles (Official Charts)	14
UK Airplay (Music Week)	19
US Billboard Hot 100	24
US Adult Contemporary (Billboard)	10
US Adult Pop Airplay (Billboard)	13
US Pop Airplay (Billboard)	14
US Adult Contemporary (Radio & Records)	9
US CHR/Pop (Radio & Records)	12
US Hot AC (Radio & Records)	11
US Pop/Alternative (Radio & Records)	16

=== Year-end charts ===
Year-end chart performance for "Crash and Burn"
Chart (2000)	Position
US Billboard Hot 100	78
US Adult Top 40 (Billboard)	24
US Adult Contemporary (Billboard)	19
US Mainstream Top 40 (Billboard)	53
US Adult Contemporary (Radio & Records)	19
US CHR/Pop (Radio & Records)	57
US Hot AC (Radio & Records)	30

== Certifications and sales ==
Region	Certification	Certified units/sales
Australia (ARIA)	Gold	35,000^{^}
^{^} Shipments figures based on certification alone.

== Release history ==
Region	Date	Format(s)	Label(s)	Ref(s).
United States	13 March 2000	Adult contemporary; hot adult contemporary; modern adult contemporary radio	Columbia	
United States	14 March 2000	Contemporary hit radio	Columbia	
United Kingdom	20 March 2000	CD; cassette	Columbia	
