= Affirmation (Savage Garden album) =

- Australian cover

Studio album by Savage Garden
- Released: 1 November 1999
- Recorded: 1998–1999
- Genre: Soft rock
- Length: 53:42 (International edition); 63:37 (Australian edition)
- Label: Columbia
- Producers: Walter Afanasieff; Darren Hayes; Daniel Jones

Savage Garden chronology
Truly Madly Deeply – Ultra Rare Tracks (1998)	Affirmation (1999)	Truly Madly Completely: The Best of Savage Garden (2005)

Singles from Affirmation
- 1. "The Animal Song" Released: 9 February 1999; 2. "I Knew I Loved You" Released: 20 September 1999; 3. "Affirmation" Released: 10 January 2000; 4. "Crash and Burn" Released: 13 March 2000; 5. "Chained to You" Released: 18 September 2000; 6. "Hold Me" Released: 13 November 2000; 7. "The Best Thing" Released: 12 March 2001

Alternative cover
- International cover

Professional ratings
Review scores
Source	Rating
AllMusic	3/5 stars
Entertainment Weekly	C+
PopMatters	8/10 stars
Q	3/5 stars
Robert Christgau	(choice cut)
Rolling Stone	2.5/5 stars
The Rolling Stone Album Guide	2/5 stars
Sputnikmusic	4/5 stars

Affirmation is the second and final studio album by Australian pop duo Savage Garden, released on 1 November 1999 by Columbia Records. It won the 2000 ARIA Music Award for Highest Selling Album. It was nominated for Best Group and Best Pop Release.

== Background ==
The band recorded their second studio album after they recorded "The Animal Song" for the soundtrack to the film The Other Sister. The majority of the album was written by Hayes in New York in September 1999 or slightly earlier that year. The exception was 'You Can Still Be Free', a much older song that dated back to at least 1995 - a demo recording appeared on their 1995 demo tape, then titled 'Free'. The track was written in tribute to a friend of the band who died by suicide some years previously, and was revisited after said friends' family explained they loved the song and wanted to see it released on an album. Preceded by the second single "I Knew I Loved You", the album was released on 9 November 1999 to worldwide success. The album spawned a further five singles, one of which was exclusive to the Australian market ("Chained to You"), and one of which was exclusive to the British market ("The Best Thing").

Following the success of the Superstars and Cannonballs video album, the album was reissued in November 2000, containing a bonus live album, Declaration, featuring recordings from the concert at the Brisbane Entertainment Centre on 21 May 2000. Including sales of the re-issue, the album has sold more than 8 million copies worldwide, being certified platinum in a number of countries. It became the band's last studio album after Daniel decided to leave in 2001.

Similarly to Savage Garden, the album's track listing varied internationally. The Australian version of the album features a bonus remix of "The Animal Song", a CD-ROM featuring video footage and bonus material, and the uncut version of "Gunning Down Romance". The International version removes the remix, CD-ROM and features a cut version of "Gunning Down Romance", due to a manufacturing error where six seconds of music are cut between 4:36 and 4:42, causing the music to stop abruptly.

== Track listing ==
- All songs written by Darren Hayes and Daniel Jones, and produced by Walter Afanasieff.

Standard edition
No.	Title	Length
1.	"Affirmation"	4:56
2.	"Hold Me"	4:50
3.	"I Knew I Loved You"	4:10
4.	"The Best Thing"	4:19
5.	"Crash and Burn"	4:41
6.	"Chained to You"	4:08
7.	"The Animal Song"	4:39
8.	"The Lover After Me"	4:50
9.	"Two Beds and a Coffee Machine"	3:27
10.	"You Can Still Be Free"	4:18
11.	"Gunning Down Romance"	5:34
12.	"I Don't Know You Anymore"	3:50

Australian special edition
No.	Title	Length
13.	"The Animal Song" (Hex Hector Club Mix)	9:55
14.	"The Animal Song" (Making of the Video)	3:00

Declaration live bonus disc
No.	Title	Length
1.	"The Best Thing"	5:24
2.	"The Lover After Me"	4:38
3.	"I Don't Know You Anymore"	3:37
4.	"Two Beds and a Coffee Machine"	4:46
5.	"You Can Still Be Free"	4:58
6.	"Hold Me"	4:52
7.	"Gunning Down Romance"	6:36
8.	"Crash and Burn"	5:13
9.	"Chained to You"	6:33
10.	"I Knew I Loved You"	8:05
11.	"Affirmation"	6:17

Expanded edition 2015 (Disc 2)
No.	Title	Length
1.	"Hold Me" (live at London Radio)
2.	"Crash & Burn" (live at London Radio)
3.	"I Knew I Loved You" (live at Paris Radio)
4.	"The Lover After Me" (live at Paris Radio)
5.	"I Don't Know You Anymore" (live from The Panel)
6.	"I Knew I Loved You" (Eddie¹s Rhythm Radio Mix)
7.	"Affirmation 2004" (Almighty Mix)
8.	"Chained to You" (Justin Shave Remix)
9.	"Crash & Burn" (Eddie¹s Bumped Up Dance Mix)
10.	"Hold Me 2004" (Almighty Mix)

== Credits ==
=== Savage Garden ===
- Darren Hayes – vocals
- Daniel Jones – additional guitars; keyboards, synthesizers, drum and rhythm programming

=== Additional personnel ===
- Walter Afanasieff – keyboards, synthesizers, drum and rhythm programming, acoustic piano on track 9
- Greg Bieck – keyboards and programming
- Michael Landau – electric guitars
- Michael Thompson – electric guitars and lead baritone guitar on track 6
- Dean Parks – acoustic guitars
- Nathan East – bass
- Steve Smith – drums
- Strings arranged and conducted by Jeremy Lubbock; contractor – Jules Chaikin

=== Production ===
- Arranged and produced by Savage Garden and Walter Afanasieff
- Recorded and engineered by Jay Healy (vocals), Kent Matcke (basic tracking), David Frazer (guitars, strings on track 9), David Reitzas (guitars) and David Gleeson (drums, Fairlight, vocals and piano)
- Assistant engineers – Brian Vibberts, Pete Krawiec, Tony Rambo, Dave Ashton, Ethan Schofer, Dave Ashton, Luis Quine, Mark Gregory, Ryan Hewitt
- Mixed by Dave Way (tracks 1–6 and 8–12) and Chris Lord-Alge (track 7)
- Mastered by Vlado Meller

== Charts ==
=== Weekly charts ===
Chart (1999–2000)	Peak position
Australian Albums (ARIA)	1
Austrian Albums (Ö3 Austria)	26
Belgian Albums (Ultratop Flanders)	43
Canadian Albums (Billboard)	1
Danish Albums (Hitlisten)	3
Dutch Albums (Album Top 100)	46
Estonian Albums (Eesti Top 10)	3
European Albums Chart	9
Finnish Albums (Suomen virallinen lista)	8
French Albums (SNEP)	45
German Albums (Offizielle Top 100)	11
Greek Albums (IFPI Greece)	3
Irish Albums (IRMA)	12
Italian Albums (Musica e dischi)	39
Japanese Albums (Oricon)	12
Malaysian Albums (IFPI)	2
New Zealand Albums (RMNZ)	3
Norwegian Albums (VG-lista)	4
Portuguese Albums (AFP)	8
Scottish Albums (Official Charts)	4
Swedish Albums (Sverigetopplistan)	1
Swiss Albums (Schweizer Hitparade)	8
UK Albums (Official Charts)	7
US Billboard 200	6

=== Year-end charts ===
Chart (1999)	Position
Australian Albums (ARIA)	4
UK Albums (OCC)	89

Chart (2000)	Position
Australian Albums (ARIA)	3
Canadian Albums (Nielsen SoundScan)	41
New Zealand Albums (RMNZ)	39
UK Albums (OCC)	21
US Billboard 200	25

Chart (2001)	Position
Australian Albums (ARIA)	71

=== Decade-end charts ===
Chart (2000–2009)	Position
Australian Albums (ARIA)	46
US Billboard 200	196

== Certifications and sales ==
Region	Certification	Certified units/sales
Australia (ARIA)	8× Platinum	560,000^{^}
Canada (Music Canada)	2× Platinum	200,000^{^}
Denmark (IFPI Danmark)	2× Platinum	100,000^{^}
Finland (Musiikkituottajat)	Gold	31,905
Germany (BVMI)	Gold	150,000^{^}
Indonesia	Platinum	50,000
Italy (FIMI)	Gold	50,000^{*}
Japan (RIAJ)	Gold	100,000^{^}
Malaysia	Platinum	25,000
Mexico (AMPROFON)	Platinum+Gold	225,000^{^}
New Zealand (RMNZ)	2× Platinum	30,000^{^}
Philippines (PARI)	Platinum	40,000^{*}
Portugal (AFP)	Gold	20,000^{^}
Singapore (RIAS)	Platinum	15,000^{*}
South Africa (RISA)	Gold	25,000^{*}
Sweden (GLF)	2× Platinum	160,000^{^}
Taiwan (RIT)	Platinum	50,000^{*}
Thailand	Platinum	40,000
United Kingdom (BPI)	3× Platinum	900,000^{^}
United States (RIAA)	3× Platinum	3,000,000^{^}
Summaries
Europe (IFPI)	Platinum	1,000,000^{*}
^{*} Sales figures based on certification alone.^{^} Shipments figures based on certification alone.
