= Savage Garden =

Australian pop rock duo

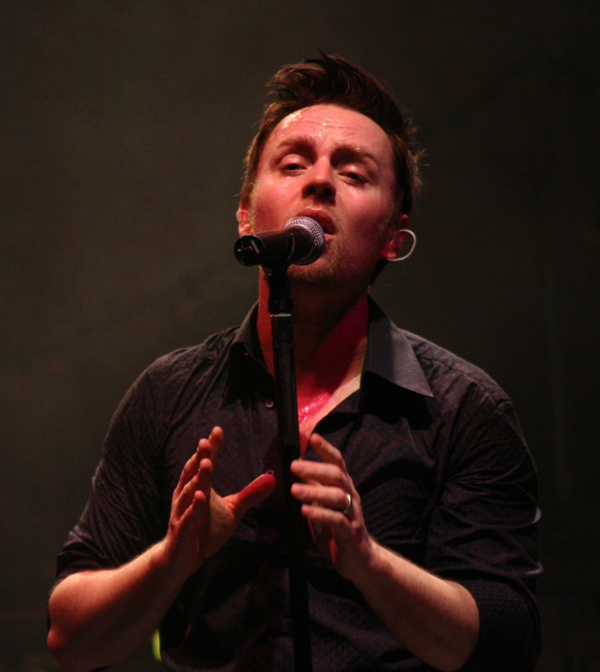
- Darren Hayes (ex-Savage Garden) solo, May 2006

Background information
- Also known as: Crush, Bliss
- Origin: Brisbane, Queensland, Australia
- Genres: Pop; pop rock; soft rock; synth-pop
- Years active: 1993–2001
- Labels: Warner; Roadshow; Sony; Columbia
- Spinoff of: Red Edge
- Past members: Darren Hayes; Daniel Jones
- Website: savagegarden.com

Savage Garden were an Australian pop duo consisting of Darren Hayes on vocals and Daniel Jones on guitar, keyboards, and vocals. Formed in Brisbane, Queensland, in 1993, they were signed to John Woodruff's talent agency and achieved international success with their No. 1 hit singles "I Want You", "To the Moon and Back" (both 1996), "Truly Madly Deeply" (1997), and "I Knew I Loved You" (1999).

The band's two studio albums, Savage Garden (March 1997) and Affirmation (November 1999), reached No. 1 in Australia and Sweden, and the Top 10 in the United Kingdom and United States. These albums sold a total of twenty-three million copies worldwide. The group won a record ten ARIA Music Awards in 1997 for their debut album and its related singles. They disbanded at the end of 2001, with Hayes continuing as a solo artist and Jones moving into record production before becoming a real estate agent.

== History ==
=== 1993–1995: Formation ===
Savage Garden were a spin-off from Red Edge, which had formed in Brisbane as a cover band in 1992 by Daniel Jones on keyboards and rhythm guitar, his brother Oliver Jones on lead guitar and lead vocals, Jamie Sullivan on bass guitar and backing vocals, and his brother Scott Sullivan on drums. In mid-1993 Daniel Jones placed an ad in the Brisbane street publication Time Off seeking a vocalist for the group. Darren Hayes, who was studying at university and working as a record sales assistant, joined after his audition. Hayes' first performance with Red Edge was in front of an audience of four in Toowoomba. Their set included the group's renditions of "Hurts So Good" (originally by John Cougar, 1982), "Let's Stick Together" (in the style of Bryan Ferry, 1976), "Khe Sanh" (Cold Chisel, 1978) and "Don't Change" (INXS, 1982). The five-piece version of Red Edge played pubs and clubs from southern Queensland to northern New South Wales, while Hayes and Jones started to write original material.

In June 1994, Hayes and Jones left the group to work as a duo, originally as Crush. By year's end, the pair had enough songs for a five-song demo tape under the name Bliss. They sent 150 copies to various record companies around the world. They were renamed Savage Garden after a phrase from The Vampire Chronicles by Anne Rice: "Beauty was a Savage Garden". John Woodruff (The Angels, Baby Animals, Diesel) provided a positive response; he became their talent manager and negotiated a contract with Roadshow Music/Warner Music. In 1995 they entered the studio to work on their debut album with producer Charles Fisher (Air Supply, Moving Pictures, 1927). Woodruff financed the recordings by drawing on his home's mortgage and taking loans in exchange for also becoming the group's record label representative and their music publisher.

=== 1996–1998: Debut album ===
In May 1996, Savage Garden released their debut single "I Want You" under Roadshow Music. It peaked at No. 4 on the Australian Recording Industry Association (ARIA) singles chart, while on the 1996 End of Year Singles Chart it was highest placed by an Australian artist at No. 12. On 30 September of that year they received their first ARIA award nomination, in the category Breakthrough Artist – Single, for "I Want You". The duo attended the ceremony and presented an award. Their local success drew interest from international labels and they were signed for overseas releases with Columbia Records in late November. The label's executives had Woodruff arrange for Hayes and Jones to reside in a Kings Cross hotel for 8 months, where they wrote songs for a debut album to be released in 1997. Each day the duo and Woodruff would travel to Fisher's home to plan their work. In November 1996 a second single, "To the Moon and Back", was released and reached No. 1 in January 1997 in Australia.

"I Want You" was released in North America in February 1997, where it peaked at No. 4 on the United States Billboard Hot 100 and by April had achieved gold status according to Recording Industry Association of America (RIAA). It became their first number-one hit, reaching that spot on RPM's Top 100 Singles chart in Canada in June 1997. "Truly Madly Deeply", the band's third Australian single, was released in March, which also reached No. 1 and became their signature song. Later that month, the duo's debut album, Savage Garden, entered the Australian charts at No. 1 and peaked there for a total of nineteen non-consecutive weeks.

The album was released internationally on 24 March. "I Want You" was issued across Europe in April and reached No. 11 on the United Kingdom Singles Chart, top 20 in France, New Zealand and Sweden. At the end of May, "To the Moon and Back" was the most played song on radio in the United States. In June, a fourth single, "Break Me Shake Me", was released in Australia as the album reached No. 3 on the US Billboard 200 and was certified gold by RIAA. According to rock music historian Ian McFarlane, "[It] revealed the influence of 1980s UK pop on Hayes and Jones' songwriting. Tears for Fears and Roxette melodies blended seamlessly with Eurythmics-like arrangements, while Cure-styled guitar provided the icing on the cake."

Savage Garden won a record of ten ARIA Awards in September 1997: Best Pop Release and Song of the Year for "To the Moon and Back" and Single of the Year and Highest Selling Single for "Truly Madly Deeply", Best Independent Release, Breakthrough Artist – Album, Album of the Year and Best Group for Savage Garden, Producer of the Year and Engineer of the Year for Fisher's work on that album. They followed with their fifth Australian single, "Universe" in November. "Truly Madly Deeply" became their third single in the US and replaced Elton John's "Candle in the Wind 1997", after its fourteen-week run at No. 1.

In January 1998, "All Around Me" was released as a radio-only single in Australia. 3,000 give-away copies were available at their second Brisbane concert. By the end of that year, "Truly Madly Deeply" was the most played song on US radio and became the only one-sided single to spend a year in the top 30 of the Billboard Hot 100. In November, "Santa Monica"—their final single from the album—was released exclusively in Japan, accompanied by a video of a live performance at the Hard Rock Cafe. As of 2005 Savage Garden had been certified 12× platinum in Australia, 7× platinum in the US, 3× platinum in Canada, 2× platinum in New Zealand, Singapore, and the UK.

=== 1999–2000: Affirmation ===
Savage Garden's second album, Affirmation, was issued in November 1999. It was produced by Walter Afanasieff (Ricky Martin, Mariah Carey, Céline Dion). According to Australian music journalist Ed Nimmervoll, it was "basically written by phone and computer from their separate corners of the world" with Hayes in New York and Jones in Brisbane. The lead single, "The Animal Song", appeared in February of that year, which was used in the romantic comedy film The Other Sister (1999); it became a No. 3 hit in Australia and Top 20 in the UK and US.

In September, they released Affirmation's third single "I Knew I Loved You", which peaked at No. 4 in Australia and No. 10 in the UK. It peaked at No. 1 in Australia and later achieved 8× platinum. Within a month, it went platinum in the US, partly due to the single "I Knew I Loved You", which hit No. 1 on the Hot 100, also going platinum, and becoming the most-played single on US radio for the year. That track also reached No. 1 in Canada.

Affirmation displayed the development of Savage Garden's sound—it was mainstream pop leaning towards adult contemporary music. It was described by McFarlane as "pure unadulterated pop, boasting enticing melodies and a classy and sleek production sound." In February 2000, as "Crash and Burn" became its fifth single, their song "Truly Madly Deeply" was still on the Monitor/Billboard Adult Contemporary Airplay Chart, breaking the record for length of time on that chart and finally dropped off after 123 weeks, while "Crash and Burn" peaked at No. 10.

In June 2000, Hayes performed "'O Sole Mio" at a benefit concert for Luciano Pavarotti's annual Pavarotti and Friends. Savage Garden's success was reflected at the Billboard Music Awards, where they won Best Adult Contemporary Video and No. 1 Adult Contemporary Song of the Year, for "I Knew I Loved You", and No. 1 Adult Contemporary Artist of the Year. "I Knew I Loved You" stayed on the Monitor/Billboard Adult Contemporary Airplay Chart for 124 weeks. Savage Garden performed the title track at the 2000 Summer Olympics closing ceremony in October.

=== 2001: Split ===
At the end of 2001, there was media speculation that the band would break up due to Hayes starting his solo album project. He announced that Jones was taking time off to work on a record label that he had founded. The band took a hiatus but was expected to reform by early 2002. However, in October 2001, Hayes announced that Savage Garden had broken up. Hayes and Jones had agreed that they would break up after finishing their tour for their second album. After the announcement, the band's website posted a statement:

We are extremely grateful to our fans all around the world for their incredible support over the years. The success of Savage Garden and our time together has been an amazing experience... one that we will never forget. We just hope that you all understand our individual needs to continue growing.

In an interview on the musicMAX network, Hayes said that a few weeks before the release of their second album, Jones did not like the fame that the band was receiving and was not happy. Hayes wanted to move on in the music industry as a solo artist. His first solo single, "Insatiable", was released in January 2002 and his solo album, Spin, followed in March. It spawned several UK Top 40 singles, including "I Miss You", "Strange Relationship", and "Crush (1980 Me)". Hayes went on to release a further four studio albums: 2004's The Tension and the Spark, 2007's This Delicate Thing We've Made, 2011's Secret Codes and Battleships, and 2022's Homosexual, the latter three studio albums releasing on Hayes' own record label, Powdered Sugar.

Jones started his own production company, Meridien Musik, and built a recording studio, Level 7 Studios, to record young Australian artists including Aneiki and Bachelor Girl.

In August 2007, Hayes was asked by The Daily Telegraph if he and Jones would ever consider a reunion. He replied abruptly, "No, never. I once said I'd only do it if it cured cancer, and that's still how I feel."

=== 2005: Truly Madly Completely ===
The greatest hits package Truly Madly Completely: The Best of Savage Garden was released on 7 November 2005—with a US release following in early 2006—and included a single by Darren Hayes titled "So Beautiful". Several variations of the release also included a bonus DVD featuring several music video clips, as well as the Parallel Lives documentary, which was earlier released as a bonus feature of the Superstars and Cannonballs DVD/VHS.

=== 2015: Savage Garden: The Singles ===
To celebrate the 20th anniversary of the band's formation, a new compilation titled Savage Garden: The Singles was released on 12 June, and features a previously unheard demo from 1994, titled "She". Hayes said of the recording; "It's a long time ago, but my recollection is I was writing about the relationship that I have, and continue to have, with the women in my life. From my sister to my mother and all the friends and the wonderful female relationships in my life. I know I'm indebted to these incredibly strong women who loved me and taught me what it was like to be strong and succeed in a world where you sometimes feel underestimated." The album also includes a bonus DVD of Australian and international music video releases. It accompanies a major re-release of their two studio albums with bonus tracks and live performances, the first time their catalogue has received such treatment.

== Tours ==
=== The Future of Earthly Delites ===
The Future of Earthly Delites Tour was called the To the Moon and Back Tour in the US. Some footage from this tour can be seen in the international music video for "Break Me Shake Me", as well as the music video for "Tears of Pearls".

=== Affirmation World Tour ===
The Affirmation World Tour (2000), played 80 shows across Australasia, Europe, and North America. The show was the beginning of Hayes' collaboration with Willie Williams, having a stage set consisting of a game-show-like backdrop of multicoloured neon lights. The international music video for the song "Affirmation", as well as the music videos for "Chained to You" and "The Best Thing", were filmed during this tour. During the Australian leg, a camera crew filmed both on-stage and backstage, the footage of which was issued as the Superstars and Cannonballs video album in March 2001.

== Discography ==
- Savage Garden (1997)
- Affirmation (1999)

== Awards and nominations ==
In 2009, as part of the Q150 celebrations, Savage Garden was announced as one of the Q150 Icons of Queensland for its role as an "Influential Artists". In December 2020, Savage Garden was listed at number 28 in Rolling Stone Australia's "50 Greatest Australian Artists of All Time" issue.
