= Affirmation (Savage Garden song) =

2000 single by Savage Garden

Single by Savage Garden

from the album Affirmation
- Released: 10 January 2000
- Length: 4:15
- Label: Roadshow Music; Warner Music Australia
- Songwriters: Daniel Jones; Darren Hayes
- Producers: Walter Afanasieff; Daniel Jones; Darren Hayes

Savage Garden singles chronology
"I Knew I Loved You" (1999)	"Affirmation" (2000)	"Crash and Burn" (2000)

Music video
- "Affirmation" on YouTube

"Affirmation" is a song by Savage Garden, released as the third single from their second and final studio album of the same name (1999). It peaked at number 16 in Australia and number eight on the UK Singles Chart.

== Background ==
The lyrics are a series of statements each starting with "I believe", for instance: "I believe in Karma, what you give is what you get returned" and "I believe you can't appreciate real love until you've been burned". The song was performed live at the Sydney Olympic Games Closing Ceremony in October 2000, with Darren wearing a T-shirt depicting the Aboriginal flag.

The European music video is a collection of clips from the group's tour of Brisbane, entitled Superstars and Cannonballs. The original Australian version of the music video comprises various pictures and footage from history throughout the 20th century. The single was most successful in the United Kingdom where it reached number eight, becoming the duo's fourth Top 10 hit.

== Track listings ==
All live tracks were recorded at the Brisbane Entertainment Centre in May 2000.

- Australian CD single
1. "Affirmation"
2. "I Don't Care"
3. "Affirmation" (Stop Beats mix)
4. "I Knew I Loved You" (crossover mix)
- UK CD1
1. "Affirmation" (radio version) – 4:15
2. "Affirmation" (Almighty remix)
3. "Crash & Burn" (Eddie's crossover mix) – 3:40
- UK CD2
1. "Affirmation" (live) – 5:46
2. "Truly Madly Deeply" (live) – 4:37
3. "I Knew I Loved You" (live) – 4:56
- UK cassette single
1. "Affirmation" – 4:54
2. "Truly Madly Deeply" (live) – 4:37
- European CD single
1. "Affirmation" (radio version) – 4:15
2. "Affirmation" (Stop Beats mix) – 4:15
- European maxi-CD single
1. "Affirmation" (radio version) – 4:15
2. "Affirmation" (Stop Beats mix) – 4:15
3. "I Knew I Loved You" (Eddie's savage dance mix) – 5:58
4. "Two Beds and a Coffee Machine" (piano and vocal mix) – 3:25
- Japanese CD single
1. "Affirmation" (groovy mix)
2. "I Knew I Loved You" (Mini-Me mix)
3. "I Knew I Loved You" (Eddie's rhythm radio mix)
4. "Two Beds and a Coffee Machine" (piano and vocal)
5. "I Don't Care" (original version)

== Charts ==
=== Weekly charts ===
Chart (2000)	Peak position
Australia (ARIA)	16
Canada Top Singles (RPM)	36 (Note: "Affirmation" reached number 36 when RPM ceased publication in November 2000.)
Czech Republic (IFPI)	11
Estonia (Eesti Top 20)	7
Europe (Eurochart Hot 100)	34
Germany (GfK)	64
Ireland (IRMA)	23
Italy (FIMI)	24
Italy (Musica e dischi)	42
Latvia (Latvijas Top 30)	15
New Zealand (Recorded Music NZ)	29
Scottish Singles Sales (Official Charts)	8
Singapore (SPVA)	2
Sweden (Sverigetopplistan)	26
UK Singles (Official Charts)	8
UK Airplay (Music Week)	25
US CHR/Pop Top 50 (Radio & Records)	37

=== Year-end charts ===
Chart (2000)	Position
Australia (ARIA)	95
UK Singles (OCC)	161

== Certifications ==
Region	Certification	Certified units/sales
Australia (ARIA)	Gold	35,000^{^}
United Kingdom (BPI)	Silver	200,000^{‡}
^{^} Shipments figures based on certification alone.^{‡} Sales+streaming figures based on certification alone.

== Release history ==
Region	Date	Format(s)	Label(s)	Ref(s).
Australia	10 January 2000	CD	Roadshow Music; Warner Music Australia	
Japan	29 March 2000	CD	SME	
United Kingdom	17 July 2000	CD; cassette	Columbia	
United States	28 August 2000	Adult contemporary; hot adult contemporary; modern adult contemporary radio	Columbia	
United States	29 August 2000	Contemporary hit radio	Columbia	
