= Walter Afanasieff =

American musician (born 1958)

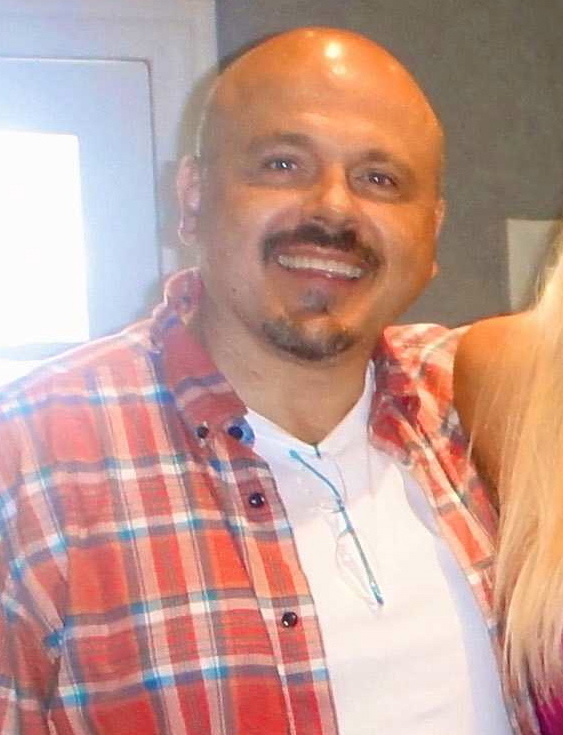
- Afanasieff in 2011

Background information
- Born: Vladimir Nikitich Afanasiev; February 10, 1958 (age 68); São Paulo, Brazil
- Origin: United States
- Genres: Soul; rhythm and blues; pop; pop rock; classical; Latin
- Occupations: Record producer; songwriter; composer; arranger; musician
- Instrument: Keyboards
- Works: Full discography; songs written
- Years active: 1980–present
- Labels: Walter Afanasieff Production Co.; Wallyworld; Sony

Walter Afanasieff (born Vladimir Nikitich Afanasiev; Russian: Владимир Никитич Афанасьев, February 10, 1958), formerly nicknamed Baby Love in the 1980s, is an American record producer and songwriter. He was a frequent collaborator of Mariah Carey on her first six studio albums. Afanasieff and Carey co-wrote many songs together, including the number-one singles "Hero", "All I Want for Christmas Is You", "One Sweet Day", and "My All". He won the 1999 Grammy Award in the Record of the Year category for producing "My Heart Will Go On" by Celine Dion, and the 2000 Grammy Award for Producer of the Year, Non-Classical.

== Early life ==
Afanasieff was born in São Paulo, Brazil. His father was Russian, while his mother, who was from Harbin, China, was of Russian-Chinese descent. When Afanasieff was four or five, his family moved to the United States. He received his education from Conservatory of Music in San Mateo.

== Career ==
Starting out as a working jazz musician in 1980, Afanasieff initially played keyboards with the jazz/fusion violinist Jean-Luc Ponty. Later, he formed The Warriors with another former Ponty sideman, guitarist Joaquin Lievano, and with 1980s music producer/songwriter and drummer Narada Michael Walden, and these experiences gave him the background and confidence to take an active role as a producer.

Walden hired Afanasieff as a staff producer/arranger and began using him as a keyboardist on Whitney Houston's self-titled debut album released in 1985, which went on to become the artist's best-selling studio album to date. It was also during this time that Afanasieff and Walden began writing pop songs together. Together with his mentor Narada, Afanasieff's first major production was the title track of the James Bond movie Licence to Kill, sung by Gladys Knight and co-written by Afanasieff and Walden.

One of Afanasieff's biggest hits as a producer was "My Heart Will Go On", the theme tune to the 1997 film Titanic, sung by Celine Dion. The song became the world's best-selling single of 1998. Afanasieff produced and arranged other motion picture soundtracks, including Disney's Beauty and the Beast (the Celine Dion/Peabo Bryson title-track duet), Aladdin ("A Whole New World") and The Hunchback of Notre Dame ("Someday"). Afanasieff was also the producer and arranger for "Go the Distance", the Oscar-nominated Michael Bolton song from the animated film Hercules.

Afanasieff performs on most of his recordings (mainly keyboards, synthesizers and drum programming).

Afanasieff created music with Mariah Carey from 1990 to 2001. He had a role in some of Carey's most successful songs, including "Hero", which he co-produced, co-wrote, and on which he played all of the music tracks. "Hero" was released as the second single from Carey's album Music Box, and reached number one on the Billboard Hot 100 chart on December 25, 1993. It remained at the top of the chart for four weeks. "Hero" has become one of Carey's signature songs, and Carey closes many of her concerts with it. Carey and Afanasieff also wrote "One Sweet Day", a duet between Carey and Boyz II Men, which held the record for the longest run at number 1 on the Billboard Hot 100 (16 weeks) for 23 years; the record was matched in 2017 by "Despacito", and broken by "Old Town Road" in 2019. The song was nominated for the 1996 Grammy Awards for Record of the Year and Best Pop Collaboration with Vocals, and received the American Society of Composers, Authors and Publishers Song of the Year Award for 1996. In 1994, Carey released the Christmas song "All I Want for Christmas Is You", composed by Afanasieff and herself. As of June 2022, the song has earned cumulative worldwide sales of over 16 million copies. In 2009, Afanasieff started working with Russian singer Yulia Nachalova. Their album Wild Butterfly was released in 2012 on iTunes. They later produced a video "Zhdi menya" ("Wait for Me") in Russian, released on iTunes in 2015.

In 2014, Afanasieff became head of the composers/producers department at Isina, a worldwide talent search and development mentorship for those seeking to pursue a career in music.

In 2015, he became one of the mentors of the Russian TV project Glavnaya Stsena ("Main Stage"), the Russian version of The X Factor.

== Personal life ==
Afanasieff married TV personality and entrepreneur Katie Cazorla in 2017. They own the Kookaburra Lounge Comedy and Music Club in Hollywood, California.

== Awards ==
- 1999 Grammy Award in the Record of the Year category for producing "My Heart Will Go On" by Celine Dion
- 2000 Grammy Award in the Producer of the Year, Non-Classical category
