= Kenny G discography =

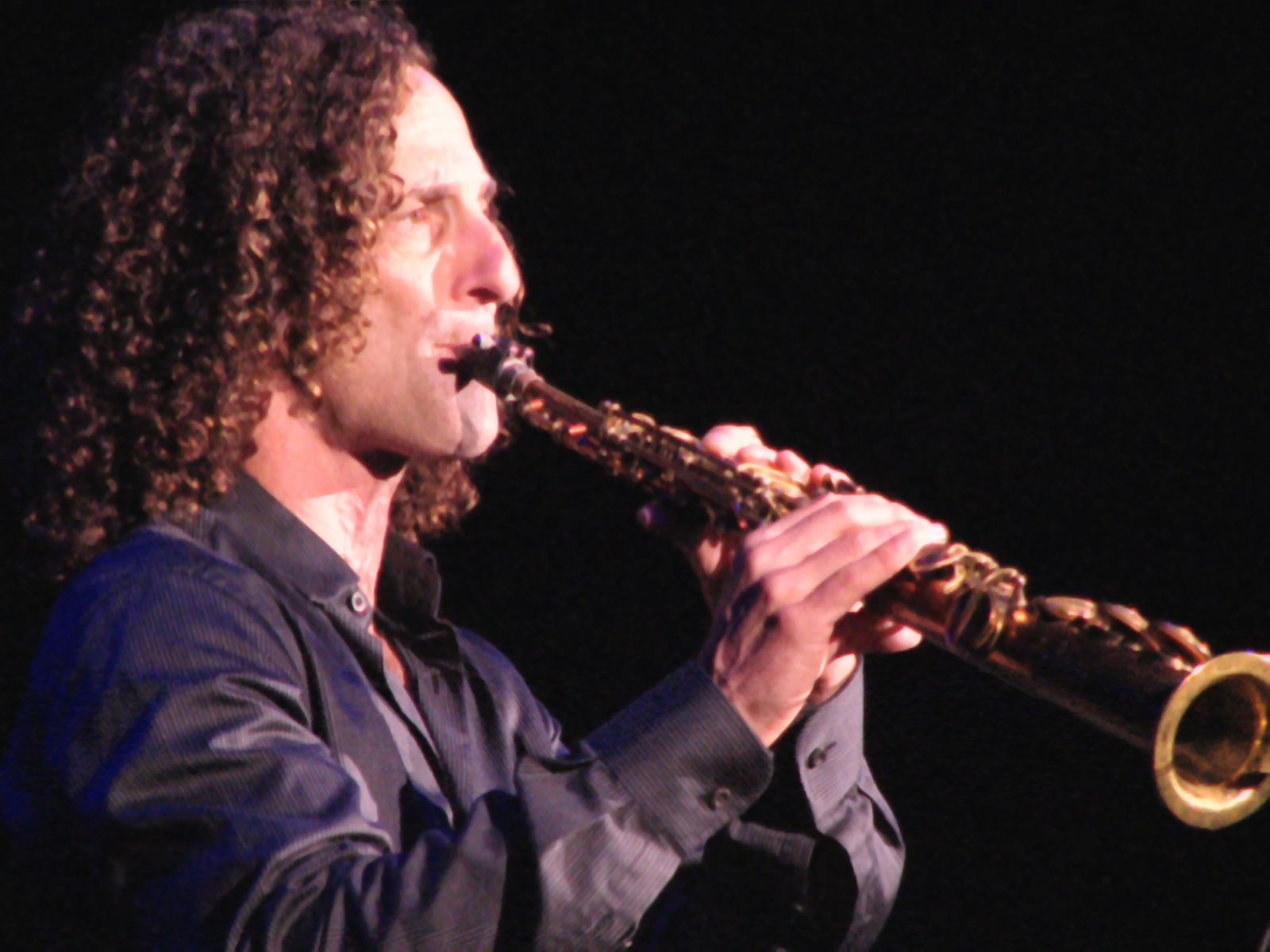
- Studio albums: 16
- Extended plays: 1
- Live albums: 3
- Compilation albums: 18
- Singles: 41
- Music videos: 18

American saxophonist Kenny G has released fifteen studio albums, eighteen compilation albums, and forty-one singles. He released his self-titled debut album on Arista Records in 1982 and remained with that label until 2006. All subsequent releases have been through Concord Records.

Kenny G has eleven solo entries and four collaborative entries on the Billboard Hot 100 singles charts. Of these, his highest peak is the instrumental "Songbird", which reached number four in 1987. In addition to these, Kenny G holds a large number of credits as a collaborator on other artists' works.

== Albums ==
=== Studio albums ===
Album details	Chart positions							Certifications (sales thresholds)
Album details	US	US R&B	US Jazz	AUS	NLD	NZ	UK	Certifications (sales thresholds)
Kenny G: Released: August 1, 1982; Label: Arista	—	—	10	—	—	—	—	US: Gold
G Force: Released: December 19, 1983; Label: Arista	62	17	6	—	—	—	56	US: Platinum
Gravity: Released: April 29, 1985; Label: Arista	97	37	13	—	—	—	—	US: Platinum
Duotones: Released: September 29, 1986; Label: Arista	6	8	5	28	23	20	28	US: 5× Platinum
Silhouette: Released: October 4, 1988; Label: Arista	8	10	1^{[A]}	—	—	—	—	US: 4× Platinum
Breathless: Released: October 20, 1992; Label: Arista	2	2	1^{[A]}	1	11	1	4	US: Diamond (12× Platinum); AUS: 3× Platinum; UK: Gold
Miracles: The Holiday Album: Released: November 1, 1994; Label: Arista	1	1	1	19	—	16	85	US: 8× Platinum; AUS: Gold
The Moment: Released: October 1, 1996; Label: Arista	2	9	1^{[A]}	21	50	15	19	US: 4× Platinum; AUS: Gold; UK: Gold
Classics in the Key of G: Released: June 28, 1999; Label: Arista	17	27	1^{[A]}	34	—	6	—	US: Platinum
Faith: A Holiday Album: Released: November 16, 1999; Label: Arista	6	4	1	189	—	—	—	US: 3× Platinum
Paradise: Released: September 10, 2002; Label: Arista	9	15	2^{[A]}	—	—	—	—	US: Gold
Wishes: A Holiday Album: Released: October 22, 2002; Label: Arista	29	34	2	—	—	—	—	US: Gold
At Last...The Duets Album: Released: November 23, 2004; Label: Arista	40	21	1	146	—	—	—	US: Gold
I'm in the Mood for Love...The Most Romantic Melodies of All Time: Released: November 14, 2006; Label: Arista	37	22	1	145	—	—	—	
Rhythm and Romance: Released: February 5, 2008; Label: Starbucks Entertainment / Concord	14	15	—	—	—	—	—	
Heart and Soul: Released: June 29, 2010; Label: Concord	33	—	1	—	—	—	—	
Namaste (with Rahul Sharma): Released: June 26, 2012; Label: Concord	—	—	8	—	—	—	—	
Brazilian Nights: Released: January 27, 2015; Label: Concord	86	—	1	—	—	—	—	
New Standards: Released: December 3, 2021; Label: Concord	—	—	—	—	—	—	—	
Innocence: Released: December 1, 2023; Label: Concord	—	—	—	—	—	—	—	
"—" denotes releases that did not chart

=== Live albums ===
Album details	Chart positions				Certifications (sales thresholds)
Album details	US	US R&B	US Jazz^{[A]}	AUS	Certifications (sales thresholds)
Kenny G Live: Released: November 21, 1989; Label: Arista	16	15	2	125	US: 4× Platinum
Best: Released: February 16, 2006; Label: Sony BMG	—	—	—	—	
An Evening of Rhythm & Romance: Released: October 6, 2009; Label: Eagle Rock	—	—	—	—	
"—" denotes releases that did not chart

=== Compilation albums ===
Album details	Chart positions						Certifications (sales thresholds)
Album details	US	US R&B	US Jazz	AUS	NZ	UK	Certifications (sales thresholds)
The Collection: Released: 1990; Label: Arista / BMG	—	—	—	45	—	—	
Montage: Released: 1990; Label: Arista / BMG	—	—	—	8	9	32	AUS: Gold
The Very Best of Kenny G: Released: 1994; Label: Arista / BMG	—	—	—	—	—	—	
Greatest Hits: Released: November 18, 1997; Label: Arista	19	15	1	42	30	38	US: 3× Platinum; AUS: Gold; UK: Silver
In America: Released: April 23, 2001; Label: Jazz Door	—	—	—	—	—	—	
Ultimate Kenny G: Released: June 10, 2003; Label: Arista / BMG Heritage	42	—	2	—	—	—	
Songbird: The Ultimate Collection: Released: August 2, 2004; Label: Arista / BMG	—	—	—	—	—	24	UK: Silver
The Romance of Kenny G: Released: September 1, 2004; Label: Green Hill / BMG	—	—	—	—	—	—	
Artist Collection: Kenny G: Released: October 12, 2004; Label: Arista / BMG	—	—	—	—	—	—	
The Greatest Holiday Classics: Released: October 18, 2005; Label: Arista	39	26	1	—	—	—	
The Essential Kenny G: Released: January 18, 2006; Label: Arista / Legacy	—	—	3	—	—	—	
The Holiday Collection: Released: June 13, 2006; Label: Sony BMG	85	40	1	—	—	—	
Playlist: The Very Best of Kenny G: Released: August 19, 2008; Label: Arista / Legacy	—	—	24^{[B]}	—	—	—	
Love Ballads: Released: September 19, 2008; Label: Sony BMG	—	—	—	—	—	—	
Forever in Love: The Best of Kenny G: Released: March 9, 2009; Label: Camden / Sony	—	—	—	—	—	—	
Super Hits: Released: May 26, 2009; Label: Sony	—	—	9	—	—	—	
'The Music of Kenny G: Released: September 29, 2009; Label: Arista / Legacy	—	—	—	—	—	—	
Breathless/At Last...The Duets Album: Released: April 10, 2012; Label: Sony	—	—	—	—	—	—	
The Christmas Classic Album: Released: October 2, 2012; Label: Sony BMG	128	—	2	—	—	—	
The Box Set Series: Released: January 28, 2014; Label: Legacy	—	—	47	—	—	—	
Original Album Classics: Released: March 18, 2016; Label: Arista / Legacy	—	—	—	—	—	—	
"—" denotes releases that did not chart

Notes

- ^{A} Peaked position on Billboard Top Contemporary Jazz chart.
- ^{B} Peaked at #13 on Billboard Top Contemporary Jazz chart.

== Extended plays ==
EP details
Six of Hearts
- Released: January 1, 1997
- Label: Arista

== Singles ==
=== As lead artist ===
List of singles as lead artist, with selected peak chart positions and certifications
Title	Year	Chart positions									Certifications	Album
Title	Year	US	US R&B	US AC	US Pop	US Rhy.	US Jazz	AUS	JAM Air.	UK	Certifications	Album
Hi, How Ya Doin'?"	1984	—	23	—	—	—	—	—	*	70		G Force
Love on the Rise" (with Kashif)	1985	—	24	—	—	—	—	—	*	87		Gravity
Don't Make Me Wait for Love" (featuring Lenny Williams)	1986	15^{[A]}	17	2	—	—	—	—	*	—		Duotones
What Does It Take (To Win Your Love)" (featuring Ellis Hall)	1986	—	15	—	—	—	—	—	*	64		Duotones
Songbird"	1987	4	23	3	—	—	—	—	*	22	US: Gold	Duotones
Silhouette"	1988	13	35	2	—	—	—	—	*	—		Silhouette
Against Doctor's Orders"	1989	—	65	—	—	—	—	—	*	—		Silhouette
We've Saved the Best for Last" (featuring Smokey Robinson)	1989	47	18	4	—	—	—	—	*	—		Silhouette
Going Home"	1989	56	46	5	—	—	—	—	*	—		Kenny G Live
Theme from Dying Young"	1991	—	—	—	—	—	—	95	10	—		Dying Young: Original Soundtrack Album
Forever in Love"	1992	18	73	1	18	33	—	49	*	47	US: Gold	Breathless
By the Time This Night Is Over" (featuring Peabo Bryson)	1993	25	37	1	29	—	—	122	*	56		Breathless
Sentimental"	1993	72	—	27	—	—	—	—	*	—		Breathless
Even If My Heart Would Break" (featuring Aaron Neville)	1994	—	—	28	—	—	—	—	*	—		Breathless
Have Yourself a Merry Little Christmas"	1995	—	—	26	—	—	—	—	*	—		Miracles: The Holiday Album
The Moment"	1996	63	62	16	—	—	—	—	*	98		The Moment
Havana" (Remix)	1997	66	—	10	—	—	—	—	*	88		The Moment
My Heart Will Go On"	1997	—	—	19	—	—	—	—	*	—		Greatest Hits
What a Wonderful World" (featuring Louis Armstrong)	1999	—	—	22	—	—	—	—	*	—		Classics in the Key of G
Auld Lang Syne"	1999	7	57	3	40	—	—	—	*	—		Faith: A Holiday Album
One More Time" (featuring Chanté Moore)	2002	—	—	19	—	—	—	—	*	—		Paradise
Deck the Halls/The Twelve Days of Christmas"	2002	—	—	22	—	—	—	—	*	—		Wishes: A Holiday Album
Auld Lang Syne" (Freedom Mix)	2003	—	98	—	—	—	—	—	*	—		Wishes: A Holiday Album
I Believe I Can Fly" (featuring Yolanda Adams)	2005	—	—	28	—	—	—	—	*	—		At Last...The Duets Album
The Way You Move" (featuring Earth, Wind & Fire)	2005	—	—	12	—	—	12	—	*	—		At Last...The Duets Album
My Favorite Things"	2005	—	—	22	—	—	—	—	*	—		The Greatest Holiday Classics
We Wish You a Merry Christmas"	2005	—	—	23	—	—	—	—	*	—		The Greatest Holiday Classics
Jingle Bell Rock"	2006	—	—	35	—	—	—	—	*	—		The Greatest Holiday Classics
Fall Again" (featuring Robin Thicke)	2010	—	55	—	—	—	6	—	*	—		Heart and Soul
Heart and Soul"	2010	—	—	—	—	—	1	—	*	—		Heart and Soul
Namaste" (with Rahul Sharma)	2012	—	—	—	—	—	1	—	*	—		Namaste
Bossa Réal"	2015	—	—	—	—	—	4	—	*	—		Brazilian Nights
Big Band Boogie" (with Richard Marx)	2025	—	—	—	—	—	—	—	*	—		After Hours
"—" denotes a recording that did not chart or was not released in that territory. "*" denotes that the chart did not exist at that time.

- ^{A} Charted on re-release (after "Songbird" reached #4).

=== As featured artist ===
List of singles as featured artist, with selected peak chart positions and certifications
Title	Year	Chart positions						Certifications	Album
Title	Year	US	US R&B	US AC	US Rhythmic	AUS	UK	Certifications	Album
"Voices That Care" (with Various artists)	1991	11	—	6	—	—	—		Charity Single
"Missing You Now" (Michael Bolton featuring Kenny G)	1991	12	—	1	—	61	28		Time, Love & Tenderness
"Every Time I Close My Eyes" (Babyface featuring Mariah Carey and Kenny G)	1996	6	5	17	4	40	13	US: Platinum	The Day/The Moment
"How Could an Angel Break My Heart" (Toni Braxton featuring Kenny G)	1997	—	—	12	—	87	22		Secrets
"Use This Gospel" (Kanye West featuring Clipse and Kenny G)	2019	37	20	—	—	36	—		Jesus Is King
"In Your Eyes (Remix)" (The Weeknd featuring Kenny G)	2020	—	—	—	—	—	—		After Hours
"More than Anybody" (Cheat Codes featuring Izzy Bizu and Kenny G)	2025	—	—	—	—	—	—		Future Renaissance
"Coming Home This Christmas" (Jonas Brothers featuring Kenny G)	2025	—	—	12	—	—	—		A Very Jonas Christmas Movie (Original Soundtrack)
"Cry" (Charlie Puth featuring Kenny G)	2026	—	—	—	—	—	—		Whatever's Clever!
"—" denotes releases that did not chart

== Other charted songs ==
List of other charted songs, with selected peak chart positions
Title	Year	Chart positions		Album
Title	Year	US AC	US Jazz	Album
"Loving You"	1997	8	—	Greatest Hits
"You're Beautiful"	2006	—	3	I'm in the Mood for Love...The Most Romantic Melodies of All Time
"Sax-O-Loco"	2008	—	1	Rhythm and Romance
"Sabor a Mi"	2008	—	30	Rhythm and Romance
"Tango"	2008	—	8	Rhythm and Romance
"Ritmo Y Romance (Rhythm & Romance)"	2008	—	10	Rhythm and Romance
"Letters from Home"	2010	—	22	Heart and Soul
"—" denotes releases that did not chart

== Other appearances ==
Year	Song	Album
1983	"Rumors" (Kashif featuring Kenny G)	Kashif
1986	"While the City Sleeps" (George Benson featuring Kenny G)	While the City Sleeps...
1986	"Did You Hear Thunder" (George Benson featuring Kenny G)	While the City Sleeps...
1987	"Love Power" (Dionne Warwick featuring Jeffrey Osborne and Kenny G)	Reservations for Two
1987	"Why Do Happy Memories Hurt So Bad" (Smokey Robinson featuring Kenny G)	
1987	"Keep Me" (Smokey Robinson featuring Kenny G)	
1987	"Keep Me" (Smokey Robinson featuring Kenny G)	One Heartbeat
1987	"Midnight Mood" (Kashif featuring Kenny G)	Love Changes
1987	"For the Love of You" (Whitney Houston featuring Kenny G)	Whitney
1987	"You Were in My Heart" (Jude Cole)	Jude Cole
1987	"Life of Luxury" (Jude Cole)	Jude Cole
1987	"G-Rit" (Lee Ritenour featuring Kenny G)	Portrait
1987	"Get Close to My Love" (Jennifer Holliday featuring Kenny G)	Get Close to My Love
1989	"If Ever A Love There Was" (Aretha Franklin featuring The Four Tops and Kenny G)	Through The Storm
1989	"Still in Love" (Patti LaBelle featuring Kenny G)	Be Yourself
1989	"Two Kinds of Love" (Stevie Nicks featuring Bruce Hornsby and Kenny G)	The Other Side of the Mirror
1989	"Our Love Runs Deep" (Richard Smith featuring Kenny G)	Bella Firenze
1990	"When You Cry" (The Winans featuring Kenny G)	The Return
1991	"Driving North / Moving In"	Dying Young: Original Soundtrack Album
1991	"Hillary's Theme"	Dying Young: Original Soundtrack Album
1991	"After The Love Has Gone" (David Foster featuring Kenny G)	Rechordings
1991	"Brogan" (Dudley Moore featuring Kenny G)	Songs Without Words
1992	"Halfway to Heaven" (Celine Dion featuring Kenny G)	Celine Dion
1992	"Waiting for You"	The Bodyguard: Original Soundtrack Album
1993	"All The Way"/"One for My Baby (and One More for the Road)" (Frank Sinatra featuring Kenny G)	Duets
1993	"Island Lady" (Tony Gable & 206 featuring Kenny G)	Tony Gable & 206
1994	"How Am I Supposed to Live Without You" (Live Version with Michael Bolton)	Grammy's Greatest Moments Volume II
1994	"Remember"	The Shadow Original Motion Picture Soundtrack
1994	"The Chipmunk Song (Christmas Don't Be Late)" (Alvin and the Chipmunks with Kenny G)	A Very Merry Chipmunk
1996	"Yo Te Amo (Do I Love You)" (Paul Anka with Anthea Anka featuring Barry Gibb and Kenny G)	Amigos
1998	"You Are My Woman" (Andy Lau featuring Kenny G)	A True Mob Story Soundtrack
1999	"The Island" (Barbra Streisand featuring Kenny G)	A Love Like Ours
1999	"New Day" (Wyclef Jean featuring Bono and Kenny G)	Life: Music Inspired by the Motion Picture
2003	"One More Time" (Operación Triunfo III featuring Beth and Kenny G)	Operación Triunfo II: La Fuerza de la Vida
2006	"Mi Manchi" (Andrea Bocelli featuring Kenny G)	Amore
2007	"A Te" (Andrea Bocelli featuring Kenny G)	The Best of Andrea Bocelli: Vivere
2008	"Just the Two of Us" (Johnny Mathis featuring Kenny G)	A Night to Remember
2008	"Breadline Blues" (David Benoit featuring Kenny G)	Jazz for Peanuts
2008	"Bésame Mucho" (Live Version with Stevie Wonder)	An Evening of Rhythm & Romance
2008	"Love Theme from St. Elmo's Fire" (David Foster featuring Kenny G)	Hit Man: David Foster and Friends
2009	"Little Sunflower" (Alexander Zonjic featuring Kenny G)	Doin' the D
2010	"Mi Morena" (Elaine Paige featuring Jon Secada and Kenny G)	Elaine Paige and Friends
2011	"Heart to Heart" (David Foster featuring Kenny Loggins and Kenny G)	Hit Man Returns: David Foster and Friends
2011	"Houdini" (Live Version with Foster the People)	Saturday Night Live Season 37
2012	"Rockin' Around the Christmas Tree" (John Travolta and Olivia Newton-John featuring Kenny G)	This Christmas
2013	"Cabin Down Below" (The Royal Concept featuring Kenny G)	Goldrushed
2014	"Let It Snow! Let It Snow! Let It Snow!" (Dave Koz featuring Kenny G)	The 25th of December
2014	"All I Want for Christmas Is You" (Idina Menzel featuring Kenny G)	Holiday Wishes
2014	"White Christmas" (Idina Menzel featuring Kenny G)	Holiday Wishes
2018	"Careless Whisper" (Train featuring Kenny G)	Greatest Hits
2019	"Use This Gospel" (Kanye West featuring Clipse and Kenny G)	Jesus Is King
2021	"Gary's Song"	The SpongeBob Movie: Sponge on the Run Soundtrack
2022	"Merkurius Gilded" (Imperial Triumphant featuring Kenny G)	Spirit of Ecstasy
2022	"Hanging Out" (Ben Rector featuring Kenny G)	The Joy of Music

== Music videos ==
Year	Video	Director
1984	"Hi, How Ya Doin'?" (featuring Barry Johnson)	
1985	"Love on the Rise" (with Kashif)	
1986	"Don't Make Me Wait for Love"	
1987	"Songbird"	
1987	"Midnight Motion"	
1987	"Love Power" (Dionne Warwick with Jeffrey Osborne featuring Kenny G)	
1988	"Silhoutte"	Jim Yukich
1989	"Against Doctor's Orders"	
1989	"We've Saved the Best for Last" (featuring Smokey Robinson)	
1990	"Going Home"	
1990	"Georgia on My Mind" (Michael Bolton featuring Kenny G)	
1991	"Voices That Care" (with Various artists)	David S. Jackson
1991	"Theme from Dying Young"	
1992	"Forever in Love"	Ken Nahoum
1993	"By the Time This Night is Over" (featuring Peabo Bryson)	Bud Schaetzle
1993	"Sentimental"	
1995	"Have Yourself a Merry Little Christmas"	
1996	"The Moment"	
1997	"Havana" [Remix] (featuring Savion Glover)	Wayne Isham
1999	"Auld Lang Syne (The Millennium Mix)"	
2010	"I'm Your Daddy" (Weezer music video)	Johannes Gamble
2011	"Last Friday Night (T.G.I.F.)" (Katy Perry music video)	Marc Klasfeld
2020	"After Hours" (The Weeknd music video)	
