= List of awards and nominations received by Kenny G =

Kenny G awards and nominations
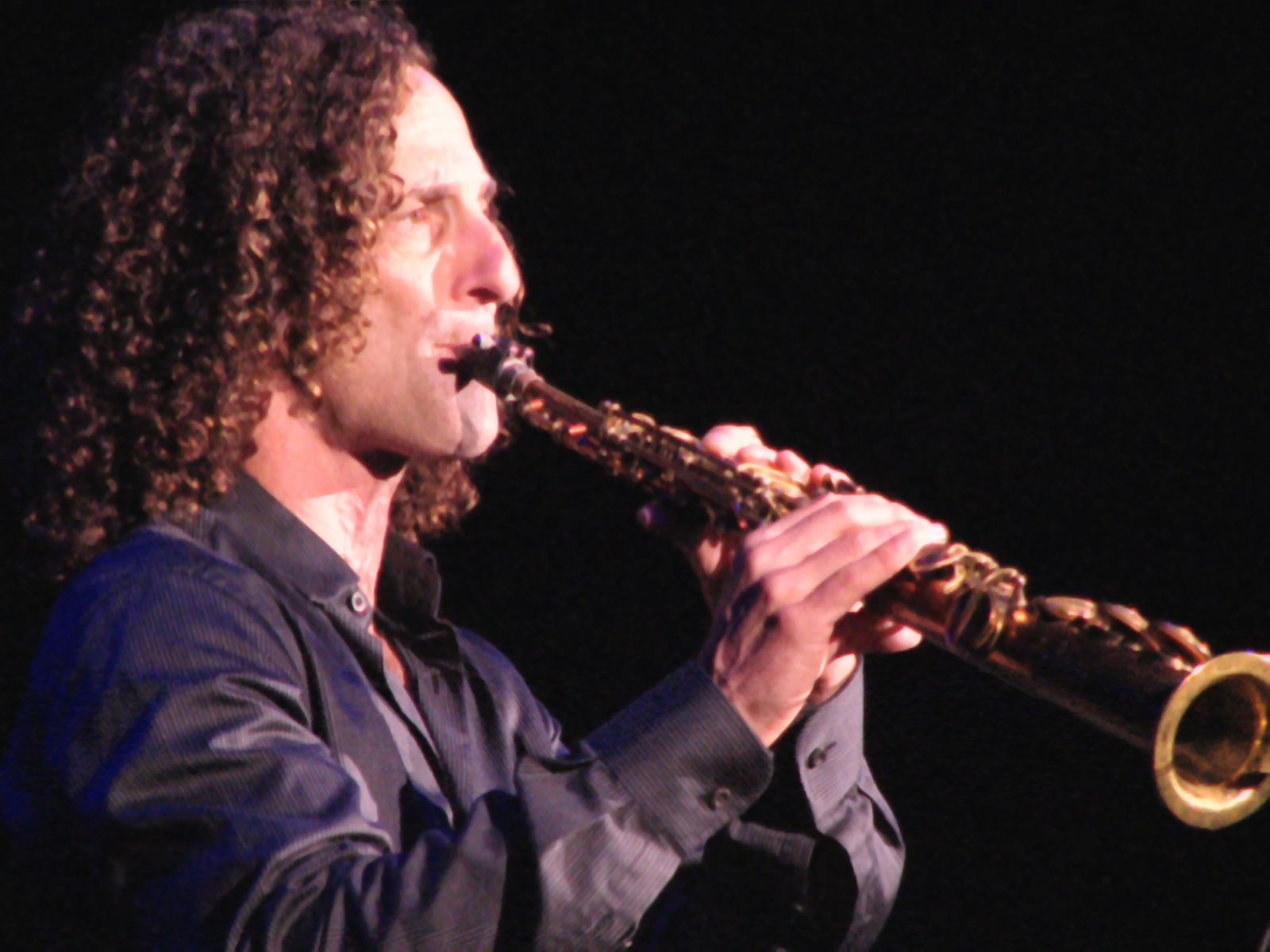
- Kenny G playing in Shanghai in 2007
Awards and nominations
Award	Wins	Nominations
American Music Awards	1	2
Billboard	0	1
Grammy	1	16
Soul Train	2	4

Totals (Note: Certain award groups do not simply award one winner. They acknowledge several different recipients, have runners-up, and have third place. Since this is a specific recognition and is different from losing an award, runner-up mentions are considered wins in this award tally. For simplification and to avoid errors, each award in this list has been presumed to have had a prior nomination.)
- Wins: 4
- Nominations: 24

This is a comprehensive list of awards and nominations received by American saxophonist Kenny G.

== American Music Awards ==
The American Music Awards is an annual awards ceremony created by Dick Clark in 1973.

Year	Nominee/work	Award	Result
1994	Kenny G	Favorite Adult Contemporary Artist	Won
1994	Breathless	Favorite Adult Contemporary Album	Nominated

== Billboard Music Awards ==
The Billboard Music Awards is sponsored by Billboard magazine and is held annually in December.

Year	Nominee/work	Award	Result
1993	Kenny G	Top Pop Artist	Nominated

== Grammy Awards ==
The Grammy Awards are held annually by the National Academy of Recording Arts and Sciences.

Year	Nominee/work	Award	Result
1987	Duotones	Best R&B Instrumental Performance	Nominated
1989	Silhouette	Best Pop Instrumental Performance	Nominated
1990	Breadline Blues	Best Pop Instrumental Performance	Nominated
1991	"Going Home"	Best Pop Instrumental Performance	Nominated
1992	Theme from Dying Young	Best Pop Instrumental Performance	Nominated
1994	"Forever in Love"	Best Pop Instrumental Performance	Nominated
1994	"Forever in Love"	Best Instrumental Composition	Won
1995	"Sentimental"	Best Pop Instrumental Performance	Nominated
1996	Have Yourself a Merry Little Christmas	Best Pop Instrumental Performance	Nominated
1998	"Havana"	Best Pop Instrumental Performance	Nominated
1999	My Heart Will Go On	Best Pop Instrumental Performance	Nominated
2001	Faith: A Holiday Album	Best Contemporary Instrumental Album	Nominated
2003	"All the Way" with Brian McKnight	Best R&B Performance by a Duo or Group with Vocals	Nominated
2003	Paradise	Best Contemporary Instrumental Album	Nominated
2004	Wishes: A Holiday Album	Best Contemporary Instrumental Album	Nominated
2011	Heart and Soul	Best Contemporary Instrumental Album	Nominated

== Hong Kong Film Awards ==
Year	Nominee/work	Award	Result
1999	"You Are My Woman" with T.K. Chan and Walter Afanasieff	Best Original Film Song	Nominated

== Latin Grammy Awards ==
The Latin Grammy Awards is an award by the Latin Academy of Recording Arts & Sciences to recognize outstanding achievement in the Latin Music industry.

Year	Nominee/work	Award	Result
2008	Rhythm & Romance	Best Instrumental Album	Nominated
2015	Brazilian Nights	Best Instrumental Album	Nominated

== NAACP Image Awards ==
Year	Nominee/work	Award	Result
1994	Kenny G	Outstanding Jazz Artist	Won
1998	Kenny G	Outstanding Jazz Artist	Won

== Soul Train Music Awards ==
The Soul Train Music Awards is an annual award show which previously aired in national television syndication, and honors the best in Black music and entertainment. It is produced by the makers of Soul Train, the program from which it takes its name.

Year	Nominee/work	Award	Result
1987	Duotones	Best Jazz Album	Nominated
1989	Silhouette	Best Jazz Album	Won
1990	Kenny G Live	Best Jazz Album	Nominated
1994	Breathless	Best Jazz Album	Won
