= The Essential Kenny G =

Greatest hits album by Kenny G
- Released: January 24, 2006
- Genre: Jazz
- Length: 77:18 (Disc One); 77:14 (Disc Two); 154:32 (Total)
- Label: Arista
- Producer: Kenny G; Walter Afanasieff; Michael Bolton; Peter Bunetta; Rick Chudacoff; David Foster; Preston Glass; Jeff Magid; Dan Shea

Kenny G chronology
The Greatest Holiday Classics (2005)	The Essential Kenny G (2006)	Best (2006)

Professional ratings
Review scores
Source	Rating
AllMusic	4/5 stars

The Essential Kenny G is a greatest hits album by saxophonist Kenny G, released by Arista Records in 2006. It reached number 3 on the Billboard Contemporary Jazz chart. Two different editions of the album were released: the single-disc version contains fifteen songs, while the double-disc edition has 31 songs.

== Track listing ==
=== Single-disc version ===
1. "What A Wonderful World" (with Louis Armstrong) – 3:01
2. "Morning" – 5:15
3. "Sister Rose" – 6:13
4. "Even If My Heart Would Break" (featuring Aaron Neville) – 4:59
5. "The Moment" – 6:01
6. "Summertime" (featuring George Benson) – 6:44
7. "Missing You Now" (with Michael Bolton) – 4:33
8. "G-Bop" – 4:06
9. "My Heart Will Go On" – 4:22
10. "Beautiful" (featuring Chaka Khan) – 3:45
11. "Havana" – 7:22
12. "Going Home" – 5:30
13. "Januari" (featuring Glenn Fredly) – 3:51
14. "The Way You Move" (featuring Earth, Wind & Fire) – 4:09
15. "Jasmine Flower" – 4:36

=== Double-disc version ===
==== Disc 1 ====
1. "Songbird" – 5:03
2. "Sade" – 4:20
3. "Slip of the Tongue" – 4:53
4. "Don't Make Me Wait for Love" (featuring Lenny Williams) – 4:03
5. "Silhouette" – 5:29
6. "Against Doctor's Orders" – 4:44
7. "What Does It Take (to Win Your Love)" (featuring Ellis Hall) – 4:08
8. "Brazil" – 4:38
9. "Theme from Dying Young" – 4:01
10. "We've Saved the Best for Last" (featuring Smokey Robinson) – 4:20
11. "Forever in Love" – 4:59
12. "Midnight Motion (Live)" – 8:23
13. "By the Time This Night Is Over" (featuring Peabo Bryson) – 4:24
14. "Loving You" – 3:20
15. "Have Yourself a Merry Little Christmas" – 3:58
16. "Sentimental" – 6:35
17. "De Mil Colores" (featuring Rosario Flores) – 3:59 (Bonus track)

==== Disc 2 ====
1. "What a Wonderful World" (with Louis Armstrong) – 3:01
2. "Morning" – 5:14
3. "Sister Rose" – 6:14
4. "Even If My Heart Would Break" (featuring Aaron Neville) – 5:00
5. "The Moment" – 6:03
6. "Summertime" (featuring George Benson) – 6:46
7. "Missing You Now" (with Michael Bolton) – 4:35
8. "Pick Up the Pieces" (featuring David Sanborn) – 4:15
9. "My Heart Will Go On" – 4:23
10. "Beautiful" (featuring Chaka Khan) – 3:46
11. "Havana" – 7:23
12. "Going Home" – 5:32
13. "The Way You Move" (featuring Earth, Wind & Fire) – 4:10
14. "Deck the Halls / The Twelve Days of Christmas" – 3:00
15. "Auld Lang Syne (The Millennium Mix)" – 7:52
