= Greatest Hits (Kenny G album) =

Greatest hits album by Kenny G
- Released: November 18, 1997
- Recorded: 1985 – 1997
- Genre: Smooth jazz
- Length: 77:03
- Label: Arista
- Producer: Kenny G; Narada Michael Walden; Phil Ramone; Dan Shea; Hank Cattaneo; Walter Afanasieff; David Foster; Preston Glass; Michael Bolton

Kenny G chronology
Six of Hearts (1997)	Greatest Hits (1997)	Classics in the Key of G (1999)

My Heart Will Go On

Professional ratings
Review scores
Source	Rating
AllMusic	4.5/5 stars
Entertainment Weekly	B−

Greatest Hits is the second greatest hits album by saxophonist Kenny G. It was released by Arista Records in 1997 and peaked at number one on the Contemporary Jazz Albums chart, number 15 on the R&B/Hip-Hop Albums chart and number 19 on the Billboard 200.

== Production ==
The album combined Kenny G's hits since the beginning of his career. Shortly after the release of the album, the blockbuster film Titanic was released, and having already produced the hit single of My Heart Will Go On performed by Celine Dion, producer Afanasieff returned to the studio with Kenny G to produce an instrumental version of the Love Theme from Titanic.

This recording was released as a single and was bundled with the Greatest Hits as a promotional item. The cover is a photograph from the Greatest Hits booklet with water superimposed over the top. The packaging for the single declared itself to be 'The first instrumental version available of this classic theme for all time'. Since this first release, it has appeared on every Kenny G greatest hits compilation.

== Track listing ==
No.	Title	Writer(s)	Original album	Length
1.	"Songbird"	Kenny G	Duotones (1986)	4:00
2.	"Silhouette"	Kenny G	Silhouette (1988)	4:32
3.	"Forever in Love"	Kenny G	Breathless (1992)	4:59
4.	"Every Time I Close My Eyes" (lead vocal: Babyface)	Kenneth Brian Edmonds	The Moment (1996)	4:59
5.	"Sentimental"	Kenny G; Walter Afanasieff	Breathless	4:18
6.	"The Moment"	Kenny G	The Moment	4:43
7.	"How Could an Angel Break My Heart" (lead vocal: Toni Braxton)	Toni Braxton; Kenneth Brian Edmonds	Toni Braxton album, Secrets (1996)	4:22
8.	"Loving You"	Kenny G; Dan Shea; Walter Afanasieff	Previously unreleased	3:19
9.	"You Send Me" (lead vocal: Michael Bolton)	Sam Cooke	Previously unreleased	4:03
10.	"Going Home"	Kenny G; Walter Afanasieff	Kenny G Live (1989)	4:15
11.	"Havana"	Kenny G; Walter Afanasieff	The Moment	7:22
12.	"By the Time This Night Is Over" (lead vocal: Peabo Bryson)	Michael Bolton; Andy Goldmark; Diane Warren	Breathless	4:21
13.	"Baby G"	Kenny G; Dan Shea; Walter Afanasieff	Previously unreleased	3:35
14.	"Don't Make Me Wait for Love" (lead vocal: Lenny Williams)	Narada Michael Walden; Preston Glass; Walter Afanasieff	Duotones	4:06
15.	"Theme from Dying Young"	James Newton Howard	Dying Young Soundtrack (1991)	4:02
16.	"All the Way/One for My Baby (And One More for the Road)" (lead vocal: Frank Sinatra)	Jimmy Van Heusen; Sammy Cahn/Harold Arlen; Johnny Mercer	Frank Sinatra album, Duets (1993)	6:07
17.	"Innocence"	Kenny G; Walter Afanasieff	The Moment	4:00
Total length:				77:03

Import bonus tracks
No.	Title	Writer(s)	Original album	Length
1.	"My Heart Will Go On (Love Theme from Titanic)"	James Horner; Will Jennings	Previously unreleased	4:22
2.	"Asian Dream"	Kenny G; Walter Afanasieff	Previously unreleased	4:07
3.	"The Joy Of Life"	Kenny G	Breathless	4:21
4.	"Always"	Kenny G	The Moment	5:35
5.	"The Wedding Song"	Kenny G; Walter Afanasieff	Breathless	3:24
Total length:				21:49

== Charts ==
=== Weekly charts ===
Chart (1997-1998)	Peak position
Australian Albums (ARIA)	42
Hungarian Albums (MAHASZ)	39
New Zealand Albums (RMNZ)	30
Taiwanese International Albums (IFPI)	3
UK Albums (OCC)	38
US Billboard 200	19
US Top Contemporary Jazz Albums (Billboard)	1
US Top R&B/Hip-Hop Albums (Billboard)	15

=== Year-end charts ===
Year-end chart performance for Greatest Hits by Kenny G
Chart (1998)	Position
US Billboard 200	55
US Top R&B/Hip-Hop Albums (Billboard)	83

Chart (2002)	Position
Canadian R&B Albums (Nielsen SoundScan)	123

== Certifications and sales ==
Region	Certification	Certified units/sales
Australia (ARIA)	Gold	35,000^{^}
Brazil (Pro-Música Brasil)	Platinum	250,000^{*}
Canada (Music Canada)	Platinum	100,000^{^}
Hong Kong (IFPI Hong Kong)	Platinum	20,000^{*}
Japan (RIAJ)	Platinum	200,000^{^}
Spain (Promusicae)	Gold	50,000^{^}
United Kingdom (BPI)	Gold	100,000^{*}
United States (RIAA)	3× Platinum	3,000,000^{^}
Summaries
Asia Pacific	—	1,500,000
^{*} Sales figures based on certification alone.^{^} Shipments figures based on certification alone.
