= William Ross (composer) =

American musician (born 1948)

- Also known as: Bill Ross
- Born: July 20, 1948 (age 78); Ventura, California, U.S.
- Occupations: Composer, conductor
- Years active: 1983–present
- Website: williamrossmusic.com

William Ross (born July 20, 1948) is an American composer, orchestrator, arranger, conductor and music director. Ross is the recipient of three Primetime Emmy Awards (in 2007 and 2009), one Daytime Emmy Award (in 1991), and has been nominated for one Annie Award (in 2008). He has been nominated twice for the Grammy Award for Best Instrumental Arrangement Accompanying Vocalist(s).

Ross is the arranger for Andrea Bocelli's version of "Amazing Grace" performed during his concert Andrea Bocelli: Music for Hope - Live From Duomo di Milano, broadcast live on YouTube to over 25 million viewers on April 12, 2020.

== Career ==
Ross has worked with artists and musicians ranging from Hollywood composers John Williams, Alan Silvestri, John Powell, Michael Giacchino, Klaus Badelt and Michael Kamen, to pop music artists including Barbra Streisand, Celine Dion, Andrea Bocelli, Josh Groban, Laura Pausini, Whitney Houston, Kenny G, Michael Jackson, David Foster, Quincy Jones, Babyface and Sting. He has arranged the music for multiple Olympic Games opening and closing ceremonies from 1998 to 2010.

Ross composed the soundtrack for assorted films, including Tuck Everlasting, My Dog Skip, The Young Black Stallion and Ladder 49. He adapted and conducted John Williams' themes for Harry Potter and the Chamber of Secrets. In 2008, he scored the CGI-film The Tale of Despereaux, from Universal Studios.

Ross is the music director for many shows and artists, including Barbra Streisand's 2006 US tour and 2007 European tour, as well as the 79th, 83rd, 85th and 86th Academy Awards. Ross regularly arranges and conducts the Academy Awards at the Dolby Theatre, overseeing all music cues throughout the broadcast.

Ross is credited on the soundtrack of Star Wars: The Last Jedi as an additional conductor. His work is featured on the Universal Orlando theme park ride Skull Island: Reign of Kong. He also adapted Williams' main theme for the end credits of the Disney+ series Obi-Wan Kenobi.

== Credits ==
=== Feature films ===
Year	Title	Director(s)	Composer	Conductor	Orchestrator	Notes	Source
1983	The Hasty Heart	Martin M. Speer	Yes	No	No		
1987	Lethal Weapon	Richard Donner	No	No	Yes		
1987	The Return of Sherlock Holmes	Kevin Connor	Yes	No	No		
1988	Beetlejuice	Tim Burton	No	Yes	No		
1988	Big Top Pee-wee	Randal Kleiser	No	Yes	No		
1988	Hot to Trot	Michael Dinner	No	Yes	No		
1988	Ernest Saves Christmas	John Cherry	No	No	Yes		
1990	Catchfire	Dennis Hopper	No	Yes	Yes		
1990	Die Hard 2	Renny Harlin	No	No	Yes		
1990	Madhouse	Tom Ropelewski	No	No	Yes		
1990	Ski Patrol	Richard Correll	No	No	Yes		
1991	Defenseless	Martin Campbell	No	No	Yes		
1991	Dutch	Peter Faiman	No	No	Yes		
1991	Father of the Bride	Charles Shyer	No	No	Yes		
1991	If Looks Could Kill	William Dear	No	Yes	Yes		
1991	Nothing but Trouble	Dan Aykroyd	No	No	Yes		
1991	One Good Cop	Heywood Gould	Yes	No	Yes		
1991	Ricochet	Russell Mulcahy	No	No	Yes		
1991	Robin Hood: Prince of Thieves	Kevin Reynolds	No	No	Yes		
1991	Rover Dangerfield	James L. George; Bob Seeley	No	No	Yes		
1992	The Bodyguard	Mick Jackson	No	No	Yes		
1992	Death Becomes Her	Robert Zemeckis	No	No	Yes		
1992	FernGully: The Last Rainforest	Bill Kroyer	No	No	Yes		
1992	Jennifer 8	Bruce Robinson	No	Yes	No		
1992	The Johnsons	Rudolf van den Berg	No	No	Yes		
1992	Lethal Weapon 3	Richard Donner	No	No	Yes		
1992	Shining Through	David Seltzer	No	No	Yes		
1992	Stop! Or My Mom Will Shoot	Roger Spottiswoode	No	No	Yes		
1993	Coneheads	Steve Barron	No	No	Yes		
1993	Cop and a Half	Henry Winkler	No	No	Yes		
1993	Grumpy Old Men	Donald Petrie	No	No	Yes		
1993	Last Action Hero	John McTiernan	No	No	Yes		
1993	Look Who's Talking Now	Tom Ropelewski	Yes	No	No		
1993	The Meteor Man	Robert Townsend	No	No	Yes		
1993	The Sandlot	David Mickey Evans	No	No	Yes		
1993	Super Mario Bros.	Rocky Morton; Annabel Jankel	No	No	Yes		
1993	The Three Musketeers	Stephen Herek	No	No	Yes		
1993	Wilder Napalm	Glenn Gordon Caron	No	No	Yes		
1994	Blown Away	Stephen Hopkins	No	No	Yes		
1994	Clean Slate	Mick Jackson	No	No	Yes		
1994	Cops & Robbersons	Michael Ritchie	Yes	No	No		
1994	The Flintstones	Brian Levant	No	No	Yes		
1994	Forrest Gump	Robert Zemeckis	No	No	Yes		
1994	The Little Rascals	Penelope Spheeris	Yes	No	Yes		
1994	Richie Rich	Donald Petrie	No	No	Yes		
1994	Star Trek Generations	David Carson	No	No	Yes		
1994	Terminal Velocity	Deran Sarafian	No	No	Yes		
1994	Thumbelina	Don Bluth; Gary Goldman	Yes	Yes	Yes	First score for an animated film	
1995	The Amazing Panda Adventure	Christopher Cain	Yes	No	No		
1995	Father of the Bride Part II	Charles Shyer	No	No	Yes		
1995	Grumpier Old Men	Howard Deutch	No	No	Yes		
1995	Judge Dredd	Danny Cannon	No	No	Yes		
1995	Operation Dumbo Drop	Simon Wincer	No	No	Yes		
1995	The Perez Family	Mira Nair	No	No	Yes		
1995	The Quick and the Dead	Sam Raimi	No	No	Yes		
1995	Waiting to Exhale	Forest Whitaker	No	Yes	Yes		
1996	Black Sheep	Penelope Spheeris	Yes	Yes	Yes		
1996	Eraser	Chuck Russell	No	No	Yes		
1996	The Evening Star	Robert Harling	Yes	No	Yes		
1996	The Long Kiss Goodnight	Renny Harlin	No	No	Yes		
1996	My Fellow Americans	Peter Segal	Yes	No	No		
1996	Sgt. Bilko	Jonathan Lynn	No	No	Yes		
1996	Tin Cup	Ron Shelton	Yes	No	Yes		
1997	Contact	Robert Zemeckis	No	No	Yes		
1997	Mouse Hunt	Gore Verbinski	No	No	Yes		
1997	A Smile Like Yours	Keith Samples	Yes	No	No		
1997	Volcano	Mick Jackson	No	No	Yes		
1998	Holy Man	Stephen Herek	No	No	Yes		
1998	The Odd Couple II	Howard Deutch	No	No	Yes		
1998	The Parent Trap	Nancy Meyers	No	No	Yes		
1998	Practical Magic	Griffin Dunne	No	No	Yes		
1998	T-Rex: Back to the Cretaceous	Brett Leonard	Yes	No	Yes		
1999	Payback	Brian Helgeland	No	No	Yes		
1999	Stuart Little	Rob Minkoff	No	No	Yes		
2000	My Dog Skip	Jay Russell	Yes	Yes	Yes		
2000	Reindeer Games	John Frankenheimer	No	No	Yes		
2000	What Women Want	Nancy Meyers	No	No	Yes		
2001	Her Majesty	Mark J. Gordon	Yes	No	No		
2001	Life with Judy Garland: Me and My Shadows	Robert Allan Ackerman	Yes	No	No		
2001	The Mummy Returns	Stephen Sommers	No	No	Yes		
2002	Eye See You	Jim Gillespie	Additional Music	No	No		
2002	Harry Potter and the Chamber of Secrets	Chris Columbus	No	Yes	No	also Score Adaptation	
2002	Lilo & Stitch	Chris Sanders; Dean DeBlois	No	No	Yes		
2002	Stuart Little 2	Rob Minkoff	No	No	Yes		
2002	Tuck Everlasting	Jay Russell	Yes	No	No		
2003	The Matrix Reloaded	The Wachowskis	No	No	Yes		
2003	The Young Black Stallion	Simon Wincer	Yes	No	No		
2004	Catwoman	Pitof	No	Yes	No		
2004	Ladder 49	Jay Russell	Yes	Yes	Yes		
2004	The Polar Express	Robert Zemeckis	No	No	Yes		
2004	Van Helsing	Stephen Sommers	No	No	Yes		
2005	The Game of Their Lives	David Anspaugh	Yes	No	No		
2006	Driftwood	Tim Sullivan	Yes	Yes	No		
2006	Poseidon	Wolfgang Petersen	No	Yes	No		
2007	September Dawn	Christopher Cain	Yes	No	No		
2007	TMNT	Kevin Munroe	No	Yes	No		
2008	The Tale of Despereaux	Sam Fell; Robert Stevenhagen	Yes	No	No		
2009	A Christmas Carol	Robert Zemeckis	No	No	Yes		
2009	The Mighty Macs	Tim Chambers	Yes	No	No		
2010	Knight and Day	James Mangold	No	Yes	No		
2011	Balls to the Wall	Penelope Spheeris	Yes	No	No		
2011	Captain America: The First Avenger	Joe Johnston	No	No	Yes		
2011	Touchback	Don Handfield	Yes	No	Yes		
2011	A Very Harold & Kumar 3D Christmas	Todd Strauss-Schulson	Yes	No	No		
2012	The Hunger Games	Gary Ross	No	No	Additional Music Arranger		
2012	Steel Magnolias	Kenny Leon	Yes	No	No		
2013	Alone yet Not Alone	Ray Bengston; George D. Escobar	Yes	No	No	also Producer	
2013	The Croods	Chris Sanders; Kirk DeMicco	No	No	Yes		
2013	The Liberator	Alberto Arvelo	No	No	Yes	also Score Adaptation	
2014	50 to 1	Jim Wilson	Yes	No	No		
2014	In My Dreams	Kenny Leon	Yes	No	No		
2014	The Monuments Men	George Clooney	No	No	Yes		
2015	Away and Back	Jeff Bleckner	Yes	No	No		
2015	Star Wars: The Force Awakens	J. J. Abrams	No	Yes	Yes		
2015	To Have and to Hold	Ray Bengston	Yes	No	No		
2016	I'll Be Home for Christmas	James Brolin	Yes	No	No		
2016	Rogue One	Gareth Edwards	No	No	Yes		
2017	Spider-Man: Homecoming	Jon Watts	No	No	Yes		
2018	Destination Wedding	Victor Levin	Yes	No	No		
2018	Ready Player One	Steven Spielberg	No	No	Yes		
2019	Star Wars: The Rise of Skywalker	J. J. Abrams	No	Yes	Yes		
2020	All My Life	Marc Meyers	No	Yes	Yes		
2020	Da 5 Bloods	Spike Lee	No	No	Yes		
2020	The New Mutants	Josh Boone	No	Yes	Yes		
2021	Coming 2 America	Craig Brewer	No	Yes	Yes		
2021	Ghostbusters: Afterlife	Jason Reitman	No	Yes	No	additional orchestration and conducting	
2021	The Marksman	Robert Lorenz	No	No	Yes		
2022	Avatar: The Way of Water	James Cameron	No	Yes	Yes		
2023	The Beanie Bubble	Kristin Gore; Damian Kulash	No	Yes	Yes		
2023	Indiana Jones and the Dial of Destiny	James Mangold	No	No	Yes		
2023	Wonderwell	Vlad Marsavin	Yes	No	No		
2026	Disclosure Day	Steven Spielberg	No	Yes	Yes	Orchestrations and conducting with John Williams and Randy Kerber	

=== Television ===
Year	Title	Creator(s)	Composer	Conductor	Orchestrator	Source
1989	Beauty and the Beast	Ron Koslow	Yes	No	No	
1990	MacGyver	Lee David Zlotoff	Yes	No	No	
1990	Matlock	Dean Hargrove	Yes	No	No	
1990	Tiny Toon Adventures	Tom Ruegger	Yes	No	No	
1994	Golden Fiddles	Claude Fournier; Sheila Sibley	Yes	No	No	
2014	Operation Change		Yes	No	No	
2022	Halo	Kyle Killen; Steven Kane	No	Yes	Yes	
2022	Obi-Wan Kenobi	Joby Harold (showrunner)	No	No	Score Adaptation	
2023	The Great	Tony McNamara	No	Yes	Yes	

=== Albums ===
==== As arranger ====
Year	Title	Artist(s)	Source
1990	If There Was a Way	Dwight Yoakam	
1991	Lara Fabian	Lara Fabian	
1991	Rechordings	David Foster	
1992	Breathless	Kenny G	
1992	Wynonna	Wynonna Judd	
1993	Back to Broadway	Barbra Streisand	
1993	The Colour of My Love	Celine Dion	
1994	All-4-One	All-4-One	
1994	The Concert	Barbra Streisand	
1994	Crazy	Julio Iglesias	
1994	Miracles: The Holiday Album	Kenny G	
1994	Permiso de volar	Alejandro Lerner	
1994	Timepiece	Kenny Rogers	
1994	Through the Fire	Peabo Bryson	
1994	Read My Mind	Reba McEntire	
1995	Moving On	Oleta Adams	
1995	HIStory: Past, Present and Future, Book I	Michael Jackson	
1995	3	Alejandro Sanz	
1995	Universal Nubian Voices	U.N.V.	
1996	The Day	Babyface	
1996	Falling Into You	Celine Dion	
1996	Measure of a Man	Kevin Sharp	
1996	The Moment	Kenny G	
1996	Super Hits	Dolly Parton	
1997	Collection	Wynonna Judd	
1997	Greatest Hits	Kenny G	
1997	Higher Ground	Barbra Streisand	
1997	Let's Talk About Love	Celine Dion	
1997	My Soul	Coolio	
1998	Bathhouse Betty	Bette Midler	
1998	Double Live	Garth Brooks	
1998	Faith	Faith Hill	
1998	My Life: The Greatest Hits	Julio Iglesias	
1998	Never Say Never	Brandy	
1998	The Nu Nation Project	Kirk Franklin	
1998	The Movie Album: As Time Goes By	Neil Diamond	
1998	These Are Special Times	Celine Dion	
1998	Time	Lionel Richie	
1998	Vuelve	Ricky Martin	
1999	All the Way... A Decade of Song	Celine Dion	
1999	Amarte Es un Placer	Luis Miguel	
1999	Classics in the Key of G	Kenny G	
1999	Enrique	Enrique Iglesias	
1999	Faith: A Holiday Album	Kenny G	
1999	From Q with Love	Quincy Jones	
1999	Lace	Lace	
1999	A Love Like Ours	Barbra Streisand	
1999	Snowfall on the Sahara	Natalie Cole	
1999	Sogno	Andrea Bocelli	
1999	Tara Lyn Hart	Tara Lyn Hart	
2000	Mathis on Broadway	Johnny Mathis	
2000	Nathan Michael Shawn Wanya	Boyz II Men	
2000	Seul	Garou	
2000	Si j’étais elle	Julien Clerc	
2000	Timeless: Live in Concert	Barbra Streisand	
2000	Whitney: The Greatest Hits	Whitney Houston	
2001	The Best of Laura Pausini: E ritorno da te	Laura Pausini	
2001	Christmas Memories	Barbra Streisand	
2001	Glitter	Mariah Carey	
2001	Irresistible	Jessica Simpson	
2001	Josh Groban	Josh Groban	
2001	Nue	Lara Fabian	
2002	The Essential Barbra Streisand	Barbra Streisand	
2002	Josh Groban in Concert	Josh Groban	
2002	Mended	Marc Anthony	
2002	A New Day Has Come	Celine Dion	
2002	Paradise	Kenny G	
2002	Stripped	Christina Aguilera	
2002	Wishes: A Holiday Album	Kenny G	
2003	Buen Viaje	Alejandro Lerner	
2003	Closer	Josh Groban	
2003	Kristy Starling	Kristy Starling	
2003	Michael Bublé	Michael Bublé	
2003	One Heart	Celine Dion	
2003	Ultimate Kenny G	Kenny G	
2004	At Last...The Duets Album	Kenny G	
2004	Historias e Histeria	La Ley	
2004	Merry Christmas with Love	Clay Aiken	
2004	Miracle	Celine Dion	
2005	Bette Midler Sings the Peggy Lee Songbook	Bette Midler	
2005	Hurricane	Eric Benét	
2005	The Greatest Holiday Classics	Kenny G	
2005	It's Time	Michael Bublé	
2006	Amore	Andrea Bocelli	
2006	Awake	Josh Groban	
2006	Cool Yule	Bette Midler	
2006	The Essential Kenny G	Kenny G	
2006	The Greatest Songs of the Fifties	Barry Manilow	
2006	I'm in the Mood for Love...The Most Romantic Melodies of All Time	Kenny G	
2006	My Destiny/Somewhere Over the Rainbow	Katharine McPhee	
2006	Under the Desert Sky	Andrea Bocelli	
2007	The Best of Andrea Bocelli: Vivere	Andrea Bocelli	
2007	Love Songs	Natalie Cole	
2007	Lyrically, Alan Bergman	Alan Bergman	
2007	Noël	Josh Groban	
2008	Beyond	William Joseph	
2008	Doc Goes To Hollywood	Doc Kupka	
2009	Believe	Katherine Jenkins	
2009	A Body of Work	Paul Anka	
2009	Change Is Now: Renewing America's Promise	Various Artists	
2009	Crazy Love	Michael Bublé	
2009	I Look to You	Whitney Houson	
2009	Love Is the Answer	Barbra Streisand	
2009	Make It Christmas	Rodney Carrington	
2009	My Christmas	Andrea Bocelli	
2009	The Perfect Gift	The Canadian Tenors	
2010	Color	Stephan Moccio	
2010	Due Voci	Due Voci	
2010	Everything Changed	John Keane	
2010	Il Volo	Il Volo	
2010	Luis Miguel	Luis Miguel	
2010	Mademoiselle Zhivago	Lara Fabian	
2010	Patrizio	Patrizio Buanne	
2010	Seal 6: Commitment	Seal	
2011	Christmas	Michael Bublé	
2011	Christmas Favorites	Il Volo	
2011	Concerto: One Night in Central Park	Andrea Bocelli	
2011	Dream With Me	Jackie Evancho	
2011	Romantic Journey	Nikolay Baskov	
2011	Songs of December	Paul Anka	
2011	What Matters Most	Barbra Streisand	
2012	Impressions	Chris Botti	
2012	La Luce: Sumi Jo Sings Igor Krutoy	Sumi Jo	
2012	Merry Christmas, Baby	Rod Stewart	
2012	Lead With Your Heart	The Canadian Tenors	
2012	Songs from the Silver Screen	Jackie Evancho	
2012	Still in My Heart	Jennifer Crestol	
2012	We Are Love	Il Volo	
2013	All That Echoes	Josh Groban	
2013	Cody Karey	Cody Karey	
2013	Loved Me Back to Life	Celine Dion	
2013	A Mary Christmas	Mary J. Blige	
2013	Celtic Thunder: Mythology	Celtic Thunder	
2013	Passione	Andrea Bocelli	
2013	To Be Loved	Michael Bublé	
2014	Aretha Franklin Sings the Great Diva Classics	Aretha Franklin	
2014	Holiday Wishes	Idina Menzel	
2014	Partners	Barbra Streisand	
2015	Cinema	Andrea Bocelli	
2015	El Amor	Gloria Trevi	
2015	L'amore si muove	Il volo	
2015	Stages	Josh Groban	
2015	Under One Sky	The Canadian Tenors	
2015	Wallflower	Diana Krall	
2015	We Love Disney	Various Artists	
2016	Encore: Movie Partners Sing Broadway	Barbra Streisand	
2016	Nobody but Me	Michael Bublé	
2018	Walls	Barbra Streisand	
2020	Eleven Words	David Foster	
2023	Innocence	Kenny G	

=== Songs ===
==== As arranger ====
Year	Title	Artist(s)	Album	Source
1992	"Me"	Meryl Streep	Death Becomes Her soundtrack	
1992	"Run to You"	Whitney Houston	The Bodyguard soundtrack	
1993	Theme to Star Trek: Deep Space Nine	Dennis McCarthy		
1994	"Dream Away"	Babyface; Lisa Stansfield	The Pagemaster soundtrack	
1995	"Why Does It Hurt So Bad"	Whitney Houston	Waiting to Exhale soundtrack	
1996	"The Power of the Dream"	Celine Dion		
1996	"Someday"	All-4-One	The Hunchback of Notre Dame: An Original Walt Disney Records Soundtrack	
1998	"The Prayer"	Celine Dion; Andrea Bocelli	Quest for Camelot: Music from the Motion Picture	
1998	"When You Believe"	Whitney Houston; Mariah Carey	The Prince of Egypt soundtrack	
1999	"Music of My Heart"	Gloria Estefan; NSYNC	Music of the Heart soundtrack	
2000	"I Don't Know How I Got By"	Edwin McCain	The Family Man soundtrack	
2001	"For Always"	Lara Fabian; Josh Groban	A.I. Artificial Intelligence - Music from the Motion Picture	
2004	"Believe"	Josh Groban	The Polar Express soundtrack	
2004	"When Christmas Comes to Town"	Matthew Hall; Meagan Moore	The Polar Express soundtrack	
2004	"Remember Me"	Josh Groban; Tanja Tzarovska	Troy: Music from the Motion Picture	
2005	"Heart of America"	Wynonna Judd; Michael McDonald; Terry Dexter; Eric Benét	Hurricane Relief: Come Together Now	
2009	"God Bless Us Everyone"	Andrea Bocelli	A Christmas Carol Soundtrack	
2010	"I Believe"	Nikki Yanofsky	I Believe/J'imagine - CTV's 2010 Winter Games Theme Song EP	
2011	"I'm Here (A Song for Canada)"	Chantal Kreviazuk		
2021	"Gary's Song"	Kenny G	The SpongeBob Movie: Sponge on the Run Soundtrack	
2024	"Love Will Survive"	Barbra Streisand		

==== As orchestrator ====
Year	Title	Artist(s)	Album	Source
2011	Theme for Rogers Sports Network			

==== As producer ====
Year	Title	Artist(s)	Album	Source
2009	"Unusual Way"	Nicole Kidman	Nine Soundtrack	
2012	"What A Wonderful World"	Dwayne Johnson	Journey 2: The Mysterious Island Soundtrack	

== Accolades ==
=== Annie Awards ===
Year	Nominated work	Category	Result	Source
2009	The Tale of Despereaux	Best Music in an Animated Feature Production	Nominated	

=== BMI Film & TV Awards ===
Year	Nominated work	Category	Result
2005	Ladder 49	BMI Film Music Award	Won
1995	The Little Rascals	BMI Film Music Award	Won

=== Emmy Awards ===
Year	Nominated work	Category	Result
2015	Away and Back	Outstanding Music Composition for a Limited Series, Movie or a Special (Original Dramatic Score)	Nominated
2014	Barbra Streisand: Back to Brooklyn	Outstanding Music Direction	Nominated
2014	86th Academy Awards	Outstanding Music Direction	Nominated
2013	85th Academy Awards	Outstanding Music Direction	Nominated
2011	83rd Annual Academy Awards	Outstanding Music Direction	Nominated
2009	81st Academy Awards: Hugh Jackman Opening Number	Outstanding Original Music and Lyrics	Won
2009	Streisand: The Concert	Outstanding Music Direction	Won
2007	79th Academy Awards	Outstanding Music Direction	Won
1991	Tiny Toon Adventures: "Fields of Honey"	Outstanding Music Direction and Composition	Won

=== Gemini Awards ===
Year	Nominated work	Category	Result	Source
1993	Golden Fiddles	Best Original Music Score for a Program or Mini-Series	Nominated	

=== Grammy Awards ===
Year	Title	Artist	Category	Result
2012	"The Windmills of Your Mind"	Sting	Best Instrumental Arrangement Accompanying Vocalist(s)	Nominated
2000	"The Prayer"	Celine Dion, Andrea Bocelli	Best Instrumental Arrangement Accompanying Vocalist(s)	Nominated

=== International Film Music Critics Association Awards ===
Year	Nominated work	Category	Result	Source
2012	A Very Harold & Kumar 3D Christmas	Best Original Score for a Comedy Film	Nominated	

=== Online Film & Television Association Awards ===
Year	Nominated work	Category	Result
2014	86th Academy Awards	Best Music in a Non-Series	Nominated
2001	Life with Judy Garland: Me and My Shadows	Best Music in a Motion Picture or Miniseries	Nominated
2001	Life with Judy Garland: Me and My Shadows	Best New Theme Song in a Motion Picture of Miniseries	Nominated
