= New Standards (Kenny G album) =

Studio album by Kenny G
- Released: December 3, 2021
- Genre: Soft jazz; traditional pop
- Length: 56:24
- Language: English
- Label: Concord Music Group
- Producer: Kenny G

Kenny G chronology
Brazilian Nights (2015)	New Standards (2021)	Innocence (2023)

[I] really wanted to see if I could explore the vibe of these really old classic jazz standards, which have more complex chords, they’re more jazz chords. They’re not the easier pop chords that I’ve used in the past—and not because I label them that, I just don’t know how else to describe them. But let’s just say, there are just certain chords that are just less complicated. And I didn’t make that choice, it’s just that’s the way I wrote my songs. This one I really wanted to go into the more complicated jazz chords for the songs, but I also wanted to make up the melodies myself. So, I wanted to do what we call the old standards but I wanted to do them with brand new songs. So, that’s why I call it New Standards. I’m trying to capture the romance, the complexity, the sophistication of those old jazz ballads but I wanted to do it with my melodies and playing the structure of the song my way. So, that was the whole idea.

—Kenny G on recording New Standards

New Standards is the eighteenth studio album by American soft jazz saxophonist Kenny G, released on December 3, 2021, through Concord.

== Reception ==
Editors at AllMusic rated this album 4 out of 5 stars, with critic Matt Collar writing that "Kenny G wryly inserts himself into the pantheon of American Popular Songbook composers performing and writing songs that feel as if they were written during the heyday of traditional pop in the '50s and '60s", featuring "hushed and intimate ballads with just enough R&B keyboard, bass, and guitar textures to keep things contemporary" that "capture[s] the sound of traditional pop". Sebastian Scotney of The Arts Desk rated this album 1 out of 5 stars, writing that Kenny G's improvisation shows "sameness" and this music is inferior to jazz giants like Stan Getz. In DownBeat, John McDonough gave New Standards 3 out of 5 stars, writing that this music has the "restful sensibility of the sound of" 1950s and 1960s jazz, continuing that "there is really nothing to dislike or deride about New Standards". Writing for PopMatters, Will Layman took the opportunity to listen to this album and watch the documentary Listening to Kenny G to discuss superficial art, characterizing this as "innocuous background music" and the album features "performances [that] are devoid of swing, polyrhythm, jazz harmony, communication among bandmates in the moment, the individual daring of improvisation, and interaction with music history".

== Track listing ==
1. "Emeline" (Kenny G and Sam Hirsh) – 3:40
2. "Only You" (Walter Afanasieff, Kenny G, and Sam Hirsh) – 5:50
3. "Paris by Night" (Afanasieff, Kenny G, and Hirsh) – 5:30
4. "Rendezvous" (Afanasieff, Kenny G, and Hirsh) – 6:19
5. "Legacy" (Kenny G and Randy Waldman) – 3:56
6. "Anthem" (Kenny G and Hirsh) – 4:32
7. "Blue Skies" (Kenny G and Waldman) – 4:48
8. "Milestones" (Kenny G and Hirsh) – 4:42
9. "Two of a Kind" (Kenny G) – 5:49
10. "Moonlight" (Walter Afanasieff and Kenny G) – 6:00
11. "Waltz in Blue" (Kenny G and Hirsh) – 5:18

== Personnel ==
- Kenny G – soprano saxophone (1, 3, 5–7, 9, 11), tenor saxophone (2, 4, 8–10), alto saxophone (10)
- Sam Hirsh – acoustic piano (1, 3, 4, 6, 8, 9, 11)
- Mary Webster – orchestral programming (1–5, 7–11)
- Greg Phillinganes – keyboards (2–4, 6–9, 11)
- Randy Waldman – acoustic piano (2, 5, 7), arrangements (2, 7)
- Walter Afanasieff – keyboards (10), drum sequencing (10)
- John Raymond – arch top guitar (1), acoustic nylon guitar (5, 9), guitar (6, 7)
- Larry Koonse – guitar (2, 7)
- Nate Light – bass (1, 3, 4, 6, 8, 9, 11)
- Carlitos Del Puerto – bass (2, 5, 7)
- Rick Montalbano – drums (1, 6, 8, 11)
- Dave Tull – drums (2, 7)
- Charles Ruggiero – drums (3, 4)
- Daniel Bejarano – drums (5, 9)
- Ron Powell – percussion (2–9, 11)
- Jochem van der Saag – sample programming of Stan Getz tenor saxophone (5)
- Stephen Erdody – cello (6)
- William Ross – orchestral arrangements (1–5, 7–11)
- Zachariah Rose – score coordinator (1–5, 7–11)

=== Production ===
- Kenny G – producer, arrangements, liner notes
- Steve Shepherd – recording, mixing
- Simon Rhodes – string recording (1–5, 7–11) at Air Lyndhurst Hall (London, England, UK)
- Robert Vosgien – mastering at Robert Vosgien Mastering (Burbank, California)
- Carrie Smith – art direction, design
- Tommy Steele – art direction, design
- Art Streiber – photography
- Danny Nozell – management
- Steve Ross – management
- CTK Enterprises – management company

== See also ==
- 2021 in American music
- List of 2021 albums
