= Slip of the tongue (disambiguation) =

A slip of the tongue is a speech error in which the speaker accidentally misspeaks words other than those intended.

Slip of the tongue can also refer to:

== Music ==
- Slip of the Tongue, a 1989 album by the British hard rock band Whitesnake
- Slip of the Tongue, a 2020 album by Irish singer Imelda May
- "Slip of the Tongue", a song on the 1985 album Nightshift by the Commodores
- "Slip of the Tongue", a song on the 1988 album House of Lords, by House of Lords
- "Slip of the Tongue", a song on the 1989 album Wake Me When It's Over by Faster Pussycat
- "Slip of the Tongue", a song on the 2001 album In America by saxophonist Kenny G
- "Slip of the Tongue", a 2009 song by Slovak twin pop duo Twiins

== Other uses ==
- Freudian slip, an unconsciously motivated wish expressed in error
- "Slip of the Tongue", episode 1 of season 2 of the TV series Californication (September 2008)
- Slip of the Tongue (play), a play performed by Steppenwolf Theatre Company in 1992 starring John Malkovich
