= Montage (Kenny G album) =

Compilation album by Kenny G
- Released: 1990
- Genre: Jazz
- Label: BMG

Kenny G chronology
The Collection (1990)	Montage (1990)	Breathless (1992)

Professional ratings
Review scores
Source	Rating
Allmusic	3/5 stars

Montage is the second compilation album by saxophonist Kenny G, released by BMG in 1990.

== Track listing ==
1. "Songbird" – 5:03
2. "Tradewinds" – 4:09
3. "Tribeca" – 4:38
4. "Virgin Island" – 3:14
5. "I've Been Missin' You" – 4:15
6. "Uncle Al" – 4:32
7. "What Does It Take (To Win Your Love)" – 4:06
8. "Silhouette" (single version) – 4:26
9. "Midnight Motion" – 4:08
10. "Against Doctor's Orders" – 4:06
11. "Hi, How Ya Doin'?" – 5:37
12. "Sade" – 4:20
13. "Going Home" (single version) – 4:12
14. "We've Saved the Best for Last" (feat. Smokey Robinson) – 4:19

== Certifications ==
Region	Certification	Certified units/sales
Australia (ARIA)	Gold	35,000^{^}
Brazil (Pro-Música Brasil)	Gold	100,000^{*}
Japan (RIAJ)	Gold	100,000^{^}
^{*} Sales figures based on certification alone.^{^} Shipments figures based on certification alone.
