= Best (Kenny G album) =

Live album by Kenny G
- Released: February 16, 2006
- Genre: Jazz
- Label: Sony BMG
- Producers: Walter Afanasieff; Michael Bolton; Dan Shea; Peter Bunetta; Rick Chudacoff; Kenny G; Preston Glass; Jeff Magid

Kenny G chronology
The Essential Kenny G (2006)	Best (2006)	The Holiday Collection (2006)

Best is the second live album performed by saxophonist Kenny G, featuring a very similar track listing to The Essential Kenny G. The only difference is Track 15, which is a Mandarin version of "Be My Lady", replacing "Have Yourself a Merry Little Christmas". It was released by Sony BMG in 2006.

== Track listing ==
1. "Songbird" - 5:03
2. "Sade" - 4:20
3. "Slip Of The Tongue" - 4:53
4. "Don't Make Me Wait For Love" - 4:03
5. "Silhouette"5:29
6. "Against Doctor's Orders" - 4:45
7. "What Does It Take (To Win Your Love)" - 4:08
8. "Brazil" - 4:38
9. "Theme from Dying Young" - 4:01
10. "We've Saved the Best for Last" - 4:20
11. "Forever in Love" - 5:00
12. "Midnight Motion (Live)" - 8:23
13. "By the Time This Night Is Over (Best)" - 4:24
14. "Loving You" - 3:20
15. "Be My Lady (Mandarin Version)" - 4:57
16. "Sentimental" - 6:35

== Charts ==
=== Weekly charts ===
Chart (2006)	Peak position
Malaysian International Albums (RIM)	7
