= The Very Best of Kenny G =

Greatest hits album by Kenny G
- Released: May 9, 1994
- Genre: Jazz
- Length: 64:43
- Label: Arista

Kenny G chronology
Miracles: The Holiday Album (1994)	The Very Best of Kenny G (1994)	The Moment (1996)

The Very Best of Kenny G is the third greatest hits album by saxophonist Kenny G. It was released by Arista Records in 1994.

== Track listing ==
1. "Forever in Love" - 4:57
2. "Waiting for You" - 4:59
3. "By the Time This Night Is Over" - 4:46
4. "Jasmine Flower" - 4:36
5. "Theme from Dying Young" - 4:00
6. "Uncle Al" - 4:35
7. "Going Home" - 5:28
8. "Silhouette" - 4:30
9. "Against Doctor's Orders" - 4:06
10. "We've Saved the Best for Last" - 4:19
11. "Sade" - 4:18
12. "Midnight Motion" - 4:07
13. "Don't Make Me Wait for Love" - 4:45
14. "Songbird" - 3:59

== Charts ==
=== Weekly charts ===
Weekly chart performance for The Very Best of Kenny G
Chart (1994)	Peak position
Hungarian Albums (MAHASZ)	25
