= The Moment (Kenny G album) =

Studio album by Kenny G
- Released: October 1, 1996
- Recorded: 1996
- Studio: Studio G (Seattle, Washington); Skywalker Ranch (Marin County, California); Signet Sound Studios (Los Angeles, California)
- Genre: Smooth jazz
- Length: 64:46
- Label: Arista
- Producer: Kenny G; Walter Afanasieff; Babyface

Kenny G chronology
The Very Best of Kenny G (1994)	The Moment (1996)	Six of Hearts (1997)

Professional ratings
Review scores
Source	Rating
AllMusic	4/5 stars
Chicago Tribune	1.5/4 stars
Entertainment Weekly	B
Los Angeles Times	2/4 stars

The Moment is the eighth studio album by American saxophonist Kenny G. It was released by Arista Records in 1996, and reached number 1 on the Billboard Top Contemporary Jazz Albums chart, number 2 on the Billboard 200, number 9 on the Top R&B/Hip-Hop Albums chart and number 16 on the Canadian Albums Chart.

The second single taken from this album, "Havana", was remixed and released to dance clubs in the United States, and these remixes went to number 1 on the Hot Dance Club Play chart in 1997, earning Kenny G his first number 1 on this chart. The remixes were by Todd Terry and Tony Moran.

== Track listing ==
1. "The Moment" (Kenny G) – 6:02
2. "Passages" (Kenny G) – 5:57
3. "Havana" (Kenny G/Walter Afanasieff) – 7:22
4. "Always" (Kenny G) – 5:35
5. "That Somebody Was You" (with Toni Braxton) (Kenny G/Babyface/Walter Afanasieff) – 5:02
6. "The Champion's Theme" (Kenny G/Walter Afanasieff) – 4:21
7. "Eastside Jam" (Kenny G) – 5:09
8. "Moonlight" (Kenny G/Walter Afanasieff) – 5:59
9. "Gettin' On The Step" (Kenny G/Walter Afanasieff) – 4:17
10. "Every Time I Close My Eyes" (with Babyface) (Babyface) – 4:58
11. "Northern Lights" (Kenny G/Walter Afanasieff) – 5:01
12. "Innocence" (Kenny G/Walter Afanasieff) – 3:58

International editions include one bonus track, the Tony Moran remix of "Havana". The bonus track on Asian editions is "Remember"

== Personnel ==
Musicians

- Kenny G – all other instruments (1, 2, 4, 7), soprano saxophone (1–7, 9, 10, 12), alto saxophone (8), tenor saxophone (11), bass (11), drums (11)
- Walter Afanasieff – keyboards (3, 5, 6, 8, 11), all other instruments (5, 6, 8), acoustic piano (9), bass (9, 11), drums (9, 11), guitars (12)
- Dan Shea – keyboards (5), drum programming (5), rhythm programming (5)
- Babyface – keyboards (10), drum programming (10)
- Greg Phillinganes – acoustic piano (10)
- Michael Thompson – guitars (1–11)
- Nathan East – bass (10)
- Paulinho da Costa – percussion (1–9, 11)
- Sheila E – percussion (10)
- William Ross – string arrangements (1, 3, 6, 8, 12)
- Chris Bordman – string arrangements (2, 11)

Vocalists

- Toni Braxton – lead and backing vocals (5)
- Babyface – backing vocals (5, 10), lead vocals (10)
- Marc Nelson – backing vocals (5)
- DeDe O'Neal – backing vocals (5)

== Production ==
- Kenny G – producer
- Walter Afanasieff – producer (3, 5, 6, 8, 11)
- Babyface – producer (5, 10)
- Steve Shepherd – engineer (1–4, 6, 7, 9, 11, 12), additional engineer (8)
- Brad Gilderman – vocal engineer (5), engineer (10)
- Dana Jon Chappelle – additional engineer (3, 12), engineer (5, 8), string recording (8)
- Johnny Richards – string recording (2, 4, 11)
- Humberto Gatica – string recording (3, 12)
- Mick Guzauski – mixing
- Angelo Skouras – design
- Matthew Rolston – photography
- Dennis Turner – management for Turner Management Group, Inc.

== Charts ==
Chart (1996)	Peak position
Taiwanese International Albums (IFPI)	1

== Singles ==
Year	Title	Chart positions			
Year	Title	US AC	US R&B	US Hot 100	US Dance
1996	"The Moment"	16	62	63	—
1997	"Havana"	10	—	66	1

== Certifications and Sales ==
Region	Certification	Certified units/sales
Australia (ARIA)	Gold	35,000^{^}
Brazil (Pro-Música Brasil)	Gold	100,000^{*}
Canada (Music Canada)	2× Platinum	200,000^{^}
Japan (RIAJ)	Platinum	200,000^{^}
New Zealand (RMNZ)	Gold	7,500^{^}
Spain (Promusicae)	Platinum	100,000^{^}
United Kingdom (BPI)	Gold	100,000^{^}
United States (RIAA)	4× Platinum	4,000,000^{^}
Summaries
Asia Pacific	—	1,500,000
^{*} Sales figures based on certification alone.^{^} Shipments figures based on certification alone.
