= The Romance of Kenny G =

Compilation album by Kenny G
- Released: September 1, 2004
- Genre: Jazz
- Length: 59:54
- Label: Green Hill Productions
- Producer: Kenny G

Kenny G chronology
Ultimate Kenny G (2003)	The Romance of Kenny G (2004)	At Last...The Duets Album (2004)

The Romance of Kenny G is the fourth compilation album by saxophonist Kenny G. It was released by Arista Records in 2004.

== Track listing ==
1. "Everlasting"
2. "Going Home"
3. "Forever in Love"
4. "Silhouette"
5. "Northern Lights"
6. "Gettin' on the Step"
7. "The Look of Love"
8. "Moonlight"
9. "My Heart Will Go On"
10. "Songbird"
11. "The Moment"
12. "Peace"
