= The Collection (Kenny G album) =

Compilation album by Kenny G
- Released: 1990
- Genre: Jazz
- Label: BMG

Kenny G chronology
Kenny G Live (1989)	The Collection (1990)	Montage (1990)

Professional ratings
Review scores
Source	Rating
Allmusic	3/5 stars

The Collection is the first compilation album by saxophonist Kenny G, released by BMG in 1990.

== Track listing ==
1. "Songbird"
2. "Tradewinds"
3. "Silhouette"
4. "Don't Make Me Wait for Love" (Live) feat. Michael Bolton
5. "Midnight Motion"
6. "Against Doctor's Orders"
7. "Going Home"
8. "What Does It Take (To Win Your Love)"
9. "Pastel"
10. "Uncle Al"
11. "We've Saved the Best for Last"
12. "Last Night of the Year"
13. "You Make Me Believe"
14. "Let Go"

== Certifications ==
Region	Certification	Certified units/sales
Norway (IFPI Norway)	Gold	25,000^{*}
^{*} Sales figures based on certification alone.
