= The Holiday Collection =

Compilation album by Kenny G
- Released: June 13, 2006
- Genre: Smooth jazz, Christmas
- Length: 37:38
- Label: Arista
- Producer: Kenny G

Kenny G chronology
Best (2006)	The Holiday Collection (2006)	I'm in the Mood for Love...The Most Romantic Melodies of All Time (2006)

The Holiday Collection is the fifth compilation album by saxophonist Kenny G. It was released by Arista Records in 2006, and peaked at number 1 on the Contemporary Jazz chart, number 40 on the R&B/Hip-Hop Albums chart and number 85 on the Billboard 200.

== Track listing ==
CD
No.	Title	Writer(s)	Length
1.	"Santa Claus Is Coming to Town"	John Frederick Coots; Haven Gillespie	3:53
2.	"Sleigh Ride"	Leroy Anderson	3:47
3.	"Let It Snow! Let It Snow! Let It Snow!"	Jule Styne; Sammy Cahn	3:09
4.	"Northern Lights"	Kenny G; Walter Afanasieff	5:01
5.	"Silver Bells"	Jay Livingston	4:00
6.	"The Chanukah Song"	Kenny G; Walter Afanasieff	2:31
7.	"Greensleeves (What Child Is This?)"	Traditional	3:29
8.	"The Joy of Life"	Kenny G	4:20
9.	"Champagne"	Kenny G; Kenneth McDougald	4:46
10.	"Last Night of the Year"	Kenny G; Peter Scherer	2:42
Total length:			37:38
