= Classics in the Key of G =

Studio album by Kenny G
- Released: June 28, 1999
- Studios: The Village Recorder and Record Plant (Los Angeles, California); Capitol Studios and Ocean Way Recording (Hollywood, California); The Enterprise and O'Henry Sound Studios (Burbank, California); Sony Pictures Studios and Sony Scoring Stage (Culver City, California); Chartmaker Studios (Malibu, California); WallyWorld Studios (Marin County, California); The Hit Factory (New York City, New York)
- Genre: Jazz
- Length: 55:27
- Label: Arista
- Producers: Kenny G; Walter Afanasieff; David Foster

Kenny G chronology
Greatest Hits (1997)	Classics in the Key of G (1999)	Faith: A Holiday Album (1999)

Classics in the Key of G is the first cover album and ninth album by saxophonist Kenny G. It was released by Arista Records on June 28, 1999, and reached number 1 on the Contemporary Jazz Albums chart, number 13 on the Internet Albums chart, number 17 on the Billboard 200 and number 27 on the R&B/Hip-Hop Albums chart.

The cover version of Louis Armstrong's "What a Wonderful World" combined Kenny G's saxophone playing with Armstrong's archived vocals. The single reached number 22 on the US Adult Contemporary chart in September 1999. Music critics were horrified at the presumption of Kenny G equating himself with the iconic jazz giant, appropriating his legacy in the manner of white musicians adapting and commercializing the work of black musicians, which has happened for many years in the United States. Jazz guitarist Pat Metheny was appalled, writing a lengthy diatribe on his website, later deleted, saying that the combination of Kenny G and Amstrong was "musical necrophilia". Metheny's views were shared widely among jazz circles. In his defense, Kenny G said that his fans "have no idea about Armstrong" which gave him the idea of educating them. Jazz saxophonist Charles McPherson agreed that Kenny G's fans probably do not know about Armstrong, but he said Armstrong's body of work does not need any validation from Kenny G.

== Track listing ==
1. "Summertime" (featuring George Benson) (George Gershwin, Ira Gershwin) - 6:46
2. "The Look of Love" (Burt Bacharach, Hal David) - 5:32
3. "What a Wonderful World" (Lead vocal: Louis Armstrong) (George David Weiss, Robert Thiele) - 3:03
4. "Desafinado" (Antonio Carlos Jobim, Newton Mendonça) - 5:52
5. "In a Sentimental Mood" (Duke Ellington, Manny Kurtz, Irving Mills) - 4:56
6. "The Girl from Ipanema" (Lead vocal: Bebel Gilberto) (Antonio Carlos Jobim, Norman Gimbel, Vinícius de Moraes) - 4:17
7. "Stranger on the Shore" (Acker Bilk, Robert Mellin) - 3:09
8. "Body and Soul" (Edward Heyman, Frank Eyton, Johnny Green, Robert Sour) - 7:20
9. "'Round Midnight" (Bernie Hanighen, Cootie Williams, Thelonious Monk) - 6:26
10. "Over the Rainbow/ The Girl from Ipanema (Instrumental)" (E.Y. "Yip" Harburg, Harold Arlen / Antonio Carlos Jobim, Norman Gimbel, Vinícius de Moraes) - 7:49

== Personnel ==
- Kenny G – soprano saxophone (1, 3, 5, 7, 9, 10), tenor saxophone (2, 4, 6, 8)
- Greg Phillinganes – Fender Rhodes (1, 2, 4, 5, 8, 9)
- Randy Waldman – acoustic piano (1, 2, 4, 5, 8, 9)
- David Foster – keyboards (3)
- Felipe Elgueta – synthesizer programming (3)
- Walter Afanasieff – keyboards (6, 7), synthesizers (6, 7), programming (6, 7), acoustic piano (10)
- Greg Bieck – additional keyboards (6), additional synthesizers (6), additional programming (6), programming (7)
- Adam Rossi – additional programming (7)
- George Benson – guitar (1), guitar intro (1)
- Dean Parks – acoustic guitar (4)
- Nathan East – bass (1, 2, 4, 5, 8)
- Ricky Lawson – drums (1, 2, 4, 5, 8, 9)
- David Reitzas – drum programming (3)
- Paulinho da Costa – percussion (1, 2, 4, 5, 8, 9)
- Jeremy Lubbock – orchestration and conductor (1, 9)
- Jules Chakin – orchestra contractor (1, 9))
- William Ross – orchestration and conductor (2–8, 10)
- Patti Zimmitti – orchestra contractor (2–8, 10)

== Production ==
- Kenny G – producer and arrangements
- Walter Afanasieff – producer and arrangements (1, 2, 4–10)
- David Foster – producer and arrangements (3)
- Humberto Gatica – mixing (1–5, 7–10), recording (1, 2, 4, 5, 7–10), string recording (3)
- David Reitzas – recording (1, 6), additional recording (2, 4), mixing (6)
- Felipe Elgueta – recording (3)
- John Richards – recording (6)
- Steve Shepherd – recording (7)
- David Gleeson – additional recording (1), recording (6, 7)
- Mike Butler – assistant engineer (1–5, 7–10)
- Andy Haller – assistant engineer (1–5, 7–10)
- Cristian Robles – assistant engineer (1–5, 7–10)
- Mike Scotella – assistant engineer (1)
- Christine Sirois – assistant engineer (1, 2, 4, 5, 8, 9)
- Dann Thompson – assistant engineer (1, 9)
- Peter Doell – assistant engineer (2–5, 7, 10)
- Aaron Lepley – assistant engineer (2, 4)
- Chris Brooke – assistant engineer (3)
- Cristian Gonzalez – assistant engineer (3)
- Ryan Hewitt – assistant engineer (6)
- Pete Krawiec – assistant engineer (6)
- Vlado Meller – mastering at Sony Music Studios (New York, NY)
- Margery Greenspan – art direction
- Jemal Pugh – design
- Jeff Schultz – design
- Lyndie Benson – photography
- William Claxton – photography
- Cory Felman – stylist
- Dennis Turner – management for Turner Management Group, Inc.

== Singles ==
Information taken from this source.

Year	Title	Chart Positions
Year	Title	US Adult Contemporary
1999	"What a Wonderful World"	#22

== Reception ==
Professional ratings
Review scores
Source	Rating
Allmusic	4/5 stars
Entertainment Weekly	D+

The third track features G's music overdubbed on Louis Armstrong's original recording, a move that was criticized by musicians such as Pat Metheny and Richard Thompson, who were angered by what they perceived as arrogance on G's part to use a song by Louis Armstrong for personal gain. Additionally, some versions of the insert booklet of the Arista CD contained an error, attributing the writing of The Look of Love to Sammy Cahn and Jimmy Van Heusen, instead of the correct songwriters, Bacharach and David.

== Certifications and sales ==
Region	Certification	Certified units/sales
Brazil (Pro-Música Brasil)	Gold	100,000^{*}
New Zealand (RMNZ)	Platinum	15,000^{^}
Spain (Promusicae)	Gold	50,000^{^}
United States (RIAA)	Platinum	1,000,000^{^}
^{*} Sales figures based on certification alone.^{^} Shipments figures based on certification alone.
