= I'm in the Mood for Love...The Most Romantic Melodies of All Time =

I'm in the Mood For Love...The Most Romantic Melodies of All Time

Studio album by Kenny G
- Released: November 14, 2006
- Studios: G House Studio (Malibu, California); WallyWorld Studios (Marin County, California); Westlake Studios (Los Angeles, California); Sony Scoring Studios (New York City, New York)
- Genre: Jazz
- Length: 47:57
- Label: Arista
- Producers: Kenny G Walter Afanasieff; Clive Davis

Kenny G chronology
The Holiday Collection (2006)	I'm in the Mood For Love...The Most Romantic Melodies of All Time (2006)	Rhythm & Romance (2008)

Professional ratings
Review scores
Source	Rating
AllMusic	3.5/5 stars

I'm in the Mood For Love...The Most Romantic Melodies of All Time is the third cover album and fourteenth studio album by saxophonist Kenny G. It was released by Arista Records in 2006 and was the last album for the label. The Asian version also includes a bonus track.

The album debuted at number 37 on the United States Billboard 200, selling about 32,000 copies in its first week. As of February, 2008 the album has sold 250,000 copies in the United States. This was also the album's peak position on the chart. It also reached number 1 on the Contemporary Jazz chart and number 22 on the R&B/Hip-Hop Albums chart.

== Track listing ==
1. "You're Beautiful" (Amanda Ghost; James Blunt; Sacha Skarbek) – 4:16
2. "The Way We Were" (Alan Bergman; Marilyn Bergman; Marvin Hamlisch) – 2:53
3. "Yesterday" (John Lennon; Paul McCartney) – 3:03
4. "I'm in the Mood for Love" (Dorothy Fields; Jimmy McHugh) – 4:05
5. "If" (David Gates) – 3:28
6. "The Way You Look Tonight" (Dorothy Fields; Jerome Kern) – 4:17
7. "If I Ain't Got You" (Alicia Keys) – 4:03
8. "Love Theme From "Romeo & Juliet" (Nino Rota) – 3:47
9. "It Had to Be You" (Gus Kahn; Isham Jones) – 3:56
10. "The Shadow of Your Smile" (Johnny Mandel; Paul Francis Webster) – 4:09
11. "Fly Me to the Moon / You Make Me Feel So Young" (Bart Howard / Josef Myrow; Mack Gordon) – 3:34
12. "As Time Goes By" (Herman Hupfeld) – 3:35
13. "You Raise Me Up" (Rolf Løvland; Brendan Graham) – 3:15
14. "The Moon Represents My Heart" (Sun Yi/Weng; Qing Xi) – 3:36 (Teresa Teng)

== Personnel ==
- Kenny G – saxophones
- Walter Afanasieff – keyboard and rhythm programming (1, 2, 5, 8, 13), acoustic piano (3, 4, 6, 7, 9, 10, 12), Hammond B3 organ (7), bass programming (7)
- David Channing – programming (1, 5, 13)
- Thomas "Tawgs" Salter – programming (2, 8)
- Randy Waldman – acoustic piano (11), horn arrangements (11), orchestral and conductor arrangements (11)
- Ramón Stagnaro – nylon guitar (1, 5, 13), guitars (3, 4, 6, 9–12)
- Emerson Swinford – guitars (7)
- Dennis Budimir – guitars (11)
- Dave Stone – bass (3, 4, 6, 10–12)
- Brian Bromberg – bass (9)
- Chuck Berghofer – bass (11)
- Vinnie Colaiuta – drums (3, 4, 6, 10, 12)
- Gregg Bissonette – drums (7, 9)
- Peter Erskine – drums (11)
- Jorge Calandrelli – orchestral arrangements and conductor (2, 3, 9, 10)
- William Ross – orchestral arrangements and conductor (4, 6, 8, 12)
- Gina Zimmitti – orchestral contractor (2–4, 6, 8–12)
- The Music Team – orchestral contracting (2–4, 6, 8–12)

== Production ==
- Pete Ganbarg – A&R
- Clive Davis – album producer
- Kenny G – album producer
- Walter Afanasieff – album producer, producer, arrangements
- David Channing – engineer, Pro Tools engineer (1, 5, 13)
- Steve Shepherd – engineer
- Tyler Gordon – assistant engineer
- Mick Guzauski – mixing (1, 2, 5, 7, 13), additional mixing (3, 4, 6, 9)
- Humberto Gatica – orchestra engineer (2–4, 6, 8–12), mixing (3, 4, 6, 8–12)
- Cristián Robles – mix assistant (3, 4, 6, 8–12)
- Tawgs Salter – Pro Tools engineer (2, 8)
- Vlado Meller – mastering at Sony Music Studios (New York, NY)
- Rich Davis – production coordinator
- Jeri Heiden – art direction, design
- Glen Nakasako – art direction, design
- Lyndie Benson – photography
- Sheryl Lowe – make-up
- Front Line Management – management

== Charts ==
Chart (2006-2007)	Peak position
Australian Albums (ARIA)	145
Malaysian International Albums (RIM)	10
US Billboard 200	37
US Top Contemporary Jazz Albums (Billboard)	1
US Top R&B/Hip-Hop Albums (Billboard)	22
