= Namaste (album) =

- Cover to the American re-release

Studio album by Kenny G and Rahul Sharma
- Released: June 12, 2012
- Studio: Kenny G's Studio, Los Angeles, California, US; Rahul Sharma's Studio, Mumbai, India
- Genre: Jazz; world
- Length: 50:07
- Label: Concord Music Group (American edition)
- Producer: Walter Afanasieff; Marc JB (American edition); Kid Tricky (American edition); Rahul Sharma

Kenny G chronology
Heart and Soul (2010)	Namaste (2012)	Brazilian Nights (2015)

"I took each song as it came. In the west, with jazz you are expected to play these elaborate solos. But in this album it was more organic. I experimented in 20 different ways before I found the right mix. I never thought of merging our sounds when I began. I wanted to place myself in the players' seat and see what comes off it."

—Kenny G on his approach to recording Namase.

Namaste (also known as Namaste, India) is a collaborative studio album by American soft jazz saxophonist Kenny G and Indian musician Rahul Sharma. The album was issued in two different formats in India (2011) and the United States (2012), with elements of both musicians' styles, with original compositions by Sharma that contrast string instruments and woodwind instruments.

== Reception ==
Editors at AllMusic rated this album 3 out of 5 stars, with critic Thom Jurek writing about the American edition "sound[s] geared toward club music as a world fusion exercise throughout" and he praised Sharma's performance, hoping that "Western listeners will take notice of Sharma's talent and become interested enough to seek out the original mix of this record and his other albums to boot". A brief review from Selwyn Harris of Jazzwise scored this album 1 out of 5 stars.

== Track listing ==
All songs written by Rahul Sharma, except where noted.

American edition

1. "Namaste" – 5:26
2. "Brhama-Vishnu-Shiva" – "5:29
3. "Dance of the Elephant God" – 4:54
4. "Lotus Lovers" – 4:57
5. "Transcendental Consciousness" – 5:13
6. "Valley of Flowers" – 5:58
7. "Silsila" (Shiv-Hari) – 6:38
8. "Om Shanti" – 4:10
9. "Transcendental Consciousness" (Walter A Remix) – 3:44
10. "Namaste" (Sould Seekerz Club Remix) – 3:38

== Personnel ==
- Kenny G – soprano saxophone
- Rahul Sharma – santoor, vocals, production, liner notes
- Walter Afanasieff – arrangement, production
- Greg Allen – art direction, design
- Amitabh Bachchan – vocals
- Adrian Bradford – mixing, programming
- Larissa Collins – creative direction
- Tanay Gajjar – mixing
- Tyler Gordon – engineering
- Bernie Grundman – mastering
- Dominick Guillemot – photography
- Marc JB – remixing, additional production (American edition)
- Jatin Kamani – photography
- Kid Tricky – bass guitar, guitar, Fender Rhodes, keyboards, drums, loops, remixing, additional production (American edition)
- Kapil Rege – engineering
- Prasad Sashtey – keyboards, arrangement, programming
- Jackie Vanjari – keyboards, arrangement, programming, sound design

== Chart performance ==
Namaste entered the contemporary jazz charts at first place and the title track reached second place on Billboard's world charts and number 4 on the smooth jazz charts.

== See also ==
- 2012 in American music
- List of 2012 albums
