= Miracles: The Holiday Album =

Studio album by Kenny G
- Released: November 22, 1994
- Recorded: 1994
- Studio: Studio G (Seattle, Washington); Ocean Way Recording (Hollywood, California)
- Genre: Smooth jazz, Christmas
- Length: 35:49
- Label: Arista
- Producer: Kenny G

Kenny G chronology
Breathless (1992)	Miracles: The Holiday Album (1994)	The Very Best of Kenny G (1994)

Professional ratings
Review scores
Source	Rating
Allmusic	3.5/5 stars
Entertainment Weekly	C+

Miracles: The Holiday Album is the first holiday album and seventh studio album by saxophonist Kenny G. It was released by Arista Records on November 22, 1994, and peaked at number 1 on the Billboard 200, Contemporary Jazz Albums and Hot R&B/Hip-Hop Albums charts. It was the overall best-selling Christmas/holiday album in the United States for both 1994 and 1996. It sold 2,987,000 copies in 1994 and 888,000 copies in 1996.

According to Billboard magazine, Miracles: The Holiday Album is the best-selling Christmas/holiday album of the Nielsen SoundScan era of music sales tracking (March 1991 – present). As of November 2014, the album has sold a total of 7,310,000 copies in the U.S. according to SoundScan.

Miracles: The Holiday Album was certified eight-times Platinum by the Recording Industry Association of America for shipment of eight million copies in the United States.

== Track listing (non-US edition) ==
1. "Winter Wonderland" (Felix Bernard/Dick Smith) – 3:03
2. "White Christmas" (Irving Berlin) – 3:02
3. "Have Yourself a Merry Little Christmas" (Hugh Martin/Ralph Blane) – 3:58
4. "The Christmas Song" (Mel Tormé/Robert Wells) – 4:03
5. "Silent Night" (Franz Xaver Gruber, Joseph Mohr) – 3:47
6. "Brahms's Lullaby" (Johannes Brahms) – 3:15
7. "Greensleeves (What Child Is This?) (Traditional)" – 3:29
8. "Miracles" (Kenny G/Walter Afanasieff) – 2:32
9. "Away in a Manger" (James R. Murray) – 2:39
10. "The Chanukah Song" (Kenny G/Walter Afanasieff) – 2:31
11. "Little Drummer Boy" (Katherine K. Davis/Henry Onerati/Harry Simeone) – 4:05
12. "Silver Bells" (Jay Livingston/Ray Evans) – 4:00
13. "Spring Breeze" (Ling-Chiu Lee/Yu-Shian Deng) – 3:20

== Track listing (US edition) ==
1. "Winter Wonderland" – 3:03
2. "White Christmas" – 3:02
3. "Have Yourself a Merry Little Christmas" – 3:58
4. "Silent Night" – 3:47
5. "Greensleeves" – 3:29
6. "Miracles" – 2:32
7. "Little Drummer Boy" – 4:05
8. "The Chanukah Song" – 2:31
9. "Silver Bells" – 4:00
10. "Away in a Manger" – 2:39
11. "Brahms's Lullaby" – 3:15

== Personnel ==
Musicians

- Kenny G – soprano saxophone (1, 2, 4–6, 8–11, 13), tenor saxophone (3, 12), alto saxophone (7)
- Walter Afanasieff – all other instruments (1, 3, 5, 9, 11, 13), acoustic piano (2, 4, 6, 8, 10), keyboards (7), bass (7), drums (7), organ (12)
- Gary Cirimelli – digital programming, Synclavier programming
- Randy Waldman – acoustic piano (12)
- Dann Huff – guitars (12)
- Randy Jackson – bass (12)
- John Robinson – drums (12)

Music arrangements

- Kenny G – arrangements
- Walter Afanasieff – arrangements (1, 3–13)
- Robert Damper – arrangements (2)
- William Ross – string arrangements and conductor (2–4, 6, 8–10)

== Production ==
- Kenny G – producer
- Steve Sheppard – engineer (1–3, 6, 8–10), mixing (13)
- Mick Guzauski – mixing (1–12)
- David Gleeson – engineer (4, 5, 11)
- Dana Jon Chappelle – engineer (7, 12, 13)
- Noel Hazel – assistant engineer (12)
- Humberto Gatica – string recording (2–4, 6, 8–10)
- Bernie Grundman – mastering at Bernie Grundman Mastering (Hollywood, California)
- Christopher Stern – design
- Timothy White – photography
- Turner Management Group, Inc. – management

== Chart positions ==
Chart (1994)	Peak position
Hungarian Albums (MAHASZ)	40
The Billboard 200	1
US Contemporary Jazz Albums (Billboard)	1
US R&B/Hip-Hop Albums (Billboard)	1

== Singles ==
Information taken from this source.

Year	Title	Chart Positions
Year	Title	US Adult Contemporary
1995	"Have Yourself a Merry Little Christmas"	26

== Certifications and Sales ==
Region	Certification	Certified units/sales
Australia (ARIA)	Gold	35,000^{^}
Brazil (Pro-Música Brasil)	Platinum	250,000^{*}
Japan (RIAJ)	Gold	100,000^{^}
New Zealand (RMNZ)	Gold	7,500^{^}
Spain (PROMUSICAE)	Gold	50,000^{^}
United States (RIAA)	8× Platinum	8,000,000^{^}
Summaries
Asia Pacific	—	1,500,000
Worldwide	—	13,000,000
^{*} Sales figures based on certification alone.^{^} Shipments figures based on certification alone.

== See also ==
- List of number-one albums of 1994 (U.S.)
- List of number-one albums of 1995 (U.S.)
- List of number-one R&B albums of 1994 (U.S.)
- List of number-one R&B albums of 1995 (U.S.)
