= Paradise (Kenny G album) =

Studio album by Kenny G
- Released: September 10, 2002
- Studios: Studio G (Seattle, Washington); WallyWorld Studios (Marin County, California); Signet Sound Studios and Westlake Studios (Los Angeles, California); Backroom Studios (Glendale, California); Paramount Studios and Capitol Studios (Hollywood, California); Barking Doctor Recording (Mount Kisco, New York)
- Genre: Smooth jazz
- Length: 52:27
- Label: Arista
- Producers: Kenny G; Walter Afanasieff; Brian McKnight

Kenny G chronology
In America (2001)	Paradise (2002)	Wishes: A Holiday Album (2002)

Professional ratings
Review scores
Source	Rating
Allmusic	3/5 stars
Blender	3/5 stars
Entertainment Weekly	D

Paradise is the eleventh studio album by saxophonist Kenny G. It was released by Arista Records in 2002, and reached number 2 on the Contemporary Jazz Albums chart, number 9 on the Billboard 200 and Internet Albums charts and number 15 on the R&B/Hip-Hop Albums chart.

== Track listing ==
1. "Brazil" (Kenny G/Walter Afanasieff) - 4:37
2. "Paradise" (Kenny G/Walter Afanasieff) - 4:16
3. "Malibu Dreams" (Kenny G/Walter Afanasieff) - 5:07
4. "One More Time" (featuring Chanté Moore) (Walter Afanasieff) - 4:13
5. "Spanish Nights" (Kenny G/Walter Afanasieff) - 6:11
6. "Seaside Jam" (Kenny G/Walter Afanasieff) - 4:52
7. "Ocean Breeze" (Kenny G/Walter Afanasieff) - 4:39
8. "Falling in the Moonlight" (Kenny G/Walter Afanasieff) - 5:15
9. "All the Way" (featuring Brian McKnight) (Brian McKnight) - 4:18
10. "Midnight Magic" (Kenny G/Walter Afanasieff) - 5:17
11. "Peace" (Kenny G/Walter Afanasieff) - 3:43
12. "Harmony" (Kenny G/Walter Afanasieff) - 4:40 (Japan)
13. "Casablanca" (John Healy/Higgins/Limbo) - 4:17 (bonus track)

== Personnel ==
- Kenny G – arrangements (1–3, 5–8, 11), soprano saxophone (1–9, 11), tenor saxophone (10)
- Walter Afanasieff – arrangements (1–8, 10, 11), keyboard and rhythm programming (1–8, 10, 11), Hammond B3 organ (10)
- Josh Binder – programming (1–3, 5–8, 11)
- Frank Maranzino – programming (1–5, 7, 8, 11)
- Brian McKnight – instruments (9), lead and backing vocals (9)
- Greg Phillinganes – keyboards (10)
- Randy Waldman – acoustic piano (10)
- Heitor Pereum – nylon guitar (1)
- Michael Landau – electric guitar (2–4, 6, 8)
- Ramón Stagnaro – nylon guitar (5)
- Phil Upchurch – guitars (10)
- Alex Al – bass (10)
- Donnell Spencer – drums (10)
- Jorge Calandrelli – orchestra arrangements and conductor (1, 11)
- William Ross – orchestra arrangements and conductor (2–8)
- Debbie Datz-Pyle – orchestra contractor (1–8, 11)
- Matthew Dellapolla – orchestra consultant (2, 4, 5)
- Chanté Moore – lead and backing vocals (4)

== Production ==
- Antonio "L.A." Reid – executive producer
- Kenny G – producer (1–3, 5–8, 11), co-producer (9)
- Walter Afanasieff – producer (1–8, 10, 11)
- Brian McKnight – producer (9)
- Humberto Gatica – engineer (1–8, 10, 11), mixing (1, 2, 5–8, 10, 11), orchestra engineer (1–8, 11)
- David Reiztas – engineer (1–5, 8, 11)
- Steve Shepherd – engineer (1–5, 8, 11)
- Nick Thomas – engineer (1–5, 8, 11)
- Al Schmitt – mixing (3)
- Mick Guzauski – mixing (4, 9)
- Chris Wood – engineer (9)
- Chris Brooke – additional engineer (1, 4), assistant mix engineer (1, 2, 5–8, 10, 11), assistant engineer (2, 4, 10)
- Steve Sheppard – additional mixing (2, 5)
- Paul Wertheimer – second engineer (1–8, 11)
- Brian Dixon – assistant engineer (1–8, 10, 11)
- Nick Marshall – assistant engineer (1–5, 7, 8, 11)
- Jason Rankins – assistant engineer (1, 2, 5, 8, 10)
- Tom Bender – assistant mix engineer (4, 9)
- Mary Ann Souza – assistant engineer (9)
- Steve Jenewick – assistant engineer (11)
- Jason Wolmouth – Pro Tools engineer (1–8, 10, 11)
- Bill Smith – Pro Tools engineer (3)
- Norm Dulgatch – technician (1–3, 6–8, 11)
- Dominic Gonzales – stage manager (1–3, 6–8, 11)
- Vlado Meller – mastering at Sony Music Studios (New York City, New York)
- Rich Davis – production coordinator (1–8, 10, 11)
- Joe Mama-Nitzberg – creative director
- Courtney Walter – art direction, design
- Herb Ritts – photography
- Dennis Turner – management for Turner Management Group, Inc.

== Charts ==
=== Weekly charts ===
Chart (2002)	Peak position
US Billboard 200	9
US Top Contemporary Jazz Albums (Billboard)	2
US Top R&B/Hip-Hop Albums (Billboard)	15

=== Year-end charts ===
Chart (2002)	Position
Canadian R&B Albums (Nielsen SoundScan)	64

== Certifications ==
Region	Certification	Certified units/sales
Brazil (Pro-Música Brasil)	Gold	50,000^{*}
United States (RIAA)	Gold	500,000^{^}
^{*} Sales figures based on certification alone.^{^} Shipments figures based on certification alone.
