= At Last...The Duets Album =

Studio album by Kenny G
- Released: November 23, 2004
- Studios: Chalice Recording Studios, Signet Sound Studios and Studio G (Los Angeles, California); Henson Recording Studios, Blakeslee Studios and Paramount Recording Studios (Hollywood, California); The Enterprise (Burbank, California); Hiatus Studios and Sound Decision (New York City, New York); Barking Doctor Recording (Mount Kisco, New York); MixStar Studios (Virginia Beach, Virginia)
- Genre: Smooth jazz
- Length: 54:45
- Label: Arista
- Producers: Walter Afanasieff; Emanuel Kiriakou; Raphael Saadiq

Kenny G chronology
The Romance of Kenny G (2004)	At Last...The Duets Album (2004)	The Greatest Holiday Classics (2005)

Professional ratings
Review scores
Source	Rating
Allmusic	4/5 stars
People	(favourable)

At Last...The Duets Album is the second cover album and thirteenth studio album by saxophonist Kenny G. It was released by Arista Records in 2004, and reached number 1 on the Contemporary Jazz chart, number 21 on the Top R&B/Hip-Hop Albums chart and number 40 on the Billboard 200.

== Track listing ==
1. "(Everything I Do) I Do It for You" - featuring LeAnn Rimes (Bryan Adams/Michael Kamen/Robert John Lange) - 5:04
2. "At Last" - featuring Arturo Sandoval (Harry Warren/Mack Gordon) - 4:06
3. "I Believe I Can Fly" - featuring Yolanda Adams (R. Kelly) - 5:19
4. "Careless Whisper" - featuring Brian McKnight (Andrew Ridgeley/George Michael) - 4:17
5. "Beautiful" - featuring Chaka Khan (Linda Perry) - 5:32
6. "Pick Up the Pieces" - featuring David Sanborn (Alan Gorrie/Owen McIntyre/Roger Ball/Malcolm Duncan/Robbie McIntosh/Hamish Stuart) - 4:13
7. "Baby Come to Me" - featuring Daryl Hall (Rod Temperton) - 3:56
8. "Misty" - featuring Gladys Knight (Johnny Burke/Erroll Garner) - 4:31
9. "Don't Know Why" - featuring David Benoit (Jesse Harris) - 5:08
10. "The Way You Move" - featuring Earth, Wind & Fire (Antwan Patton/Carlton Mahone/Patrick Brown) - 4:41
11. "Sorry Seems to Be the Hardest Word" - featuring Richard Marx (Elton John/Bernie Taupin) - 3:54
12. "Alfie" - featuring Burt Bacharach (Burt Bacharach/Hal David) - 4:10
13. "The Music That Makes Me Dance" - featuring Barbra Streisand (Jule Styne/Bob Merrill) - 4:30

== Personnel ==
- Kenny G – saxophones
- Walter Afanasieff – keyboards (1–5, 7–12), acoustic piano (1–5), rhythm programming (1–5, 7–12), arrangements (1–12), Hammond B3 organ (6, 9, 10)
- Emanuel Kiriakou – programming (1–12), guitars (6), electric guitar (10)
- David Benoit – acoustic piano (9)
- Greg Phillinganes – Fender Rhodes (9)
- T-Bone Wolk – accordion (11)
- Burt Bacharach – acoustic piano (12)
- Michael Lang – acoustic piano (13)
- Michael Landau – electric guitar (1, 3–5, 7, 9), guitars (6)
- Earl Klugh – guitars (4)
- Dean Parks – guitars (13)
- Nathan East – bass (6)
- Abe Laboriel, Jr. – drums (6)
- Vinnie Colaiuta – drums (9)
- Ralph Humphrey – drums (13)
- Peter Michael Escovedo – percussion (10)
- David Sanborn – saxophone (6)
- Gary Bias – saxophone (10)
- Reggie Young – trombone (10)
- Arturo Sandoval – trumpet (2)
- Gary Grant – trumpet (10)
- Jerry Hey – trumpet (10), horn arrangements (10)
- William Ross – string arrangements and conductor (2, 8, 13)
- Jorge Calandrelli – string arrangements and conductor (12)
- Ralph Burns – original Broadway arrangement (13)
- Debbie Datz-Pyle – string contractor (2, 8, 12)
- Patti Zimmitti – string contractor (2, 8, 12)
- LeAnn Rimes – lead vocals (1)
- Yolanda Adams – lead vocals (3)
- Mabvuto Carpenter – backing vocals (3, 7)
- Traci Nelson – backing vocals (3)
- Conshea Owens – backing vocals (3–5, 7)
- Barbara Wilson – backing vocals (3)
- Namiah Wilson – backing vocals (3)
- Brian McKnight – lead vocals (4)
- Clark Anderson – backing vocals (4)
- Chaka Khan – lead vocals (5)
- Dorian Holley – backing vocals (5)
- Darryl Phinnessee – backing vocals (5)
- Daryl Hall – lead vocals (7)
- Gladys Knight – lead vocals (8)
- Philip Bailey – lead vocals (10)
- Maurice White – lead vocals (10)
- Richard Marx – lead vocals (11)
- Barbra Streisand – lead vocals (13)

== Production ==
- Pete Ganbarg – A&R
- Clive Davis – album producer
- Walter Afanasieff – album producer, producer (1–12)
- Jay Landers – executive producer (13)
- Barbra Streisand – executive producer (13), producer (13)
- Emanuel Kiriakou – co-producer (1), engineer (1–12), Pro Tools engineer (1–12)
- Raphael Saadiq – co-producer (10)
- Kenny G – saxophone producer
- Steve Shepherd – engineer (1–12)
- Andy Zulla – mixing (1, 3, 5, 7, 9)
- Serban Ghenea – mixing (2)
- Joel Iwataki – string recording (2, 8)
- Jon Gass – mixing (4, 12)
- Chris Wood – lead vocal recording (4)
- Jonathan Duckett – engineer (6)
- Dave Pensado – mixing (6, 10)
- Mick Guzauski – mixing (8, 11)
- David Reitzas – engineer (13), mixing (13)
- Al Schmitt – engineer (13)
- David Channing – additional engineer (2, 12), engineer (6), horn recording (10)
- Kaspar Hugentobler – assistant engineer (1, 3–7, 9–12)
- Tim Roberts – mix assistant (2)
- Alan Mason – assistant engineer (3, 5, 12)
- Jon Berkowitz – assistant engineer (6)
- Ariel Chobaz – mix assistant (10)
- John Hanes – additional Pro Tools engineer (2)
- Joe Wohlmuth – additional Pro Tools engineer (4, 8)
- Joe Yannece – mastering at Trutrone Mastering Labs (New York, NY)
- Rich Davis – production coordinator
- Chris LeBeau – art department production
- Alexis Yraola – art direction, design
- Andrew MacPherson – photography
- Tunney & Leal – wardrobe styling
- Dennis Turner – management for Turner Management Group, Inc.

== Bonus track listing No. 1 ==
1. "The One and Only - featuring Lee-Hom Wang" (Lee-Hom Wang) - 4:20 (Bonus)
2. "Misty Moon - featuring Lim Hyung Joo" (Lim Hyung Joo/T. Matsumoto) - 4:32 (Bonus)
3. "I Need the Both of You - featuring Tata Young" (Du, Pas Sa/Kamo) - 4:34 (Bonus)
4. "Propose - featuring Tube" (Michiya Haruhata/Nobuteru Maeda) - 5:22 (Bonus)

== Bonus track listing No. 2 ==
1. "January - featuring Glenn Fredly" (Glenn Fredly) - 3:51 (Bonus)

== Bonus track listing No. 3 ==
1. "Right Here Waiting" (Richard Marx) - 4:22 (Bonus)

== Charts ==
Chart (2004)	Peak position
Australian Albums (ARIA)	146
US Billboard 200	40
US Top Contemporary Jazz Albums (Billboard)	1
US Top R&B/Hip-Hop Albums (Billboard)	21

== Singles ==
Information taken from this source.

Year	Title	Chart positions
Year	Title	US AC
2005	"I Believe I Can Fly"	28
2005	"The Way You Move"	12
2005	"(Everything I Do) I Do It For You"	18

== Certifications ==
Region	Certification	Certified units/sales
United States (RIAA)	Gold	500,000^{^}
^{^} Shipments figures based on certification alone.

== Others ==
In Indonesia, a collaboration with the Indonesian singer Glenn Fredly is included on the album. The song "Januari" (January) appears as track 14.
