= Faith: A Holiday Album =

Studio album by Kenny G
- Released: November 16, 1999
- Studios: O'Henry Sound Studios (Burbank, California); Sony Pictures Studios (Culver City, California); Ocean Way Recording (Hollywood, California); WallyWorld Studios (Marin County, California)
- Genres: Smooth jazz; Christmas
- Length: 36:37
- Label: Arista
- Producers: Kenny G; Walter Afanasieff

Kenny G chronology
Classics in the Key of G (1999)	Faith: A Holiday Album (1999)	In America (2000)

Faith: A Holiday Album is the second holiday album and tenth studio album by saxophonist Kenny G. It was released by Arista Records on November 16, 1999, and peaked at number 1 on the Contemporary Jazz Albums chart, number 4 on the R&B/Hip-Hop Albums chart, number 5 on the Internet Albums chart, and number 6 on the Billboard 200. The album also received a Grammy nomination for Best Pop Instrumental Album.

Faith: A Holiday Album was also the best-selling Christmas album of 1999 in the United States according to sales figures from Nielsen/SoundScan, with total sales of 1,575,000 copies that year. As of November 2014, the album has sold 2,750,000 copies in the U.S. according to SoundScan.

On November 5, 2002, Faith: A Holiday Album was certified Triple Platinum by the Recording Industry Association of America for shipments of three million copies in the U.S.

Kenny G's rendition of "Auld Lang Syne" featured guest musicians Yanni on piano and keyboards as well as Charlie Adams on drums.

== Reception ==
Professional ratings
Review scores
Source	Rating
Allmusic	2.5/5 stars
Chicago Tribune	(unfavorable)

== Track listing ==
1. "Let It Snow! Let It Snow! Let It Snow!" (Sammy Cahn/Jule Styne) - 3:08
2. "The First Noel" (William Sandys) - 3:08
3. "I'll Be Home for Christmas" (Kim Gannon/Walter Kent/Buck Ram) - 3:33
4. "Sleigh Ride" (Leroy Anderson/Mitchell Parish) - 3:48
5. "The Christmas Song" (Mel Tormé/Robert Wells) - 4:02
6. "Medley: We Three Kings/Carol of the Bells" (John Henry Hopkins/Mikhail Leontovich/Peter Wilhousky) - 4:07
7. "O Christmas Tree" (Traditional) - 2:39
8. "Santa Claus Is Coming to Town" (J. Fred Coots/Haven Gillespie) - 3:52
9. "Eternal Light (A Chanukah Song)" (Walter Afanasieff/Kenny G) - 2:53
10. "Ave Maria" (Franz Schubert) - 4:30
11. "Auld Lang Syne" (Robert Burns/Traditional) - 4:56
12. "Auld Lang Syne: The Millennium Mix" (Robert Burns/Traditional) - 7:53
13. "Voice" (Bonus track) - 7:53

== Personnel ==
- Kenny G – soprano saxophone (1, 2, 4–7, 9–11), tenor saxophone (3, 8)
- Randy Waldman – acoustic piano (1, 4, 8)
- Greg Phillinganes – Fender Rhodes (1, 4, 8)
- Walter Afanasieff – keyboards (2, 3, 6, 7, 11), synthesizers (2, 3, 6, 7, 11), drum and rhythm programming (2, 3, 6, 7, 11), acoustic piano (5, 9, 10)
- Greg Bieck – digital programming (2, 3, 6, 7, 11), Macintosh programming (2, 3, 6, 7, 11), additional drum and rhythm programming (6, 7, 11)
- Yanni – keyboards (11), acoustic piano (11)
- Nathan East – bass (1, 4, 8)
- Ricky Lawson – drums (1, 4, 8)
- Charlie Adams – drums (11)
- Paulinho da Costa – percussion (1, 4, 8)
- William Ross – orchestra arrangements and conductor (1–7, 9, 10)
- Chris Bordman – orchestra arrangements and conductor (8)
- The Music Team – orchestra contractors (1–7, 9, 10)

== Production ==
- Kenny G – producer, arrangements
- Walter Afanasieff – producer, arrangements
- Humberto Gatica – recording, mixing (1–4, 6–11)
- David Gleeson – recording (2, 3, 6, 7, 9–11), additional recording (5)
- David Frazier – recording (3, 10)
- Mick Guzauski – mixing (5)
- Chris Brooke – assistant engineer (1–4, 6–11)
- Peter Doell – assistant engineer (1–4, 6–11)
- Mark Eshelman – assistant engineer (1–4, 6–11)
- Grant Schmitz – assistant engineer (1–4, 6–11)
- James Stone – assistant engineer (1, 4, 8)
- Kent Matcke – assistant engineer (2, 9)
- Pete Krawiec – assistant engineer (11)
- Vlado Meller – mastering at Sony Music Studios (New York City, New York)
- Margery Greenspan – art direction
- Jeff Schultz – design
- Patrick Demarcheller – photography
- Dennis Turner – management for Turner Management Group, Inc.

== Charts ==
=== Weekly charts ===
Chart (1999–2000)	Peak position
Australian Albums (ARIA)	189
US Billboard 200	6
US Top Jazz Albums (Billboard)	1
US Top R&B/Hip-Hop Albums (Billboard)	4

=== Year-end charts ===
Year-end chart performance for Faith: A Holiday Album
Chart (2000)	Position
US Billboard 200	44
US Top R&B/Hip-Hop Albums (Billboard)	76

Chart (2002)	Position
Canadian R&B Albums (Nielsen SoundScan)	154

== Singles ==
Information taken from this source.

Year	Title	Chart positions						
Year	Title	US Adult Contemporary	US Hot R&B/Hip-Hop Singles & Tracks	US Hot 100	US Adult Top 40	US Hot Country Singles & Tracks	US Top 40 Mainstream	US Top 40 Tracks
1999	"Auld Lang Syne"	3	57	7	15	49	40	30

== Certifications ==
Region	Certification	Certified units/sales
United States (RIAA)	3× Platinum	3,000,000^{^}
^{^} Shipments figures based on certification alone.

== See also ==
- List of Billboard Top Holiday Albums number ones of the 2000s
