= Brazilian Nights =

Studio album by Kenny G
- Released: January 27, 2015
- Recorded: 2014
- Genre: Latin jazz, smooth jazz
- Length: 60:01
- Label: Concord Records
- Producer: Kenny G Walter Afanasieff

Kenny G chronology
Namaste (2012)	Brazilian Nights (2015)	New Standards (2021)

Singles from Brazilian Nights
- 1. "Bossa Réal" Released: November 4, 2014

Professional ratings
Review scores
Source	Rating
Allmusic	3/5 stars

Brazilian Nights is the seventeenth studio album by Kenny G, released on January 27, 2015, his second bossa nova album, following Rhythm & Romance released in 2008, and his first studio album since Heart and Soul (2010).

== Background ==
Kenny G had his inspiration for the album when he was touring and traveling in Brazil, especially in Rio de Janeiro. Explaining this, he said that he loved the Bossa nova genre, the people in Brazil and the nights of dancing and singing. He decided to take the Bossa nova sounds into his new album. The album's deluxe edition also contains 4 live versions of Kenny G's biggest hits, such as "Forever in Love" and "Heart and Soul".

== Track listing ==
No.	Title	Writer(s)	Length
1.	"Bossa Antigua"	Paul Desmond	3:48
2.	"Corcovado (Quiet Nights Of Quiet Stars)"	Antônio Carlos Jobim	7:30
3.	"Bossa Réal"	Walter Afanasieff, Kenny G	7:36
4.	"Brazilian Nights"	Afanasieff, Kenny G	6:32
5.	"April Rain"	Afanasieff, Kenny G	6:48
6.	"Menina Moca"	Luis Antonio	5:57
7.	"Bu Bossa"	Afanasieff, Kenny G	4:25
8.	"Clouds"	Afanasieff, Kenny G	5:37
9.	"Girl From Ipanema"	Vinicius de Moraes, Antônio Carlos Jobim	5:33
10.	"Summer Love"	Afanasieff, Kenny G	6:15
Total length:			01:00:01

== Personnel ==
- Kenny G – alto saxophone (1, 2, 5, 8), soprano saxophone (3, 10), tenor saxophone (4, 6, 7, 9)
- Walter Afanasieff – pianos, synthesizers, drum and percussion programming, orchestra arrangements
- Sam Hirsh – acoustic piano (5)
- Jorge Calandrelli – orchestra arrangements

== Production ==
- Kenny G – producer and arrangements
- Walter Afanasieff – producer and arrangements
- Gordon Lyon – recording engineer
- Adrian Bradford – additional engineer
- Martin Nessi – additional engineer
- Steve Shepherd – additional engineer
- Humberto Gatica – mixing at Lion Share Studios (Los Angeles, California)
- Stephen Marcussen – mastering at Marcussen Mastering (Hollywood, California)
- Todd Gallopo – art direction, design
- Jan Montgomery – design
- Chapman Baehler – photography
- David Paletz – wardrobe design
- Mark Adelman – management for Career Artist Management

== Chart performance ==
The album brought Kenny G back to the Billboard 200 after 5 years. It's also Kenny's eighth No.1 album in the Billboard Jazz Albums.

Chart (2015)	Peak position
U.S. Billboard 200	86
U.S. Billboard Jazz Albums	1
