= Breathless (Kenny G album) =

Studio album by Kenny G
- Released: November 17, 1992
- Recorded: 1992
- Studios: Studio G (Seattle, Washington); The Hit Factory (New York City, New York); The Plant Recording Studios (Sausalito, California); Ocean Way Recording and Devonshire Sound Studios (Hollywood, California)
- Genres: Smooth jazz; middle-of-the-road
- Length: 69:57 (US version); 75:29 (International version)
- Label: Arista
- Producers: Kenny G; Walter Afanasieff; David Foster; Dan Shea

Kenny G chronology
Montage (1990)	Breathless (1992)	Miracles: The Holiday Album (1994)

Singles from Breathless
- 1. "Forever in Love" Released: December 1992; 2. "By the Time This Night Is Over" Released: May 1993; 3. "Sentimental" Released: November 1993

Professional ratings
Review scores
Source	Rating
AllMusic	2.5/5 stars
Entertainment Weekly	D
Music Week	3/5 stars

Breathless is the sixth studio album by American saxophonist Kenny G, released on November 17, 1992, on Arista Records. It reached number 1 on the Contemporary Jazz Albums chart and number 2 on the Billboard 200 and R&B/Hip-Hop Albums charts. The track "Forever in Love" won a Grammy Award for Best Instrumental Composition at the 1994 ceremony and reached number 18 on the Billboard Hot 100.

Despite mixed reviews from critics, the album was still certified Diamond with shipments of 12 million copies in the US, making it one of the best-selling albums in the United States, and the best-selling instrumental album in history.

== Track listing ==
Note: On the Asian edition, "Jasmine Flower" is track 14, omitting "Natural Ride".

All music is composed by Kenny G, unless otherwise indicated below.

No.	Title	Writer(s)	Length
1.	"The Joy of Life"		4:23
2.	"Forever in Love"		5:01
3.	"In the Rain"		5:03
4.	"Sentimental"	Kenny G; Walter Afanasieff	6:38
5.	"By the Time This Night Is Over" (with Peabo Bryson)	Michael Bolton; Diane Warren; Andy Goldmark	4:50
6.	"End of the Night"		5:25
7.	"Alone"		5:28
8.	"Morning"	Kenny G; Afanasieff	5:17
9.	"Even If My Heart Would Break" (with Aaron Neville)	Franne Golde; Adrian Gurvitz	5:01
10.	"G-Bop"	Dan Shea; Kenny G; Afanasieff	4:09
11.	"Sister Rose"	Kenny G; Afanasieff	6:16
12.	"A Year Ago"		5:18
13.	"Homeland"		4:36
14.	"Natural Ride" (International version bonus track)		5:17
15.	"The Wedding Song"	Kenny G; Afanasieff	3:25

== Personnel ==
Musicians

- Kenny G – arrangements, all other instruments (1–3, 6, 7, 12, 13), soprano saxophone (1, 2, 4, 5, 7, 8, 10, 11, 13, 14), alto saxophone (3), drum programming (4, 8), tenor saxophone (6, 9, 12)
- Walter Afanasieff – keyboards (4, 5, 8–11), synth bass (4, 5, 8, 9), arrangements (5), drums (5, 11), rhythm programming (5), all other instruments (5), guitar intro and solo (7), Hammond B3 organ (9), acoustic piano (9, 14), percussion (9, 11), Synclavier (11), acoustic guitar (11), bass (11), cello (11)
- Gary Cirimelli – Macintosh programming (5, 9, 11), Synclavier programming (5, 9, 11)
- Ren Klyce – Akai AX60 programming (5, 9, 11), Synclavier programming (5, 9, 11)
- Dan Shea – keyboards (5, 10), programming (5), rhythm programming (10), synth bass (10)
- Randy Kerber – additional keyboards (9)
- Dean Parks – guitars (1–4, 6–8, 10, 12, 13)
- Michael Thompson – guitars (5, 9)
- Vail Johnson – bass guitar (6)
- John Robinson – drums (9)
- Paulinho da Costa – percussion (1–4, 6–8, 10, 12, 13)
- William Ross – string arrangements and conductor (8, 14)
- David Foster – arrangements (9)
- Peabo Bryson – lead vocals (5)
- Lynn Davis – backing vocals (5, 9, 11)
- Jim Gilstrap – backing vocals (5, 11)
- Portia Griffin – backing vocals (5)
- Pat Hawk – backing vocals (5)
- Phillip Ingram – backing vocals (5, 9, 11)
- Vann Johnson – backing vocals (5)
- Rose Stone – backing vocals (5, 11)
- Fred White – backing vocals (5, 11)
- Jean McLean – backing vocals (9)
- Aaron Neville – lead vocals (9)
- Alex Brown – backing vocals (11)

Production

- Kenny G – producer (1–4, 6–8, 10, 12–14), liner notes
- Walter Afanasieff – producer (5, 9–11)
- David Foster – producer (5, 9)
- Kevin Becka – engineer (1–4, 6–8, 12–14), assistant engineer (5, 9), additional engineer (5, 9)
- Dana Jon Chappelle – engineer (5, 11), additional engineer (9)
- Humberto Gatica – engineer (9)
- Steve Shepherd – assistant engineer (1–9, 12, 14), additional engineer (5, 9), mixing (10)
- David Gleeson – additional engineer (5)
- Jeffrey Woodruff – additional engineer (5)
- Manny LaCarrubba – additional engineer (9), engineer (10), assistant engineer (11)
- John Richards – orchestra engineer (8, 14)
- Eric Rudd – assistant orchestra engineer (8, 14)
- Mick Guzauski – mixing (1–9, 11–14)
- Susan Mendola – design
- Matthew Rolston – photography
- Turner Management Group, Inc. – management

== Charts ==
=== Weekly charts ===
Chart (1992–1996)	Peak position
Australian Albums (ARIA)	1
Canada Top Albums/CDs (RPM)	2
Dutch Albums (Album Top 100)	1
European Albums (European Top 100 Albums)	2
Hungarian Albums (MAHASZ)	12
New Zealand Albums (RMNZ)	1
Spanish Albums (AFYVE)	3
UK Albums (Official Charts)	4
US Billboard 200	2
US Top Contemporary Jazz Albums (Billboard)	1
US Top R&B/Hip-Hop Albums (Billboard)	2

=== Year-end charts ===
1993 year-end chart performance
Chart (1993)	Position
Australian Albums (ARIA)	2
Canada Top Albums/CDs (RPM)	4
Dutch Albums (Album Top 100)	3
European Albums (European Top 100 Albums)	2
New Zealand Albums (RMNZ)	2
Spanish Albums (AFYVE)	2
UK Albums (OCC)	70
US Billboard 200	2
US Top R&B/Hip-Hop Albums (Billboard)	4

1994 year-end chart performance
Chart (1994)	Position
US Billboard 200	11
US Top R&B/Hip-Hop Albums (Billboard)	4

1995 year-end chart performance
Chart (1995)	Position
US Billboard 200	6
US Top R&B/Hip-Hop Albums (Billboard)	11

1996 year-end chart performance
Chart (1996)	Position
US Billboard 200	14

=== End of decade charts ===
Chart (1990–1999)	Position
US Billboard 200	3

=== All-time charts ===
Chart	Position
US Billboard 200	12

== Certifications and sales ==
Region	Certification	Certified units/sales
Australia (ARIA)	3× Platinum	210,000^{^}
Brazil (Pro-Música Brasil)	Platinum	250,000^{*}
Canada (Music Canada)	3× Platinum	300,000^{^}
Germany	—	25,000
Ghana	—	80,000
Ireland	—	80,000
Japan (RIAJ)	Gold	100,000^{^}
Korea	—	≈1,000,000
New Zealand (RMNZ)	Platinum	15,000^{^}
Singapore	—	160,000
Spain (Promusicae)	2× Platinum	200,000^{^}
Taiwan	—	200,000
United Kingdom (BPI)	Platinum	300,000^{^}
United States (RIAA)	12× Platinum	12,000,000^{^}
Summaries
Asia Pacific	—	3,000,000
Worldwide	—	15,000,000
^{*} Sales figures based on certification alone.^{^} Shipments figures based on certification alone.

== See also ==
- List of best-selling albums in the United States
