= Wishes: A Holiday Album =

Studio album by Kenny G
- Released: October 22, 2002
- Studio: Studio G (Malibu, California); WallyWorld Studios (Marin County, California); Westlake Studios, Signet Sound Studios and 20th Century Fox Studios (Los Angeles, California); Sony Pictures Studios (Culver City, California); Paramount Recording Studios (Hollywood, California); Barking Doctor Studios (Mount Kisco, New York)
- Genre: Smooth jazz; Christmas
- Length: 38:36
- Label: Arista
- Producer: Kenny G

Kenny G chronology
Paradise (2002)	Wishes: A Holiday Album (2002)	Ultimate Kenny G (2003)

Professional ratings
Review scores
Source	Rating
Allmusic	3/5 stars
Entertainment Weekly	D

Wishes: A Holiday Album is the third Christmas album and twelfth studio album by saxophonist Kenny G. It was released by Arista Records on October 22, 2002, and peaked at number 1 on the Contemporary Jazz chart, number 2 on the Contemporary Jazz Albums chart, number 29 on the Billboard 200, number 34 on the R&B/Hip-Hop Albums chart and number 64 on the Internet Albums chart. It was the second best-selling Christmas album in the US for 2002 with sales of 501,000 copies for the year.

== Track listing ==
1. "Deck the Halls / The Twelve Days of Christmas" (Traditional) - 3:01
2. "Hark! The Herald Angels Sing / O Come All Ye Faithful" (Felix Mendelssohn/Charles Wesley/John Francis Wade/Frederic Oakeley) - 4:37
3. "Joy to the World" (Lowell Mason/Isaac Watts) - 2:29
4. "God Rest Ye Merry Gentlemen" (Traditional) - 4:34
5. "Rudolph the Red-Nosed Reindeer / Frosty the Snowman" (Johnny Marks/Steve Nelson/Jack Rollins) - 5:21
6. "Wishes" (Walter Afanasieff/Kenny G) - 3:59
7. "Do You Hear What I Hear?" (Noel Regney/Gloria Shayne) - 3:08
8. "Cantique de Noel (O Holy Night)" (Adolphe Adam) - 4:27
9. "Jesus, Joy of Man's Desiring" (Johann Sebastian Bach) - 2:07
10. "Auld Lang Syne (Freedom Mix)" (Robert Burns/Traditional) - 4:53

== Personnel ==
- Kenny G – arrangements, soprano saxophone (1–4, 6–10), tenor saxophone (5)
- Walter Afanasieff – keyboard programming (1–4, 6–9), rhythm programming (1–4, 6–10), arrangements (1–3, 8–10), keyboards (10), synthesizers (10), drum programming (10)
- John Binder – programming (1–4, 6–9)
- Greg Bieck – programming (2, 4), digital programming (10), Macintosh programming (10), additional drum and rhythm programming (10)
- Robert Conley – programming (2–4, 7–9)
- Greg Phillinganes – keyboards (5)
- Randy Waldman – acoustic piano (5)
- Frank Maranzino – programming (6)
- Dave Foxx – additional synthesizers (10), additional drum programming (10)
- Ramón Stagnaro – nylon guitar (6)
- Nathan East – bass (5)
- Vinnie Colaiuta – drums (5)
- Paulinho da Costa – percussion (5)
- William Ross – orchestral arrangements and conductor (1, 2, 4, 6, 10)
- Harvey Cohen – horn and orchestral arrangements (5)
- Jorge Calandrelli – orchestral arrangements and conductor (7, 8)
- Matthew Delapolla – scoring consultant (1, 2, 4–6)
- Debbie Datz-Pyle – orchestra contractor (1, 2, 4–8, 10)
- Patti Zimmitti – orchestra contractor (10)

== Production ==
- Antonio L.A. Reid – executive producer
- Kenny G – producer, liner notes
- Dave Foxx – audio collage producer and arrangements (10)
- Lou Simon – audio collage producer and arrangements (10)
- Steve Shepherd – engineer (1–4, 6–9)
- Nick Thomas – engineer (1, 6), assistant engineer (2–4, 8)
- David Gleeson – engineer (2, 4, 10)
- Humberto Gatica – engineer (5, 6, 10), orchestra engineer (6), mixing (10)
- David Reitzas – engineer (6)
- Cesar Ramirez – assistant engineer (1, 7, 9)
- Chris Brooke – assistant engineer (5, 10)
- Brian Dixon – assistant engineer (6)
- Nick Marshall – assistant engineer (6)
- Peter Doell – assistant engineer (10)
- Mark Eshelman – assistant engineer (10)
- Pete Krawiec – assistant engineer (10)
- Grant Schmitz – assistant engineer (10)
- Bill Smith – Pro Tools engineer (1, 2, 4, 5, 7, 8)
- Joe Wohlmuth – Pro Tools engineer (5–9)
- Al Schmitt – orchestra engineer (1, 2, 4, 5, 7, 8)
- John Rodd – orchestra recordist (7, 8)
- Mick Guzauski – mixing (1–9)
- George Spatta – mix assistant (1–9)
- Vlado Meller – mastering at Sony Music Studios (New York, NY)
- Tom Steel – stage manager (7, 8)
- Damon Tedesco – stage manager (7, 8)
- Rich Davis – production coordinator for Walter Afanasieff
- Joe Mama-Nitzberg – creative director
- Courtney Walter – art direction, design
- Lyndie Benson – photography
- Dennis Turner – management
- Turner Entertainment Group, Inc. – management company

== Charts ==
=== Weekly charts ===
Chart (2002–2003)	Peak position
US Billboard 200	29
US Top Contemporary Jazz Albums (Billboard)	2
US Top R&B/Hip-Hop Albums (Billboard)	34

=== Year-end charts ===
Chart (2002)	Position
Canadian Jazz Albums (Nielsen SoundScan)	9

== Singles ==
Information taken from this source.

Year	Title	Chart Positions	
Year	Title	US AC	US R&B
2002	"Deck the Halls/The Twelve Days of Christmas"	22	
2003	"Auld Lang Syne (Freedom Mix)"		98

== Certifications ==
Region	Certification	Certified units/sales
United States (RIAA)	Gold	500,000^{^}
^{^} Shipments figures based on certification alone.
