= The Greatest Holiday Classics =

Compilation album by Kenny G
- Released: October 18, 2005
- Genre: Smooth jazz, Christmas
- Length: 51:38
- Label: Arista
- Producer: Kenny G, Walter Afanasieff, Clive Davis

Kenny G chronology
At Last...The Duets Album (2004)	The Greatest Holiday Classics (2005)	The Essential Kenny G (2006)

Professional ratings
Review scores
Source	Rating
AllMusic	3/5 stars

The Greatest Holiday Classics is a Christmas album by saxophonist Kenny G. It was released by Arista Records in October 18, 2005, and peaked at number one on the Contemporary Jazz chart, number 26 on the R&B/Hip-Hop Albums chart and number 39 on the Billboard 200.

== Track listing ==
1. "We Wish You a Merry Christmas" (Traditional) – 2:36
2. "Deck the Halls / The Twelve Days of Christmas" (Traditional) – 3:01
3. "Joy to the World" (Lowell Mason/Isaac Watts) – 2:29
4. "Have Yourself a Merry Little Christmas" (Hugh Martin/Ralph Blane) – 3:56
5. "Sleigh Ride" (Leroy Anderson/Mitchell Parish) – 3:48
6. "Miracles" (Kenny G/Walter Afanasieff) – 2:32
7. "Jingle Bell Rock" (Joseph Beal/James Boothe) – 3:33
8. "White Christmas" (Irving Berlin) – 3:02
9. "Winter Wonderland" (Dick Smith/Felix Bernard) – 3:03
10. "My Favorite Things" (Oscar Hammerstein II/Richard Rodgers) – 3:19
11. "We Three Kings / Carol of the Bells" (John Henry Hopkins/Mikhail Leontovich/Peter Wilhousky) – 4:08
12. "Let It Snow! Let It Snow! Let It Snow!" (Sammy Cahn/Jule Styne) – 3:09
13. "Ave Maria" (Franz Schubert) – 4:30
14. "The Chanukah Song" (Kenny G/Walter Afanasieff) – 2:30
15. "Jingle Bells" (James Pierpont) – 2:33
16. "I'll Be Home for Christmas" (Kim Gannon/Walter Kent/Buck Ram) – 3:29

== Singles ==
Year	Title	Chart positions
Year	Title	US Adult Contemporary
2005	"My Favorite Things"	22
2005	"We Wish You a Merry Christmas"	15
2006	"Jingle Bell Rock"	35
