= Havana (Kenny G composition) =

Single by Kenny G

from the album The Moment
- Released: 1997
- Recorded: 1996
- Genre: Smooth jazz; latin; house; (remix)
- Length: 7:22 (album version); 3:59 (single version)
- Label: Arista
- Songwriters: Kenny G; Walter Afanasieff
- Producers: Kenny G; Walter Afanasieff

Kenny G singles chronology
"The Moment" (1996)	"Havana" (1997)	"What a Wonderful World" (1999)

"Havana" is the title of a 1997 single and instrumental by jazz musician Kenny G. It was the second single taken from his 1996 studio album The Moment, released on Arista Records.

== Production ==
The song was written and produced by Kenny G and Walter Afanasieff. As with virtually all of his songs, Kenny G plays the saxophone on this track. The music was arranged by Bill Ross. The song peaked at number 66 on the Billboard Hot 100 chart and number 10 on the Billboard Adult Contemporary chart in early 1997.

== Personnel ==
- Kenny G – soprano saxophone
- Walter Afanasieff – keyboards
- Michael Thompson – guitars
- Paulinho da Costa – percussion
- William Ross – string arrangements

== Remix ==
More noteworthy, however, is the fact that the song was remixed by two well-known DJs Todd Terry and Tony Moran. These mixes gave the song a completely different sound, with an electronic house music backdrop layered in with the original recording. These mixes were released to dance clubs on promotional 12-inch singles, and the remixed "Havana" went to number one on Billboard's Hot Dance Club Play chart in April 1997. To date, this is Kenny's only number one song on this chart. Both the original and dance versions received radio airplay in the United States as well. In the UK, the remixes single reached #88 in the charts in April 1997.

== See also ==
- List of number-one dance hits (United States)
