= The Moment (Kenny G composition) =

Single by Kenny G

from the album The Moment
- Released: 1996
- Genre: Smooth jazz
- Length: 6:00 (Album version) 4:38 (Single version)
- Label: Arista
- Songwriter: Kenny G
- Producer: Kenny G

Kenny G singles chronology
"Sentimental" (1993)	"The Moment" (1996)	"Havana" (1997)

"The Moment" is an instrumental by American Smooth jazz saxophonist Kenny G, from his seventh studio album The Moment which was released in 1996.

== Music video ==
The music video of the song starts with Kenny G coming in a Seaplane and playing his Soprano saxophone. Then, the scene breaks to him flying in the plane to downtown Seattle, where Kenny G hails from. Then performing again in variety of locations, song production house, a sunset scene, in front of Pike Place Market, a crowd watching him performing and finally in the waterfront of Seattle.

== Chart performance ==
"The Moment" was Kenny G's first hit in Billboard Hot 100 in three years. The song reached number 63. It also reached the Hot R&B Singles and Adult Contemporary charts at numbers 62 and 16, respectively. In the UK it reached number 98 in the singles chart.

== Track listings ==
CD-Maxi BMG

No.	Title	Length
1.	"The Moment"	6.00
2.	"Toni Braxton - Un-Break My Heart"	4.30
3.	"Toni Braxton with Kenny G - How Could an Angel Break My Heart"	4.20
4.	"Toni Braxton - Another Sad Love Song"	5.01

== Charts ==
Chart (1996)	Peak position
Canada (Nielsen SoundScan)	3
US Billboard Hot 100	63
US Billboard Hot R&B Singles	62
US Billboard Adult Contemporary	16

== See also ==
- Smooth jazz
