= Sentimental (Kenny G composition) =

1993 single by Kenny G

Single by Kenny G

from the album Breathless
- Released: 1993
- Genre: Jazz
- Length: 6:36 (album version); 4:20 (single Version)
- Label: Arista
- Songwriter(s): Walter Afanasieff; Kenny G

Kenny G singles chronology
"By the Time This Night Is Over" (1993)	"Sentimental" (1993)	"The Moment" (1996)

Music video
- "Sentimental" on YouTube

"Sentimental" is a song by American Smooth jazz saxophonist Kenny G, released in 1993 by Arista Records from his sixth studio album, Breathless (1992).

== Rating ==
It was the third song of the album to reach the US Billboard Hot 100 in 1993, peaking at number 72. A year later, it also appeared on the Billboard Adult Contemporary chart, reaching number 27.

== Track listings ==
No.	Title	Length
1.	"Sentimental"	4:19

== Personnel ==
- Kenny G – soprano saxophone, drum programming
- Walter Afanasieff – keyboards, synth bass, arrangements
- Dean Parks – guitars
- Paulinho da Costa – percussion

== Charts ==
Chart (1993–1994)	Peak position
US Billboard Hot 100	72
US Adult Contemporary (Billboard)	27
US Cash Box Top 100	75
