= Dan Shea (producer) =

American record producer and composer

Daniel Martin Shea is an American record producer and composer who has worked with numerous artists including Mariah Carey, Celine Dion, Jennifer Lopez, Janet Jackson, Santana, Barbra Streisand, Jessica Simpson, Sara Evans, Rob Thomas, Marc Anthony, Boyz II Men, Martina McBride, Kenny G, Ricky Martin, Bono, Mary J. Blige, R. Kelly, Robin Thicke, Toni Braxton, Babyface, Natalie Cole, Phil Collins, Luther Vandross, Michael Bolton, Lady Antebellum, Jim Brickman, Plácido Domingo, Grover Washington Jr., Al Jarreau, Kenny Loggins, Dusty Springfield, Daryl Hall, Boney James, New Kids on the Block, Rissi Palmer, Christina Milian, Jordan Pruitt, Thalía, Savage Garden, Clarence Clemons, and more. As producer, composer, and multi-instrumentalist, Dan Shea's albums have sold over 150 million copies worldwide.

== Biography ==
Shea was born in Chicago, Illinois, and is a multi-instrumentalist who plays piano, guitar, bass and drums. He toured with Mariah Carey for several years as keyboardist and has also appeared in numerous television performances and videos, including three Grammy shows, with Carey, Celine Dion, Santana, Jessica Simpson, Boyz II Men, and more. After working on a number of high-profile records, Shea was approached by Sony Records CEO Tommy Mottola and signed to both production and publishing deals. He soon began working closely with Motolla and producer Cory Rooney on projects including Jennifer Lopez, Marc Anthony Mended and Jessica Simpson I Think I'm in Love with You. Shea has also collaborated with other top producers including David Foster, Walter Afanasieff, Rodney Jerkins, and Keith Thomas. Mostly Afanasieff, he has collaborated with him as a staff producer from 1991 to 1999.

Shea has been successful in several genres besides pop and R&B. He has produced records for country artists including Martina McBride, Sara Evans, Lady Antebellum, Colin Raye and Rissi Palmer (Palmer's song, "Country Girl", co-written with Shea, marks the first time an African-American female has been on Billboard's Hot Country chart in over twenty years.)

Shea has also worked with Smooth Jazz artists including Kenny G (Kenny G - Greatest Hits), Al Jarreau, Grover Washington Jr., Jim Brickman, and Boney James.

He was also an instrumental part of the "Latin Explosion" in popular music with his production on records by Ricky Martin, Jennifer Lopez, Marc Anthony, and Thalía.

== Album/song credits ==
=== Mariah Carey ===
MTV Unplugged
Merry Christmas
DayDream
Butterfly
1's

=== Celine Dion ===
Celine Dion
Let's Talk About Love
Titanic Soundtrack
Beauty and The Beast Soundtrack
All The Way: A Decade Of Song

=== Jennifer Lopez ===
On The 6
JLo
J to the Lo
This Is Me... Then
The Reel Me

=== Janet Jackson ===
20YO

=== Santana ===
Shaman

=== Jessica Simpson ===
Sweet Kisses
A Public Affair

=== Sara Evans ===
Never Alone

=== Martina McBride ===
Valentine

=== Marc Anthony ===
Marc Anthony
Mended

=== Orla Fallon ===
Distant Shore

=== Mariah Carey (w Boyz II Men) ===
One Sweet Day

=== Kenny G ===
Breathless
Greatest Hits
My Heart Will Go On
The Essential Kenny G
Best

=== Ricky Martin ===
Ricky Martin

=== Kirk Franklin (with R. Kelly and Mary J Blige) ===
Lean On Me

=== Toni Braxton ===
Libra

=== Luther Vandroos ===
Songs

=== Jim Brickman ===
Picture This
The Gift
Escape

=== Plácido Domingo ===
Ave Maria

=== Michael Bolton ===
This Is The Time
All That Matters
Joy To The World
Merry Christmas From Vienna

=== Grover Washington Jr. ===
Soulful Strut

=== Lady Antebellum ===
Never Alone

=== Rissi Palmer ===
Rissi Palmer

=== Barbra Streisand ===
Higher Ground

=== Daryl Hall ===
Can’t Stop Dreamin’

=== Kenny Loggins ===
The Unimaginable Life
Starbright

=== Al Jarreau ===
Tomorrow Today

=== Ruff Endz ===
Someone To Love You

=== Ginuwine ===
The Life

=== Colin Raye ===
Greatest Hits

=== Thalía ===
El Sexto Sentido
Arrasando

=== Mandy Moore ===
I Wanna Be With You

=== Boney James ===
Sweet Thing
Funky Xmas

=== Phil Collins ===
Why Can't It Wait Til Morning

=== Tom Jones/Paul Anka ===
A Body Of Work

=== New Kids On The Block ===
FaceThe Music

=== Jordan Pruitt ===
No Ordinary Girl

=== BabyFace ===
Babyface Christmas

=== Peabo Bryson ===
Alladin Soundtrack
Beauty and The Beast Soundtrack

=== Regina Belle ===
Alladin Soundtrack

=== Joey McIntyre ===
Stay The Same

=== Lara Fabian ===
Lara Fabian

=== Savage Garden ===
Affirmation

=== Richard Elliot ===
Best Of Richard Elliot

=== Trey Lorenz ===
Trey Lorenz

=== Brie Larson ===
Finally Out Of PE

=== PYT ===
Center Stage Soundtrack

=== Kirk Whalum ===
Best Of Smooth Jazz 4

=== Fourplay ===
Best Of Fourplay
