= Going Home (Kenny G composition) =

Single by Kenny G

from the album Kenny G Live
- Released: January 21, 1990
- Recorded: April 1988 (Unreleased with Stevie Nicks)/1989 overdubs and completion
- Genre: Smooth jazz
- Length: 5:29 (Album Version) 4:15 (Single Version)
- Label: Arista
- Songwriters: Kenny G, Walter Afanasieff
- Producer: Kenny G

Kenny G singles chronology
"We've Saved the Best for Last" (1989)	"Going Home" (1990)	"Theme from Dying Young" (1991)

"Going Home" is an instrumental song by American saxophonist Kenny G which was released in 1990, from the artist's first live album, Kenny G Live.

Originally recorded in April 1988 for Stevie Nicks' album The Other Side of the Mirror, as working title "Tragedy Of One's Own Soul" and also earlier for a song titled "Lily Girl", both with lyrics written by Nicks. The project was eventually dropped prior to the May 1989 release of her album. There are bootleg versions of both songs widely available online, since neither have ever been officially released by Kenny G or Stevie Nicks.

== Reception in China ==
The song has become almost ubiquitous in China as the unofficial national closing anthem of food courts, outdoor markets, health clubs, shopping malls and train stations throughout the country. Many businesses begin playing "Going Home" over their loudspeakers shortly before closing at night. Television stations also play the song before ending their evening broadcasts. Some trains staffed by Nanchang Railway Bureau play the song when reaching their final destinations. Many Chinese, when asked, say they associate the song with the need to finish their activity and go home, although they may not even know the name of the song or its artist.

Kenny G has said that when he played "Going Home" mid-concert in China, the audience got up and left early.

== Charts ==
Chart (1990)	Peak position
U.S. Billboard Hot 100	56
U.S. Billboard Hot R&B Singles	46
U.S. Billboard Adult Contemporary	5
