= Kashif (disambiguation) =

Kashif is a given name and surname.

Kashif may also refer to:

- Kashif (musician) (1956–2016), American multi-instrumentalist
  - Kashif (1983 album)
  - Kashif (1989 album)
- Kashif & Shanghai Knockout Tournament, a Guyanese football tournament
- Kashif, Syria, a village
