= Kasif =

Kasif or Kaşif may refer to:

- Kaşif ROUV, a Turkish remotely operated underwater vehicle
- Kasif, Israel, future planned city in Negev, Israel

== People ==
- Kasif (musician) (1956-2016), American multi-instrumentalist
- Ahmet Kaşif (born 1950), Turkish Cypriot politician
- Kaşif Kozinoğlu (1955-2011), Turkish intelligence officer
- Tolga Kaşif (born 1992), British-born conductor and composer
- Ofer Kasif (born 1964), Israeli politician

== See also ==
- Kashif The name
- Kashif (disambiguation)
