= Reservations for Two =

Studio album by Dionne Warwick
- Released: July 30, 1987
- Recorded: 1986–87
- Studio: Various: Conway Recording Studios (Hollywood) Hitsville (Los Angeles) Lion Share (West Hollywood, California) New Music Group Studios (Stamford, Connecticut) Ocean Way Recording (Hollywood, California) Sunset Sound Factory (Hollywood) The Village Recorder (Los Angeles)
- Length: 41:55
- Label: Arista
- Producers: Burt Bacharach; Carole Bayer Sager; Kashif; Jerry Knight; Barry Manilow; Smokey Robinson; Aaron Zigman

Dionne Warwick chronology
Friends (1985)	Reservations for Two (1987)	Greatest Hits: 1979–1990 (1989)

Singles from Reservations for Two
- 1. "Love Power" Released: June 1987; 2. "Reservations for Two" Released: September 1987; 3. "Another Chance to Love" Released: March 1988

Professional ratings
Review scores
Source	Rating
AllMusic	3/5 stars
The Rolling Stone Album Guide	3/5 stars

Reservations for Two is a studio album by the American singer Dionne Warwick. It was recorded during the spring of 1987 and released on July 30 of that year. Her eighth album for Arista Records, it was again executive produced by label head Clive Davis. Warwick reteamed with Barry Manilow and the duo Burt Bacharach and Carole Bayer Sager to work on the album, while Kashif, Jerry Knight, Howard Hewett and Smokey Robinson also contributed to the tracks.

Upon release, Reservations for Two peaked at number 56 on the US Billboard 200 and entered the top 20 of the Swedish Albums Chart, peaking at number 14. Its release was preceded by the lead single "Love Power," a duet with Jeffrey Osborne, which reached number 12 on the Billboard Hot 100 and number one on the Adult Contemporary chart. It was followed by the title track, which entered the top 20 on the Hot R&B/Hip-Hop Songs chart.

== Track listing ==
Side one
No.	Title	Writer(s)	Producer(s)	Length
1.	"Love Power" (duet with Jeffrey Osborne)	Burt Bacharach; Carole Bayer Sager	Bacharach; Bayer Sager	4:32
2.	"Close Enough"	David Lasley; Willie Wilcox	Aaron Zigman; Jerry Knight	4:11
3.	"You're My Hero" (duet with Smokey Robinson)	Robinson; Ivory Stone	Robinson	4:41
4.	"In a World Such as This"	Bacharach; Bayer Sager; Bruce Roberts	Bacharach; Bayer Sager	4:16
5.	"Another Chance to Love" (duet with Howard Hewett)	Albert Hammond; Sue Shifrin	Zigman; Knight	4:08

Side two
No.	Title	Writer(s)	Producer(s)	Length
6.	"Reservations for Two" (duet with Kashif)	Tena Clark; Nathan East; Gary Prim	Kashif	4:22
7.	"Cry On Me"	Zigman; Knight	Zigman; Knight	4:09
8.	"Heartbreak of Love" (duet with June Pointer)	Bacharach; Bayer Sager; Diane Warren	Bacharach; Bayer Sager	3:52
9.	"For Everything You Are"	Carol Connors; Lee Holdridge	Kashif	3:50
10.	"No One in the World"	Ken Hirsch; Martha Sharron	Barry Manilow	3:33

Déjà Vu – The Arista Recordings (2020) bonus tracks
No.	Title	Writer(s)	Producer(s)	Length
11.	"Walk Away"	Ken Hirsch; Marti Sharron	Dennis Lambert	4:02
12.	"Take Good Care of You and Me" (with Jeffrey Osborne)	Bacharach; Bayer Sager; Gerry Goffin	Bacharach; Bayer Sager	4:35
13.	"Two Strong Hearts" (featuring Johnny Mathis)	Andy Hill; Bruce Woolley	Peter Bunetta; Rick Chudacoff	3:58

== Personnel and credits ==
Musicians

- Dionne Warwick – lead vocals, backing vocals (6, 10)
- Greg Phillinganes – keyboards (1, 6, 8), synthesizers (6), Rhodes electric piano (10)
- David Foster – synthesizers (1)
- Burt Bacharach – additional synthesizers (1), synthesizers (4)
- Robbie Buchanan – additional synthesizers (1)
- David Boruff – synthesizer programming (1), saxophone solo (4)
- Jerry Knight – all instruments except drums and percussion (2, 5, 7)
- Aaron Zigman – all instruments except drums and percussion (2, 5, 7)
- Reginald "Sonny" Burke – keyboards (3)
- William Bryant – synthesizers (3)
- Randy Kerber – keyboards (4), synthesizers (8)
- Michael Boddicker – synthesizers (4)
- Kashif – keyboards (6, 9), synthesizers (6, 9), drums (6), percussion (6), lead and backing vocals (6), synthesizer programming (9), bass (9)
- Larry Williams – synthesizer programming (6), saxophone solo (7)
- Fred Zarr – keyboards (9), synthesizers (9)
- Jeff Smith – synthesizer programming (9)
- Artie Butler – acoustic piano (10)
- Dann Huff – guitars (1, 4, 6, 8)
- Ira Siegel – guitars (9)
- Charles Fearing – guitars (10)
- Nathan East – bass (1, 3, 6, 8)
- Neil Stubenhaus – bass (4, 10)
- Carlos Vega – drums (1, 8)
- John Robinson – drums (2, 4, 5, 7)
- Ed Greene – drums (3, 10)
- Paul Leim – drums (6, 9)
- Paulinho da Costa – percussion (2, 5, 7, 9)
- Bashiri Johnson – percussion (6)
- Alan Estes – percussion (10)
- Kenny G – alto saxophone solo (1)
- David Majal Li – saxophone (3)
- Jeffrey Osborne – lead vocals (1)
- Tim Feehan – backing vocals (1, 4)
- Joe Pizzulo – backing vocals (1, 4)
- Kevin Dorsey – backing vocals (2)
- James Ingram – backing vocals (2)
- David Lasley – backing vocals (2)
- Phil Perry – backing vocals (2)
- Smokey Robinson – lead vocals (3)
- Patricia Henley – backing vocals (3)
- Robert Henley – backing vocals (3)
- Alfie Silas – backing vocals (3)
- Howard Smith – backing vocals (3)
- Ivory Stone – backing vocals (3)
- Howard Hewett – lead vocals (5)
- Yogi Lee – backing vocals (6)
- June Pointer – lead vocals (8)
- Tommy Funderburk – backing vocals (10)
- Tom Kelly – backing vocals (10)
- Richard Page – backing vocals (10)

Music arrangements

- Jerry Knight – musical bridge arrangements (2)
- Aaron Zigman – musical bridge arrangements (2)
- Gene Page – arrangements (3), string and horn arrangements (6)
- Kashif – rhythm arrangements (6, 9)
- Fred Zarr – rhythm arrangements (9)
- Artie Butler – orchestration (10), musical arrangements (10)
- Barry Manilow – musical arrangements (10)

Production

- Clive Davis – executive producer
- Burt Bacharach – producer (1, 4, 8)
- Carole Bayer Sager – producer (1, 4, 8)
- Jerry Knight – producer (2, 5, 7)
- Aaron Zigman – producer (2, 5, 7)
- Smokey Robinson – producer (3)
- Kashif – producer (6, 9)
- Barry Manilow – producer (10)
- Michael DeLugg – associate producer (10)
- Frank DeCaro – musical contractor (1, 4, 8)
- Russell Sidelsky – production coordinator (6, 9)
- Eric Borenstein – project coordinator (10)
- Marc Hulett – assistant to Barry Manilow (10)
- Maude Gilman – art direction
- Ann Petter – design
- Harry Langdon – photography
- Clifford Peterson – hairdresser
- Luiz Archer – fashion stylist
- Wynona Price – make-up

Technical credits

- Bernie Grundman – mastering at Bernie Grundman Mastering (Hollywood, California)
- Mick Guzauski – mixing (1, 2, 4, 5, 7, 8), engineer (1, 4, 8)
- Smokey Robinson – mixing (3)
- Russ Terrana – engineer (3), additional engineer (6)
- Darroll Gustamachio – engineer (6, 9), mixing (6, 9)
- Michael DeLugg – engineer (10)
- Daren Klein – additional engineer (1, 4, 8), engineer (2, 5, 7), mixing (3)
- Tommy Vicari – additional engineer (1)
- Cal Harris – additional engineer (6)
- Marnie Riley – assistant engineer (1, 8)
- Gary Wagner – assistant engineer (1, 8)
- John Dranchak – assistant engineer (6, 9)
- Steve James – assistant engineer (6)
- Bob Loftus – assistant engineer (6)
- Steve MacMillan – assistant engineer (6)
- Larry Smith – assistant engineer (6, 9)
- Bill Jackson – assistant engineer (10)
- Tom Nist – assistant engineer (10)

== Charts ==
Chart performance for Reservations for Two
Chart (1987)	Peak position
Canada Top 100 Albums (RPM)	87
Italian Albums (Musica e dischi)	14
Swedish Albums (Sverigetopplistan)	14
US Top Pop Albums (Billboard)	56
US Top Black Albums (Billboard)	32
US Top 100 Albums (Cash Box)	60
US Top Black Contemporary Albums (Cash Box)	26
