= G Force =

Studio album by Kenny G
- Released: December 1983
- Recorded: 1983
- Studios: Celestial Sounds Studio, The Hit Factory and Secret Sounds Studios (New York City, New York)
- Genres: Smooth jazz; jazz-funk
- Length: 38:45
- Label: Arista
- Producers: Kenny G; Wayne Brathwaite; Kashif

Kenny G chronology
Kenny G (1982)	G Force (1983)	Gravity (1985)

Alternative cover
- Late 1980s reissue cover

Professional ratings
Review scores
Source	Rating
AllMusic	3/5 stars

G Force is the second studio album by American saxophonist Kenny G. It was released by Arista Records in 1983, and peaked at number 6 on the Billboard Jazz Albums chart, number 17 on the R&B/Hip-Hop Albums, and number 62 on the Billboard 200 chart.

== Track listing ==
No.	Title	Writer(s)	Length
1.	"Hi, How Ya Doin'?" (vocals, Barry Johnson)	Steve Horton	5:38
2.	"I've Been Missin' You"	Kenny Gorelick; Kashif Saleem	4:17
3.	"Tribeca"	Kenny Gorelick; Kashif Saleem; Wayne Brathwaite	4:40
4.	"G Force"	Kenny Gorelick; Marlon McClain; Roger Sause	4:59
5.	"Do Me Right" (vocals, Barry Johnson)	Steve Horton	4:37
6.	"I Wanna Be Yours"	Kenny Gorelick	4:31
7.	"Sunset at Noon"	Kenny Gorelick; Kashif Saleem	5:16
8.	"Help Yourself to My Love"	Paul Lawrence Jones III	4:47
Total length:			38:45

- Track information adapted from Discogs and then verified from the LP label.

== Personnel ==
Musicians and Performers

- Kenny G – saxophones, flute, synthesizer programming, synthesizers (1–3, 5), Lyricon solo (5), percussion (6)
- Jeff Lorber – keyboards (1, 2, 4)
- Barry J. Eastmond – keyboards (1, 3, 5, 6)
- Peter Scherer – Synclavier (1–6, 8)
- Kashif – keyboards (7, 8), synthesizers (7, 8), Synclavier (7), drums (7, 8), percussion (7, 8), bass (8)
- Paul Lawrence Jones III – keyboards (8)
- Ira Siegel – guitars (1, 3, 6, 8)
- Marlon McClain – guitars (2, 4, 6)
- Wayne Brathwaite – bass (1–7), synthesizers (3, 5, 6), percussion (6)
- Omar Hakim – drums (1, 2, 4, 6)
- Yogi Horton – drums (3)
- Leslie Ming – drums (3, 5)
- Bashiri Johnson – percussion (1, 3–5)
- Steve Kroon – percussion (2)
- Barry "Sunjohn" Johnson – lead vocals (1, 5)
- Steve Horton – backing vocals
- Freddie Jackson – backing vocals
- La Forrest 'La La' Cope – backing vocals
- Yolanda Lee – backing vocals
- B. J. Nelson – backing vocals
- Lillo Thomas – backing vocals

Arrangements

- Kenny G – arrangements (1–6)
- Kashif – arrangements (1–3, 5, 7, 8)
- Wayne Brathwaite – arrangements (1, 3, 5, 6)
- Steve Horton – arrangements (1, 5)

== Production ==
- Kashif – executive producer
- Wayne Brathwaite – producer (1, 3–8), co-producer (2)
- Kenny G – co-producer (2)
- Darrell Gustamachio – engineer
- Ron Banks – assistant engineer
- John Davenport – assistant engineer
- Larry DeCarmine – assistant engineer
- Tom Gartland – assistant engineer
- Carl Beatty – additional engineer
- Bill Dooley – additional engineer
- Brian McGee – additional engineer
- Jon Smith – additional engineer
- Michael H. Brauer – drum engineer (3)
- Steve Goldman – mixing
- Donn Davenport – art direction
- Howard Fritzson – art direction
- Tony Gable – logo design
- Pierre Chanteau – photography
- Pamela Jenette – make-up
- Shanault Wadley – fashion designer
- Jeffrey Ross Music – management

== Charts ==
=== Album ===
Chart (1984)	Peak position
Traditional Jazz (Billboard)	6
US Top R&B/Hip-Hop Albums (Billboard)	17
US Billboard 200	62

=== Singles ===
Title	Date	Chart	Peak position
"Hi, How Ya Doin?"	April 13, 1984	US Hot R&B/Hip-Hop Songs (Billboard)	23

== Certifications ==
Region	Certification	Certified units/sales
United States (RIAA)	Platinum	1,000,000^{^}
^{^} Shipments figures based on certification alone.
