= Love Changes =

Studio album by Kashif
- Released: November 1987
- Studios: New Music Group Studios (Stamford, Connecticut); Criteria Studios (Miami, Florida); The Hit Factory and Soundworks (New York City, New York); Ocean Way Recording (Hollywood, California); Lion Share and Motown Recording Studios (Los Angeles, California).
- Length: 79:51
- Label: Arista
- Producers: Kashif; Lewis Martineé

Kashif chronology
Condition of the Heart (1985)	Love Changes (1987)	Kashif (1989)

Love Changes is the fourth studio album by American singer Kashif. It was released by Arista Records in 1987. The album was digitally remastered in 2012 by Funky Town Grooves and included six bonus tracks.

== Background ==
The album includes the hit singles "Love Changes" with Meli'sa Morgan, "Love Me All Over", and "Loving You Only". Vocal trio Exposé provided most backing vocals; the track "Fifty Ways (To Fall in Love)" featured background vocals performed by Whitney Houston. The song "Love Changes" was originally sung by R&B group Mother's Finest in 1978, and covered again in 2005 by R&B artist Jamie Foxx, and hip-hop artist Mary J. Blige.

== Critical reception ==
Professional ratings
Review scores
Source	Rating
AllMusic	2/5 stars

Ron Wynn wrote in his retrospective review for AllMusic: "Kashif went the duet route on this late '80s release, working with both Dionne Warwick and Meli'sa Morgan and doing relatively well both times [...] The album was otherwise as slick and overproduced as ever, and his singing went back to the subdued patterns of earlier works."

== Track listing ==
All tracks produced by Kashif; except "Who's Getting Serious?," produced by Lewis Martineé and Kashif.

Side one
No.	Title	Writer(s)	Length
1.	"Love Changes" (with Meli'sa Morgan)	Skip Scarborough	4:51
2.	"Loving You Only"	Kashif; Doug E. Fresh; Pamela Phillips-Oland	4:35
3.	"It All Begins Again"	James Patrick Dunne; Phillips-Oland	4:40
4.	"Love Me All Over"	Kashif; Greg Phillinganes	5:18
5.	"Midnight Mood" (with Kenny G)	Kashif	2:32

Side two
No.	Title	Writer(s)	Length
6.	"Fifty Ways (To Fall in Love)"	Kashif	4:50
7.	"Somebody"	Kashif; Cliff Dawson	4:32
8.	"Who's Getting Serious?"	Toni Colandreo; Steve Lunt; Seth Swirsky	4:36
9.	"Reservations for Two" (with Dionne Warwick)	Tena Clark; Nathan East; Gary Prim	4:23
10.	"Vacant Heart"	Kashif	3:59

Funky Town Grooves reissue (2012) bonus tracks
No.	Title	Writer(s)	Length
11.	"Love Changes" (Full Version) (featuring Meli'sa Morgan)	Scarborough	6:23
12.	"Loving You Only" (Extended Remix)	Kashif; Fresh; Phillips-Oland	6:31
13.	"Love Me All Over" (Extended Version)	Kashif; Phillinganes	6:45
14.	"Love Changes" (Acappella Version) (featuring Meli'sa Morgan)	Scarborough	4:08
15.	"Kathryn"	Kashif	5:44
16.	"Love Changes" (Instrumental Version)	Scarborough	5:52

== Personnel ==
- Kashif – lead vocals (1–4, 6–10), backing vocals (1, 2, 4, 7, 8, 9), keyboards (1–7, 9, 10), Synclavier (2, 3), percussion (2, 3, 6, 9, 10), rhythm arrangements (2, 4, 7, 9), synthesizers (4, 7, 9), programming (4), bass (4, 6, 10), drums (4, 6, 9, 10), all vocals (5)
- Larry Williams – programming (1), synthesizer programming (9)
- Eric Rehl – keyboards (2), bass (2), drums (2), rhythm arrangements (2)
- Darroll Gustamachio – Synclavier vocal programming (2)
- Robbie Buchanan – keyboards (3, 5), synthesizers (4), programming (4)
- Greg Phillinganes – acoustic piano (4), Rhodes piano (4), synthesizers (4, 9), backing vocals (4), keyboards (9)
- Mike Bakst – keyboards (8), percussion programming (8)
- Lewis Martineé – keyboards (8), percussion programming (8)
- Ira Siegel – guitars (2, 6, 7, 10)
- Dann Huff – guitars (3, 4, 9)
- Nestor Gomez – guitars (8)
- Wayne Braithwaite – bass (1)
- Nathan East – bass (3, 9)
- Paul Leim – drums (1, 3, 4, 5, 8), percussion (5)
- Bashiri Johnson – percussion (2, 9)
- Kenny G – soprano sax solo (5), alto saxophone (7)
- Vincent Henry – saxophone (6)
- Gene Page – horn and string arrangements (3, 4, 7, 9), conductor (3, 4, 7, 9)
- Meli'sa Morgan – lead and backing vocals (1)
- Yogi Lee – additional backing vocals (1, 2), backing vocals (3, 4, 9, 10)
- Audrey Wheeler – additional backing vocals (1), backing vocals (4)
- Brenda White – additional backing vocals (1), backing vocals (4)
- Doug E. Fresh – rap (2), vocal percussion (2)
- Johnny Kemp – backing vocals (3)
- Fonzi Thornton – backing vocals (4, 10), additional backing vocals (8)
- Whitney Houston – backing vocals (6)
- Cliff Dawson – backing vocals (7), rhythm arrangements (7)
- Exposé – backing vocals (8)
- Debra Byrd – additional backing vocals (8)
- Michelle Cobbs – additional backing vocals (8), backing vocals (10)
- Dionne Warwick – lead and backing vocals (9)
- Philip Ballou – backing vocals (10)
- Suzanne Slaughter – backing vocals (10)

Technical and Design

- Darroll Gustamachio – engineer (1–7, 9), mixing (1–7, 9, 10), additional engineer (8)
- Michael O'Reilly – engineer (1), mixing (1, 3, 8, 10)
- Lewis Martineé – engineer (8)
- Mike Couzzi – engineer (8)
- Kurt Upper – engineer (10)
- Dennis Mitchell – additional engineer (1), engineer (10)
- Russ Terrana – additional engineer (3, 4, 5, 7, 9)
- John Guess – additional engineer (8)
- Calvin Harris – additional engineer (9)
- Alan Gregorie – assistant engineer (1)
- Bob Loftus – assistant engineer (1, 9)
- Steve MacMillan – assistant engineer (1, 9)
- Craig Vogel – assistant engineer (2)
- Roger Talkov – assistant engineer (2)
- Michael Dotson – assistant engineer (3, 4, 7)
- Michael C. Ross – assistant engineer (3, 4)
- Larry Smith – assistant engineer (4, 9)
- Karen Siegel – assistant engineer (8)
- John Dranchak – assistant engineer (9)
- Steve James – assistant engineer (9)
- Adrian Salley – production coordinator
- Russell Sidelsky – production coordinator
- Mark Larson – art direction
- Ann Petter – design
- Matthew Rolston – photography

== Charts ==
Chart (1987 - 1988)	Peak position
US Billboard 200	118
US Top R&B/Hip-Hop Albums (Billboard)	17
