= Dionne Warwick Sings Cole Porter =

Studio album by Dionne Warwick
- Released: June 11, 1990
- Studios: Atlantic Studios, Clinton Recording Studios, Greene St. Recording, Unique Recording Studios, Soundtrack Studios and The Hit Factory Times Square Studio (New York City, New York); Ocean Way Recording (Hollywood, California); The Village Recorder (Los Angeles, California)
- Genre: Jazz
- Length: 48:22
- Label: Arista
- Producer: Arif Mardin

Dionne Warwick chronology
Greatest Hits: 1979–1990 (1989)	Dionne Warwick Sings Cole Porter (1990)	Hidden Gems: The Best of Dionne Warwick, Vol. 2 (1992)

Dionne Warwick Sings Cole Porter is a studio album by American singer Dionne Warwick. Her ninth album for Arista Records, it was released on June 11, 1990, in the United States. A tribute to American composer and songwriter Cole Porter, Warwick worked with Arif Mardin on the album, which consists of several of Cole's jazz standards that he had written during the 1930s through 1950s, including "Night and Day", "You're the Top" and "I've Got You Under My Skin." Released to contrasting reviews, it reached number 155 on the U.S. Billboard 200.

== Background ==
In 1987, Warwick released Reservations for Two, her eighth album with Arista Records. Though the album produced the top 20 hit single "Love Power," a duet with Jeffrey Osborne, it failed to reprise the success of previous album Friends (1985) and missed the top fifty on the U.S. Billboard 200. Producer Arif Mardin suggested making a jazz-inflected album of Cole Porter renditions with Warwick next. While the pair recorded a first version in that fashion, Arista head Clive Davis found that the result "sounded too much like a cabaret recording" since he was looking for a ballroom-style sound for the album instead. Warwick and Mardin were forced to rerecord the album, resulting in an overall sound which Warwick first considered "very vanilla," though she later expressed her pride in the project, thinking of it as "one of [her] best works." In 1990, Dionne Warwick Sings Cole Porter won her the first Cole Porter Centennial Award, "You're the Top", given in recognition of outstanding achievements for sustaining the Cole Porter Legend.

== Critical reception ==
Professional ratings
Review scores
Source	Rating
AllMusic	3/5 stars
Entertainment Weekly	C−

Dionne Warwick Sings Cole Porter earned contrasting reviews from music critics. People found that "though not altogether a trip to the moon on gossamer wings, it’s still a wonderfully buoyant endeavor. With a voice that sounds like coffee percolating, Warwick charges her way through 13 of Porter’s intoxicating, seductive hits [...] Strange, dear, but true, dear, the unusual combination of Warwick and Porter works. For a singer who’s primarily known for her pop sound, Warwick does a surprisingly fine job of putting over Porter’s wry, elegant lyrics." Stephen Holden from The New York Times sumed the album as "sedate, homogenized ballroom style of traditional pop [...]."

Ron Wynn from AllMusic called Dionne Warwick Sings Cole Porter "a grand idea, but Warwick didn't meet the challenge as magically as she might have in the 1960s or '70s. Instead, she sounded almost prim and stiff instead of engaging and confident [...] It was still worth hearing, but far from the anticipated triumph." Greg Sandow in Entertainment Weekly wrote, "it can't be easy for seasoned professionals to squeeze the life out of 11 airy Cole Porter songs. But Dionne Warwick and her arranger Arif Mardin come amazingly close to doing just that. Most of the fault is Warwick's. She can sing the songs, in a voice that rides with brassy equilibrium over the highest arch of their often-challenging melodies. But she doesn't brighten them."

== Commercial performance ==
The album debuted at number 172 on the US Billboard 200 in the week ending August 18, 1990. It peaked at number 155 on September 15, 1990, its fifth week on the chart. This marked Warwick's lowest peak for one of her regular studio albums since Love at First Sight (1977), her final album with Warner Bros. Records.

== Track listing ==
All tracks written by Cole Porter and produced by Arif Mardin.

No.	Title	Length
1.	"Night and Day"	3:39
2.	"I Love Paris"	3:27
3.	"I Get a Kick Out of You"	3:53
4.	"What Is This Thing Called Love?"/"So in Love"	3:18
5.	"You're the Top"	3:25
6.	"I've Got You Under My Skin"	3:38
7.	"Begin the Beguine"	5:18
8.	"It's All Right with Me"	4:38
9.	"Anything Goes"	2:37
10.	"You'd Be So Nice to Come Home To"	2:58
11.	"All of You"	3:20
12.	"I Concentrate on You"	3:26
13.	"Just One of Those Things"	3:31
14.	"Night and Day" (Jazz Version featuring Stanley Jordan and Grover Washington Jr.)	3:20

- Tracks "You'd Be So Nice to Come Home To" listed as track B4 available only on vinyl version, "I Concentrate on You" listed as track B6 and "Just One of Those Things" available only on CD.

== Personnel ==
Musicians

- Dionne Warwick – vocals
- Robbie Kondor – main keyboards, synthesizers, synthesizer programming, bass programming, drum programming, drums, percussion
- Keith "Plex" Barnhart – additional keyboards, additional synthesizers, additional synthesizer programming, bass programming
- Reggie Griffin – additional keyboards, additional synthesizers, additional synthesizer programming, guitars
- David LeBolt – additional keyboards, additional synthesizers, additional synthesizer programming
- Joe Mardin – additional keyboards, additional synthesizers, additional synthesizer programming, bass programming, drum programming, drums percussion
- Rob Mounsey – additional keyboards, additional synthesizers, additional synthesizer programming, bass programming, drum programming
- Philippe Saisse – additional keyboards, additional synthesizers, additional synthesizer programming
- Dominic Cortese – accordion
- Jeff Mironov – guitars
- David Spinozza – guitars
- Chuck Berghofer – bass
- Chuck Domanico – bass
- Wayne Pedzwater – bass
- Clint De Ganon – drums
- Harvey Mason – drums
- Steve Schaeffer – drums
- Charles Leighton – harmonica
- Lou Marini – alto saxophone
- Phil Bodner – clarinet
- Gene Orloff – concertmaster (1–8, 10, 12, 13)
- Endre Granat – concertmaster (9)
- Gerard Vinci – concertmaster (11)
- Angela Cappelli – backing vocals
- Rachele Cappelli – backing vocals
- Lisa Fischer – backing vocals
- Frank Floyd – backing vocals
- Lani Groves – backing vocals
- Will Lee – backing vocals
- Frank Sims – backing vocals
- Mark Stevens – backing vocals

Musicians on "Night and Day" (Jazz version)

- Robbie Kondor – keyboards
- Stanley Jordan – guitars
- Anthony Jackson – bass
- J.T. Lewis – drums
- Errol "Crusher" Bennett – percussion
- Grover Washington Jr. – soprano saxophone

Music arrangements

- Arif Mardin – arrangements (1–3, 5, 6, 8, 10, 13), orchestrations (1–3, 5–8, 10, 13), basic track arrangements (7)
- Peter Matz – introductory verse arrangement (3), arrangements and orchestrations (11)
- Jonathan Tunick – arrangements and orchestrations (4)
- Reggie Griffin – basic track arrangements (7)
- Marc Shaiman – arrangements and orchestrations (9)
- Robbie Kondor – arrangements and orchestrations (12, 13)

== Production ==
- Clive Davis – executive producer
- Arif Mardin – producer
- Vicky Germaise – project coordinator
- Maude Gilman – art direction
- Anthony Ranieri – design
- Harry Langdon – photography

Technical credits

- Michael O'Reilly – recording (1–8, 10, 12, 13), mixing (1–8, 10, 12, 13)
- Don Hahn – recording (9, 11), mixing (9, 11)
- John Mahoney – additional recording
- Rod O'Brien – additional recording
- Nick Sansano – additional recording
- Kris Brauninger – assistant engineer
- Bruce Buchanan – assistant engineer
- Frank Cardello – assistant engineer
- Tracy Chisholm – assistant engineer
- Steven Deur – assistant engineer
- Neil Dignon – assistant engineer
- Ellen Fitton – assistant engineer
- Shawn James – assistant engineer
- Rich July – assistant engineer
- Marga Laube – assistant engineer
- Dave Lebowitz – assistant engineer
- Tim Leitner – assistant engineer
- Joe Martin – assistant engineer
- Billy Miranda – assistant engineer
- Jim Petrie – assistant engineer
- Darin Prindle – assistant engineer
- Arthur Steuer – assistant engineer
- Dave Swanson – assistant engineer
- Dan Wood – assistant engineer

== Charts ==
Chart performance for Dionne Warwick Sings Cole Porter
Chart (1990)	Peak position
Australian Albums (ARIA)	108
US Top Pop Albums (Billboard)	155
