= Hi, How Ya Doin'? =

- UK release artwork

Single by Kenny G

from the album G Force
- Released: 1984
- Genre: Jazz; funk; dance; R&B
- Length: 5:47 (12-inch version); 5:37 (LP version); 3:35 (video version)
- Label: Arista (US ADP-9204)
- Songwriter(s): Steve Horton
- Producer(s): Wayne Brathwaite; Kashif

Kenny G singles chronology
"Against Doctor's Orders" (1983)	"Hi, How Ya Doin'?" (1984)	"Love On The Rise" (1985)

"Hi, How Ya Doin'?" is a song written by Steve Horton and performed by Kenny G, released by Arista Records. It reached number 23 on the U.S. Billboard R&B Singles chart in 1984.

== Track listing ==
- Promotional 12-inch single
1. "Hi, How Ya Doin'?" (Remix Version) – 5:47
2. "Hi, How Ya Doin'?" (LP Version) – 5:37
3. "Hi, How Ya Doin'?" (Instrumental Version) – 4:18

== Chart positions ==
Chart (1984)	Peak position
U.S. Billboard Black Singles	23
UK Singles Chart	70
