= I Just Gotta Have You (Lover Turn Me On) =

1983 single by Kashif

Single by Kashif

from the album Kashif
- B-side: "Instrumental Version"
- Released: 1982
- Genre: Post-disco, R&B
- Length: 3:46 (single version); 4:50 (expanded version); 5:48 (album & 12" version)
- Label: Arista Records
- Songwriter(s): Kashif
- Producer(s): Kashif; Morrie Brown

Kashif singles chronology
"I Just Gotta Have You (Lover Turn Me On)" (1982)	"Stone Love" (1983)

"I Just Gotta Have You (Lover Turn Me On)" is a song by Kashif, released as a single in 1982 on Arista Records. This was the first single from his 1983 self-titled debut album.

== Critical reception ==
Craig Lytle of AllMusic exclaimed, Kashif's "urgent delivery oozes with vibrancy accompanied by a poppin' rhythm arrangement and some solid change-ups."

== Charts ==
Chart (1983)	Peak position
US Bubbling Under Hot 100 (Billboard)	103
US Hot Black Singles (Billboard)	5
US Disco Top 80 (Billboard)	28
UK Singles Chart	79
