= So Emotional (disambiguation) =

"So Emotional" is a song by Whitney Houston.

So Emotional may also refer to:

- "So Emotional", a song by Alex Parks from Honesty
- "So Emotional", a song by Christina Aguilera from her self-titled debut album
- "So Emotional", a song by Kashif from Music from My Mind
- "So Emotional", a song by K-Ci & JoJo from Emotional
- "So Emotional", a song by Ray Dalton
