= Love on the Rise =

Single by Kashif and Kenny G

from the album Condition of the Heart and Gravity
- Released: 1985
- Genre: R&B; funk; post-disco
- Length: 4:18
- Label: Arista
- Songwriter(s): Wayne Brathwaite, Dietrich Coley
- Producer(s): Kashif, Kenny G, Wayne Brathwaite

Kashif singles chronology
| "Ooh Love" (1984) | "Love on the Rise" (1985) | "Condition of the Heart" (1985) |

Kenny G singles chronology
| "Hi, How Ya Doin'?" (1984) | "Love on the Rise" (1985) | "Don't Make Me Wait for Love" (1986) |

"Love on the Rise" is a song by American singer Kashif and saxophonist Kenny G. The song appears on Kashif's third studio album Condition of the Heart and Kenny G's album Gravity and acts as both's lead single. The song was released in 1985.

== Production ==
Kenny G and Kashif had worked together before the single was released, at the beginning of both of their careers. The song is a funk, post-disco song, with the alto saxophone section performed by Kenny G.

== Music video ==
The music video for the song was released in 1985. In the music video, both Kenny G and Kashif are chasing the same woman, but in the end they find out the woman is with somebody else and they become friends.

== Charts ==
| Chart (1985) | Peak position |
|---|---|
| UK Singles Chart | 87 |
| US Hot Black Singles (Billboard) | 24 |
