= Condition of the Heart =

Studio album by Kashif
- Released: 1985
- Studios: New Music Group Studios (Stamford, Connecticut); Atlantic Studios and Electric Lady Studios (New York, New York).
- Length: 55:50
- Label: Arista
- Producer: Kashif

Kashif chronology
Send Me Your Love (1984)	Condition of the Heart (1985)	Love Changes (1987)

Condition of the Heart is the third studio album by American Kashif, released in 1985 on Arista Records. The album includes the hit singles "Condition of the Heart", "Dancing in the Dark (Heart to Heart)" and Anti-Apartheid song "Botha Botha". Condition of the Heart was digitally remastered in 2012 by Funky Town Grooves with three bonus tracks.

== Critical reception ==
Professional ratings
Review scores
Source	Rating
AllMusic	2/5 stars

AllMusic editor Ed Hogan called Condition of the Heart a "mellow album of '80s R&B."

== Track listing ==
All tracks produced by Kashif.

Side one
No.	Title	Writer(s)	Length
1.	"I Wanna Have Love with You"	Kashif	5:05
2.	"Dancing in the Dark (Heart to Heart)"	Kashif; Brian Morgan; Shelly Scruggs	4:22
3.	"Condition of the Heart"	Kashif	4:43
4.	"Say You Love Me"	Kashif; Jeff Smith	4:44

Side two
No.	Title	Writer(s)	Length
5.	"Movie Song"	Kashif; Morgan; Scruggs	5:06
6.	"Stay the Night"	Kashif	4:35
7.	"Weakness"	Kashif; Morgan; Scruggs	4:49
8.	"Botha Botha (The Apartheid Song)"	Kashif; Bashiri Johnson	3:52

Funky Town Grooves reissue (2012) bonus tracks
No.	Title	Writer(s)	Length
9.	"Condition of the Heart" (Extended Version)	Kashif	5:59
10.	"Love on the Rise" (Extended Remix) (featuring Kenny G)	Wayne Brathwaite; Dietrich Coley	7:01
11.	"Love on the Rise" (Instrumental) (featuring Kenny G)	Brathwaite; Coley	5:34

== Personnel ==
- Kashif – vocals, backing vocals, synthesizers, Synclavier, synth bass, drums, arrangements, vocal arrangements
- Brian Morgan – synthesizers, Synclavier vocals, guitars, synth bass
- V. Jeffrey Smith – synthesizers, Synclavier vocals, guitars, synth bass, drums, saxophones, backing vocals, vocal arrangements
- Shelley Scruggs – synthesizers, backing vocals
- John Harris – Synclavier programming, Synclavier vocals
- Bill Keenan – Synclavier programming
- Ira Siegel – guitars
- Bashiri Johnson – drums, percussion
- Chris Parker – drums
- Kenny G – saxophone on "Love on the Rise"
- Kejia Bostic – backing vocals
- Angela Clemmons – backing vocals
- Andrea Dawkins Duvernex – backing vocals
- Yogi Lee – backing vocals
- Cindy Mizelle – backing vocals
- Meli'sa Morgan – backing vocals
- B.J. Nelson – backing vocals
- Audrey Wheeler – backing vocals

== Production ==
- Kashif – producer, engineer
- Brian Morgan – assistant producer
- Shelley Scruggs – assistant producer
- V. Jeffrey Smith – assistant producer
- Darroll Gustamachio – engineer, mix engineer
- John Harris – engineer, mix engineer, assistant engineer
- Alec Head – engineer, mix engineer
- Steve Goldman – mix engineer
- Michael O'Reilly – mix engineer
- Eddie Garcia – assistant engineer
- Michael Marangelo – assistant engineer
- Larry Smith – assistant engineer
- Jerry Garszva – audio design
- Bruce Robbins – studio maintenance
- Michelle Harris – production coordinator
- Sari Johnson – production coordinator
- Ria Lewerke – art direction
- Sue Reilly – design
- Aaron Rapoport – photography
- Gary Evans – hair stylist
- Quitefire – make-up

== Charts ==
Chart (1985)	Peak position
US Billboard 200	144
US Top R&B/Hip-Hop Albums (Billboard)	32
