= Stone Love (disambiguation) =

Stone Love is a 2004 album by Angie Stone.

Stone Love may also refer to:

- "Stone Love" (Kashif song), a 1983 single
- "Stone Love" (Kool & the Gang song), a 1987 single
- Stone Love Movement, a Jamaican sound system

== See also ==
- "Stoned Love", a 1970 single by The Supremes
- "Stoned in Love", a 2006 single by Chicane featuring Tom Jones
- "Stone in Love", a song by Journey from the 1981 album Escape
- Stone-loving mouse, a species of mouse found in India
