= Help Yourself to My Love =

1983 single by Kashif

Single by Kashif

from the album Kashif
- B-side: "Instrumental Version/The Mood"
- Released: 1983
- Genre: Post-disco; R&B
- Length: 3:53
- Label: Arista
- Songwriter(s): Kashif
- Producer(s): Kashif; Morrie Brown

Kashif singles chronology
"Stone Love" (1983)	"Help Yourself to My Love" (1983)	"Say Something Love" (1983)

"Help Yourself to My Love" is a song by Kashif, released as a single in 1983 on Arista Records. This song peaked at No. 28 on the US Billboard Hot Black Singles chart.

== Critical reception ==
Craig Lytle of AllMusic commented, "With its moderately aggressive rhythm, 'Help Yourself to My Love' finds the Brooklyn native patiently cradling the lyric."

== Charts ==
Chart (1983)	Peak position
US Hot Black Singles (Billboard)	28
