= Gravity (Kenny G album) =

Studio album by Kenny G
- Released: May 1985
- Recorded: 1984−1985
- Studio: New Music Group Studios (Stamford, Connecticut); Atlantic Studios and Electric Lady Studios (New York City, New York); Studio G (Seattle, Washington)
- Genre: Smooth jazz; jazz-funk; synth funk
- Length: 37:28
- Label: Arista
- Producer: Kenny G; Wayne Brathwaite; Kashif

Kenny G chronology
G Force (1983)	Gravity (1985)	Duotones (1986)

Professional ratings
Review scores
Source	Rating
AllMusic	2.5/5 stars

Gravity is the third studio album by American saxophonist Kenny G. It was released in May 1985, and reached number 13 on the Billboard Jazz Albums chart, number 37 on the R&B/Hip-Hop Albums chart and number 97 on the Billboard 200.

== Track listing ==
No.	Title	Writer(s)	Lead vocals	Length
1.	"Love on the Rise"	Wayne Brathwaite; Dietrich Coley	Kashif	4:18
2.	"One Man's Poison (Another Man's Sweetness)"	Kashif Saleem	Andre Montague, Kashif	4:06
3.	"Where Do We Take It (From Here)"	Kashif Saleem; Roger Sause	Andre Montague	4:37
4.	"One Night Stand"	Kenny G; Joe Ericksen; Stevie Bensusen	Andre Montague	4:01
5.	"Japan"	Kenny G; Randy Jackson		5:04
6.	"Sax Attack"	Kenny G		5:02
7.	"Virgin Island"	Kenny G		3:14
8.	"Gravity"	Kenny G		4:23
9.	"Last Night of the Year"	Kenny G; Peter Scherer	Andre Montague	2:43
Total length:				37:28

== Personnel ==
- Kenny G – saxophones, flutes, synthesizers, synth bass, drum machine programming, digital wind synth guitar solo (3), backing vocals (3, 4, 6), Synclavier (6), all instruments (7)
- Wayne A. Brathwaite – synthesizers, bass guitar, synth bass, drum machine programming
- Roger Sause – synthesizers, synth bass, drum machine programming
- Kashif – synthesizers, synth bass, drum machine programming, percussion, backing vocals (1, 2), Synclavier (6)
- Sal Gallina – synthesizer programming (3)
- Barry J. Eastmond – acoustic piano (6)
- Peter Scherer – Synclavier (6)
- Rick McMillen – additional synthesizer programming (6), drum mutation (6)
- Fareed Abdul Haqq – guitars (6)
- John Raymond – guitars (6)
- Joe Shekani – guitars (6)
- Ira Siegel – guitars (6)
- Yogi Horton – drums
- Kenny McDougald – drums
- Bashiri Johnson – drum machine programming, percussion
- Tony Gable – percussion
- Yolanda Lee – backing vocals (1–3)
- Jeff Smith – backing vocals (1, 3)
- Andre Montague – backing vocals (2–4)
- Joe Wooten – backing vocals (6)

== Production ==
- Kashif – executive producer, producer (1–6, 8)
- Wayne Brathwaite – producer (1, 3, 4)
- Kenny G – producer (4–9)
- Alec Head – engineer
- Rick McMillen – additional engineer
- Michael O'Reilly – additional engineer
- Bruce Robbins – additional engineer
- Stephen Benben – assistant engineer
- John Harris – assistant engineer
- Howie Weinberg – mastering at Masterdisk (New York, NY)
- Michelle Harris – project coordinator
- Vivian Scott – project coordinator
- Donn Davenport – art direction
- Howard Fritzson – design
- Tony Gable – logo graphics
- Garry Gross – photography
- Hui Wang – stylist
- Gui Vrabi – hair, make-up
- Henry Lehr – clothing
- Fritz/Turner Management – management

== Singles ==
Year	Title	Chart positions
Year	Title	US R&B
1985	"Love on the Rise"	24

== Certifications ==
Region	Certification	Certified units/sales
United States (RIAA)	Platinum	1,000,000^{^}
^{^} Shipments figures based on certification alone.
