= Send Me Your Love (album) =

Studio album by Kashif
- Released: June 18, 1984
- Studios: Atlantic and Soundworks (New York, NY); Digital by Dickerson (Bloomfield, NJ); Garden Rake (Sherman Oaks, CA).
- Length: 72:26
- Label: Arista
- Producer: Kashif

Kashif chronology
Kashif (1983)	Send Me Your Love (1984)	Condition of the Heart (1985)

Send Me Your Love is the second studio album by American singer Kashif. It was released by Arista Records on June 18, 1984, in the United States. His highest-charting album, Send Me Your Love reached number five on the US Top R&B/Hip-Hop Albums chart and spawned the hit singles "Baby Don't Break Your Baby's Heart", "Are You the Woman" and "Ooh Love". In 1985, "Edgartown Groove" brought Kashif and Al Jarreau a Grammy Award nomination for Best R&B Performance by a Duo or Group with Vocal. Send Me Your Love was digitally remastered for the first time by Finesse Records in 2008. In 2012, Funky Town Grooves also remastered and expanded the album including six additional bonus tracks.

== Critical reception ==
Professional ratings
Review scores
Source	Rating
AllMusic	3/5 stars

AllMusic editor Ron Wynn called Send Me Your Love Kashif's "best release from a performance standpoint; his vocals had more vigor and spirit than at any time before or since, and he toned down the production, varied the arrangements, and created a much more interesting and multi-faceted presentation than anticipated."

== Track listing ==
All tracks produced by Kashif.

Side one
No.	Title	Writer(s)	Length
1.	"Baby Don't Break Your Baby's Heart"	Kashif	6:25
2.	"Ooh Love"	Kashif	6:00
3.	"Are You the Woman"	Kashif	5:26
4.	"Love Has No End"	Kashif	2:00

Side two
No.	Title	Writer(s)	Length
5.	"Call Me Tonight"	Kashif; Joseph Wooten; Roy Wooten	5:00
6.	"Send Me Your Love"	Kashif	5:06
7.	"I've Been Missin' You" (featuring Kenny G and George Benson)	Kashif; Kenny G	4:08
8.	"Edgartown Groove" (featuring Al Jarreau)	Kashif; Jarreau	2:45
9.	"That's How It Goes"	Steve Horton	4:12

Funky Town Grooves reissue (2012) bonus tracks
No.	Title	Writer(s)	Length
10.	"Baby Don't Break Your Baby's Heart" (Instrumental)	Kashif	6:29
11.	"Baby Don't Break Your Baby's Heart" (Single Version)	Kashif	4:10
12.	"Ooh Love" (Single Version)	Kashif	4:33
13.	"Ooh Love" (12" Edit)	Kashif	5:16
14.	"Ooh Love" (Instrumental Version)	Kashif	5:51
15.	"Are You the Woman" (Single Version)	Kashif	4:16

== Personnel ==
- Kashif – arrangements, lead vocals (1, 2, 3, 6, 7, 9), backing vocals (1, 6, 7, 9), keyboards (1, 2, 3, 5, 6, 7, 9), Yamaha DX7 (1, 4, 8), Oberheim OB-8 (1), Minimoog (1), drums (1–4, 6–9), percussion (1, 2, 3), bass (3, 6), all other instruments (3, 5, 7), Synclavier vocal arrangement (3), vocals (4), Oberheim OB-Xa (4), Synclavier (4, 7, 8, 9), Rhodes piano (6), synthesizers (6, 9), percussion (7), acoustic piano and piano solo (8), synth bass (8), vocal scats (8)
- Joseph Wooten – keyboards (5)
- Kenny G – keyboards (7), drums (7)
- Steve Horton – keyboards (9), arrangements (9)
- Ira Siegel – guitars (1, 2, 3, 5–9)
- Ronny Drayton – guitars (7)
- George Benson – guitar solo (7)
- Eddie Martinez – guitars (9)
- Wayne Braithwaite – bass (3, 8)
- Roy Wooten – drums (5, 6)
- Bashri Johnson – percussion (4, 8)
- V. Jeffrey Smith – saxophone solo (6), backing vocals (9)
- Meli'sa Morgan – backing vocals (1, 2, 3, 6, 9)
- Lillo Thomas – backing vocals (1, 2, 3, 6, 7, 9)
- Whitney Houston – featured vocal on tag (3)
- Siedah Garrett – vocals (4)
- La La – featured vocals (6)
- Al Jarreau – vocal scat (8)
- Michelle Cobbs – backing vocals (9)

Production

- Kashif – producer
- Darroll Gustamachio – recording, engineer, mixing
- Steve Goldman – engineer
- Michael O'Reilly – engineer
- Phil Burnett – assistant engineer
- Robin Lane – assistant engineer
- Joe Marino-Dickinson – assistant engineer
- Phil Wagner – assistant engineer
- Donn Davenport – art direction
- Mel Dixon – photography
- Shanault Wadley – designs
- Lisa Daurio – stylist
- Roland Copeland – hair stylist
- Joseph DeConza – belts
- Quitefire/Chaloea – make-up

== Charts ==
Chart (1984–85)	Peak position
US Billboard 200	51
US Top R&B/Hip-Hop Albums (Billboard)	4
