= Reservations for Two (song) =

Single by Dionne Warwick and Kashif

from the album Reservations for Two and Love Changes
- Released: September 1987
- Length: 4:22
- Label: Arista
- Songwriters: Tena Clark; Nathan East; Gary Prim
- Producer: Kashif

Dionne Warwick singles chronology
"Love Power" (1987)	"Reservations for Two" (1987)	"Another Chance to Love" (1988)

"Reservations for Two" is a duet by American singers Dionne Warwick and Kashif. It was written by Tena Clark, Nathan East, and Gary Prim for Warwick's 1987 album of the same name. Production was helmed by Kashif; "Reservations for Two" later also appeared on his fourth studio album Love Changes (1987). The ballad was released as the second single from Warwick's album in 1987, and peaked at number 62 on the US Billboard Hot 100.

== Track listing ==
12-inch single
No.	Title	Writer(s)	Producer(s)	Length
1.	"Reservations for Two" (duet with Kashif)	Tena Clark; Nathan East; Gary Prim	Kashif	4:04
2.	"In a World Such as This"	Burt Bacharach; Carole Bayer Sager; Bruce Roberts	Bacharach; Sager	4:15
3.	"For Everything You Are"	Carol Conners; Lee Holdridge	Kashif	3:50

== Credits and personnel ==
Credits lifted from the liner notes of Friends .

- Tena Clark – writer
- Nathan East – bass, writer
- Darrell Gustamachio – engineer, mixing
- Dann Huff – guitars
- Bashiri Johnson – percussion
- Kashif – rhythm arrangements, producer, vocals, backing vocals, keyboards, synthesizers, drums, percussion
- Yogi Lee – backing vocals
- Paul Leim – drums
- Gene Page – horn and string arrangements
- Greg Phillinganes – keyboards
- Gary Prim – writer
- Dionne Warwick – vocals, backing vocals
- Larry Williams – synthesizer programming

== Charts ==
Chart (1987)	Peak position
US Billboard Hot 100	62
US Adult Contemporary (Billboard)	7
US Hot R&B/Hip-Hop Songs (Billboard)	20
