= Condition of the Heart (disambiguation) =

Condition of the Heart is a studio album from Kashif, released in 1985, on Arista Records.

It may also refer to:

- "Condition of the Heart", a song from the 1985, Kashif album: Condition of the Heart
- "Condition of the Heart" (song), a song from the 1985, Prince album: Around the World in a Day

== See also ==
- Heart condition (disambiguation)
