= Take Good Care of You and Me =

Single by Dionne Warwick and Jeffrey Osborne

from the album Greatest Hits: 1979–1990
- Released: October 1989
- Length: 4:35
- Label: Arista
- Songwriters: Burt Bacharach; Carole Bayer Sager; Gerry Goffin
- Producers: Burt Bacharach; Carole Bayer Sager

Dionne Warwick singles chronology
"Another Chance to Love" (1988)	"Take Good Care of You and Me" (1989)	"I Don't Need Another Love" (1990)

"Take Good Care of You and Me" is a duet by American singers Dionne Warwick and Jeffrey Osborne. It was written by Burt Bacharach, Carole Bayer Sager, and Gerry Goffin, while production was helmed by Bacharach and Bayer Sager. Initially recorded for Warwick's 1987 album Reservations for Two (1987), it was left unused in favor of their other duet "Love Power" and later served as the lead single from her compilation album Greatest Hits: 1979–1990 (1989). "Take Good Care of You and Me" peaked at number 25 on the US Adult Contemporary.

== Track listings ==
CD single
No.	Title	Writer(s)	Producer(s)	Length
1.	"Take Good Care of You and Me" (duet with Jeffrey Osborne)	Burt Bacharach; Carole Bayer Sager; Gerry Goffin	Bacharach; Bayer Sager	4:35
2.	"Heartbreaker"	Barry Gibb; Robin Gibb; Maurice Gibb	Gibb-Galuten-Richardson	4:16
3.	"Love Power" (duet with Jeffrey Osborne)	Bacharach; Bayer Sager	Bacharach; Bayer Sager	4:32

== Credits and personnel ==
Credits lifted from the liner notes of Greatest Hits: 1979–1990.

- Burt Bacharach – producer, writer
- Carole Bayer Sager – producer, writer
- Gerry Goffin – writer
- Jeffrey Osborne – vocals
- Dionne Warwick – vocals

== Charts ==
Chart (1989)	Peak position
Italy Airplay (Music & Media)	5
UK Singles (Official Charts)	93
US Adult Contemporary (Billboard)	25
US Hot R&B/Hip-Hop Songs (Billboard)	46
