= Heart condition (disambiguation) =

Heart condition is cardiovascular disease.

Heart condition may also refer to:

- Heart Condition (film)
- "Heart Condition", a song on the album The Boy Who Heard Music

== See also ==
- Condition of the Heart (disambiguation)
