= TaharQa and Tunde Ra Aleem =

Harlem-born African American musicians

- Also known as: The Aleems, Aleem featuring Leroy Burgess, The Ghetto Fighters, Prana People, High Frequency, The Fantastic Aleems, TaharQa Aleem, Taharqa Aleem, Tunde Aleem, Tunde Ra Aleem, Allen Twins, Aleem Twins
- Born: Albert and Arthur Allen; February 14, 1946 (age 80); Harlem, New York, U.S.
- Died: Tunde Ra Aleem - August 14, 2014 (aged 68) Brooklyn, New York, U.S.
- Genres: Funk; soul
- Occupations: Musician; record producer; record executive; songwriter; promoter; author
- Years active: 1968–present
- Labels: Atlantic; NIA Records; Warner Brothers; Prelude; Panorama; Spring
- Formerly of: Jimi Hendrix; Buddy Miles; Billy Cox; Marley Marl; Leroy Burgess; Wu-Tang Clan
- Website: www.niaentertainment.com

TaharQa Z. Aleem (born February 14, 1946) and Tunde Ra Aleem (February 14, 1946 – August 14, 2014) were twins formerly known as Albert Allen and Arthur Allen, respectively. They were American musicians, producers, authors, and entrepreneurs originally based out of Harlem, New York, in addition to being close friends and musical collaborators with Jimi Hendrix. They are known for their 1986 R&B hit "Love's on Fire" featuring Leroy Burgess.

They founded NIA Records, which launched their singles "Hooked on Your Love" and "Release Yourself". NIA Records started the careers of Marley Marl and the Wu-Tang Clan. After the death of Tunde Ra in 2014, TaharQa still continues to be active in humanitarian efforts through his organization Hip-Hop for Humanity.

== Biography ==
TaharQa (Albert Raymond Allen) and Tunde Ra (Arthur Russell Allen) Aleem were born in Harlem, New York on February 14, 1946, to William Austin Allen and Dorothy Phoenix. When the twins were young, they watched R&B artists perform at the Apollo Theater. This propelled the Allen twins to pursue music in various singing groups. Gangster and entrepreneur, Jack "Fat Man" Taylor, who signed the twins' group, the International G.T.O., to his independent record label, Rojac Records. During their time at Rojac Records, the twins had the opportunity to rub elbows with talented and creative people like Clarence "Blowfly" Reid, who was an in-house writer and producer for Rojac Records. Through Fat Man, the twins met Lithofayne (Faye) Pridgeon, a close friend and love interest of Jimi Hendrix. Originally, it was Faye's intention to use Arthur (Tunde Ra) to evict Hendrix from the apartment of her friend June Vasquenza (Maria Gurrero/Pantera) by convincing Arthur to marry June to rectify her status as an illegal alien from Mexico. Instead of kicking Hendrix out, the twins bonded immediately with him over their shared passion of music. The Allen twins became lifelong friends with Hendrix, recording with him several times.

=== Friendship and work with Jimi Hendrix ===
The twins befriended Hendrix before he went to Europe and became a superstar. To keep himself grounded, Hendrix always made it his business to stay connected with his friends from Harlem upon his return to the States. His friendship with the twins would eventually lead to musical collaborations. The twins, musically known as the Ghetto Fighters (a name suggested by Hendrix), would record background vocals on Hendrix's songs, such as "Dolly Dagger", "Freedom", "Stepping Stone" and "Izabella". Hendrix also lent his progressive electric guitar skills to a song the twins recorded in June 1969 at Fame Studios in Muscle Shoals, Alabama, called "Mojo Man". Hendrix overdubbed his guitar parts later in August 1970 at Electric Lady Studios. This was all part of a larger plan for Hendrix to help the twins produce the Ghetto Fighters album, which he called a "street opera."

The twins were featured as background vocalists on at least four (not counting compilations and reissues) Hendrix posthumous albums: Cry of Love (1971 - Platinum), Rainbow Bridge (1971 - Gold), War Heroes (1972), First Rays of the New Rising Sun (1997), and People, Hell and Angels (2013). They were also featured on Experience Hendrix: The Best of Jimi Hendrix (1997 - Double Platinum), The Jimi Hendrix Experience (Purple Box Set) (2000 - Platinum), and Voodoo Child: The Jimi Hendrix Collection (2001 - Gold).

The twins wanted to promote a Harlem concert to showcase Hendrix to the Black community. Hendrix in turn, wanted to show his appreciation to the genesis of his New York musical roots. The original plan was for Hendrix to do the benefit concert for the humanitarian crisis in Biafra (Nigeria) at the Apollo, but the owner, George Schiffman declined the offer. Instead, plans were made to perform an outdoor benefit concert for the United Block Association (UBA) on the corner of Lenox Avenue and 139th St. Before the concert took place on September 5, 1969, Hendrix made the announcement at a September 3 televised press conference at Frank's Restaurant in Harlem. Unfortunately, most of the reporters were more interested in asking questions about his legendary performance at Woodstock, which occurred less than a month earlier in August.

The benefit concert was supported by artists on Fat Man's Rojac Records. Artists like Big Maybelle, Chuck-a-Luck, and LTD, with a young Jeffrey Osborne on drums, warmed the Harlem crowd up for the big finale of Hendrix, Billy Cox, Jerry Velez, Mitch Mitchell, and Larry Lee. This was the same lineup that Hendrix used at Woodstock, called Gypsy, Sun and Rainbows. The concert was set to be filmed professionally, but the filmographer ran out of film before recording Hendrix's act. All that remains are seconds of a video of Hendrix plugging into his amps, pictures taken by few professional photographers, and a substandard distorted audio recording that's barely audible.

=== NIA Records ===
In 1972, after Hendrix died, the Ghetto Fighters changed their musical group's name to US, then Prana People. The group consisted of the twins, their sister Juliette and Tommy Lockhart. They were managed and financed by New York Knicks legend Earl "The Pearl" Monroe. The group released a self-titled album on Prelude Records in 1977.

After the Prana People album, the twins decided to go in a new musical direction, producing the song "Hooked on Your Love" in 1979. The song featured Leroy Burgess on lead vocals, formerly of the R&B group Black Ivory. Rounding out the background vocals were Jocelyn Brown, Crystal Davis, and a young Luther Vandross. The song peaked at No. 15 and spent 16 weeks on Billboard's Dance chart. The Fantastic Aleems released "Get Down Friday Night" and changed their name to High Frequency. High Frequency released single "Summer Time".

At this point, the twins had grown weary of the traditional "shop your demo" approach and opted to go the independent route. They borrowed 1500 dollars from their father, pressed their own records and started NIA Records in 1979 in order to distribute their single. Author Dan Charnas recalls the early business of rap in his book, The Big Payback. The Aleems and Nia Records play a prominent role, as they were responsible for some of rap's seminal MC's.

The twins were starting to get hip to the young fledgling hip-hop scene due to the prodding of Fat Man, whose Harlem World club became a rite of passage for many up-and-coming hip-hop artists. The Sugar Hill Gang was discovered at Harlem World by Joe and Sylvia Robinson of Sugar Hill Records. Fat Man also suggested that the twins take their instrumental for their club hit "Hooked on Your Love" and use it as a backing track for a group called Dr. Jeckyll & Mr. Hyde (Andre Harrell and Alonzo Brown). The demo resulted in a production deal for the Dr. Jeckyll & Mr. Hyde with Profile Records.

The twins' next single on NIA Records, "Release Yourself", was remixed by Marley Marl in 1984. The suggestion of this remix was made by Mr. Magic, whose WBLS show, Mr. Magic's Rap Attack, was just beginning to take NY urban radio into its hip-hop era. NIA records would also distribute songs from Captain Rock, The Last Poet (Abiodun Oyewole), Sparky D's answer record to Roxanne (Sparky's Turn), and Marley Marl featuring MC Shan on Marley Marl's Scratch.

=== 1980s R&B hit ===
The Aleems continued to release hot dance hits on 12-inch singles like 1985's Confusion and its subsequent remix in 1986, both featured vocals from Black Ivory lead vocalist, Burgess. With these releases, Atlantic Records offered the twins a recording deal. This prompted a name change to Aleem. They produced the R&B single "Love's on Fire" (1986), and the song reached No. 23 on R&B chart.

While working on their debut Top 50 R&B 1986 album for Atlantic called Casually Formal, they contracted the services of Maurice Starr, which would prove to be a fruitful relationship when his new group, New Kids on the Block, suddenly took off like his former group, New Edition. Maurice had the twins produce the song "Never Gonna Fall in Love Again" for New Kids on the Block's fourth album, Step by Step. The twins would go on to produce one more album for Atlantic in 1987 called Shock. Both Atlantic albums would feature Burgess on lead vocals.

=== With the Wu-Tang Clan ===
During the '90s, the twins opened Konkrete Recording Studios in Mid-town Manhattan and started B.I.D. (Black Independent Distribution), to promote and distribute records. This allowed them the chance to work with artists like Rick James, Kashif, Technotronic, and the Wu-Tang Clan.

The twins helped the Wu-Tang Clan distribute their first single Protect Ya Neck in New York and helped sign them to LOUD Records. In addition, the twins recorded some of the songs that would appear on Wu-Tang's debut album, Enter the Wu-Tang (36 Chambers) at Konkrete Studios. This collaboration led to the twins working with the Gravediggaz, which featured Prince Paul, Frukwan, Poetic, and Wu-Tang Clan front man and producer RZA.

=== Organizational affiliations ===
The twins founded the ROBC (The Reconstruction of Black Civilization), which was designed to bring attention to the royalty that exists in people of African heritage. The organization sponsored a trip to the U.S. for the son of Emperor Halie Selassie I of Ethiopia, along with several members of the Ethiopian Royal Family.

The twins also founded Hip-Hop for Humanity (HHFH) on September 11, 2001. The goal of HHFH is to assist musically inclined youth by educating them to embrace leadership roles, take responsibility as future leaders, and engaging in positive actions in their community and the world.

The Aleems have also served as advisers and directors of the Hendrix Foundation.

== Other works ==
During the summer of 1970, the twins were working on their debut album. The album was meant to be produced by Hendrix. After Hendrix's death, the album was shelved and the tracks remained unreleased. While a proper tracklist was never compiled, the songs "Mojo Man" and "Jet Set" were intended to be part of the album as highlighted in a Rolling Stone magazine interview on June 8, 1969 conducted by Jerry Hopkins.

In 2010, after Z3 Enterprises signed an agreement to distribute their unreleased music, the twins opened up their vault and began to make their past catalogue available to the public. While the original version of "Mojo Man" appeared on a posthumous Hendrix album called People, Hell and Angels in 2013, the twins' version of "Mojo Man" with additional vocals from Burgess was included in an animated cartoon as a part of their Urban Street Tales series.

In addition to their musical catalogue, the twins authored several books, including a joint memoir about their lives originally published in 2014. This auto-biography, Jimi Hendrix & The Ghetto Fighters: In Harlem World, traces the path of the twins from Harlem hustlers, to befriending Hendrix, to musical pioneers, to respected elders. Other books include The 66 Attributes of the Nigger, Sacred Formulas – To Raise the Royal Mind and Jimi Hendrix and the World of the Mu.

The Aleems were interviewed for the 1973 documentary, Jimi Hendrix. In 1988, the Aleems produced "Two Can Play The Game" for the I'm Gonna Git You Sucka soundtrack. In 1994, the Aleems played themselves in the comedy Twin Sitters, starring the Barbarian Brothers. They wrote and produced the song "Whatcha' Lookin' At" for the Twin Sitters film soundtrack.

== Death of Tunde Ra Aleem ==
On August 14, 2014, Tunde Ra Aleem died to idiopathic pulmonary fibrosis. In 2006, Tunde Ra had a prognosis of 3 to 4 months to live; however, he was able to live eight more productive and lively years. During this time, he completed three books and three albums.

== Legal Dispute ==
In 2016, the TaharQa Aleem and Tajiddin Aleem sued Experience Hendrix L.L.C., Rainbow Guitars, Inc., Harvey Moltz, and the Rock & Roll Hall of Fame & Music, to get back two guitars that Jimi Hendrix gave the Allen twins, a Black Widow and doubleneck Mosirite. They were unsuccessful in their initial attempt and are currently appealing the decision.

== Chart history ==
The Fantastic Aleems

Billboard Dance/Club Single

- Peak Date - (06/21/1980) "Hooked on Your Love" - Peaked at No. 15 (16 weeks on the charts)

Aleem

Billboard Singles - R&B

- Peak Date - (09/29/1984) "Release Yourself" - Peaked at No. 83 (six weeks on the chart)
- Peak Date - (05/03/1986) "Love's on Fire" - Peaked at No. 23 (13 weeks on the chart)
- Peak Date - (07/12/1986) "Fine Young Tender" - Peaked at No. 62 (seven weeks on the chart)
- Peak Date - (10/10/1987) "Love Shock" - Peaked at No. 51 (11 weeks on the chart)

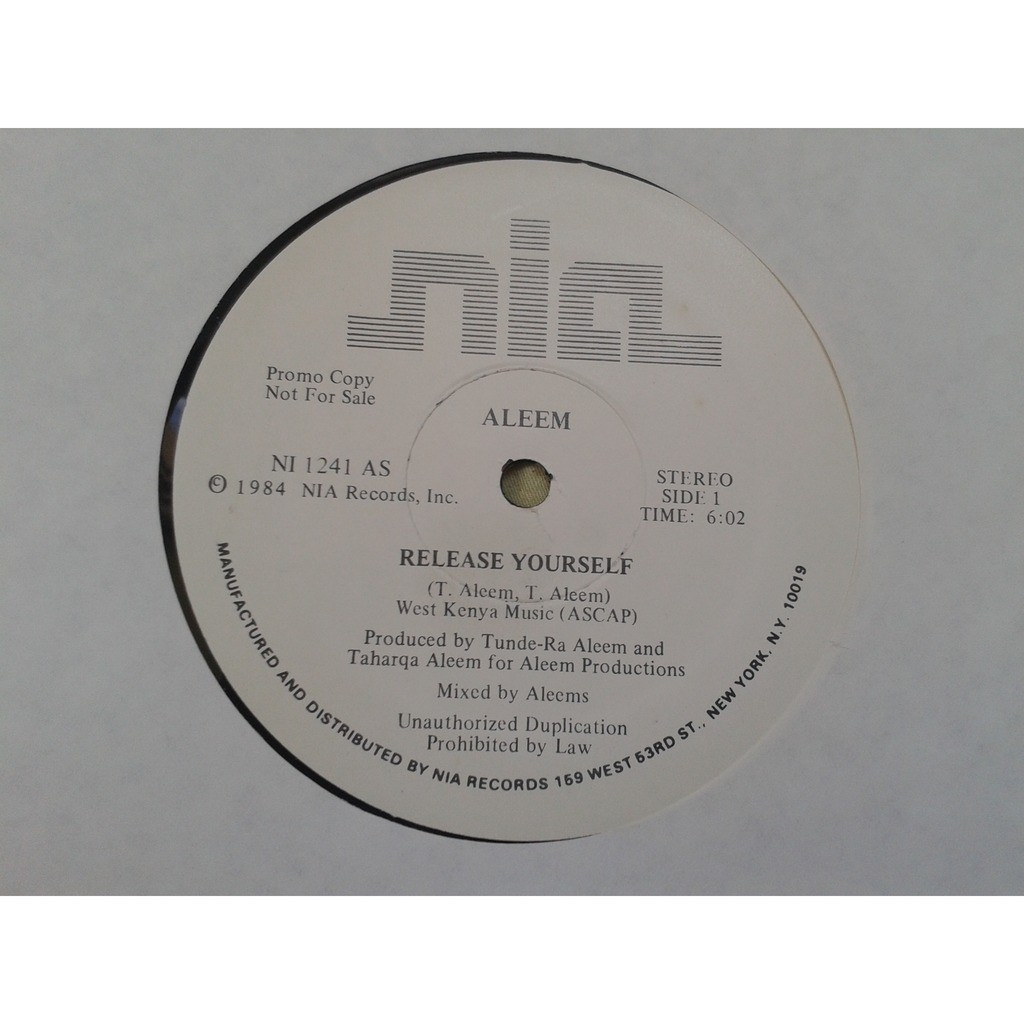
Peaked at No. 23 on the Dance/Club Charts and No. 83 on the R&B Chart

Billboard Singles - Dance/Club

- Peak Date - (09/01/1984) "Release Yourself" - Peaked at No. 23 (16 weeks on the chart)
- Peak Date - (04/26/1986) "Love's on Fire" - Peaked at No. 16 (7 weeks on the chart)

Billboard Album - R&B

- Peak Date - (05/17/1986) Casually Formal - Peaked at No. 45 (eight weeks on the chart)

== Discography ==
AllMusic

Soul Years

Singles that charted
