= People, Hell and Angels =

Compilation album by Jimi Hendrix
- Released: March 5, 2013
- Recorded: March 1968 – August 1970
- Studios: Record Plant, Hit Factory, Sound Centre, Electric Lady; New York City; Fame, Muscle Shoals, Alabama
- Genre: Blues rock
- Length: 52:33
- Label: Legacy
- Producers: Jimi Hendrix; Eddie Kramer; Janie Hendrix; John McDermott

Jimi Hendrix chronology
Winterland (2011)	People, Hell and Angels (2013)	Miami Pop Festival (2013)

Singles from People, Hell and Angels
- 1. "Somewhere" Released: February 5, 2013

People, Hell and Angels is a posthumous compilation album by the American rock musician Jimi Hendrix. The fourth release under the Experience Hendrix deal with Legacy Recordings, it contains twelve previously unreleased recordings of tracks he was working on for the planned follow-up to Electric Ladyland. It was released on March 5, 2013.

== Background ==
The tracks featured on People, Hell and Angels are previously unreleased recordings of songs that Jimi Hendrix and fellow band members (mainly the Band of Gypsys lineup featuring Billy Cox and Buddy Miles) were working on as the follow-up to Electric Ladyland, tentatively titled First Rays of the New Rising Sun. The majority of the recordings are drawn from sessions in 1968 and 1969 at the Record Plant Studios in New York, with a few inclusions from Hendrix's brief residencies at Sound Centre, the Hit Factory, and his own Electric Lady Studios.

== Critical reception ==
Professional ratings
Review scores
Source	Rating
AllMusic	3.5/5 stars
American Songwriter	3.5/5 stars
Consequence of Sound	C−
The Guardian	4/5 stars
The Independent	3/5 stars
NME	8/10
PopMatters	7/10
Q	3/5 stars
Rolling Stone	4/5 stars
Slant Magazine	4.5/5 stars

People, Hell and Angels received generally positive reviews from critics. At Metacritic, which assigns a normalized rating out of 100 to reviews from mainstream publications, it received an average score of 74, based on 18 reviews. In Rolling Stone, David Fricke said Hendrix "plays at an elevated level in every setting" on the album, while The Wire called the recordings "among the best of Hendrix's late work". Patrick Humphries from BBC Music wrote that it "offers a tantalising glimpse of how Hendrix's genius might have progressed". AllMusic's Sean Westergaard was less enthusiastic and said the album "certainly isn't the place to start your Hendrix collection, but collectors will surely want to hear this". Writing for MSN Music, Robert Christgau called it a quality collection of leftovers highlighted by the songs "Somewhere" and "Let Me Move You", in which Hendrix comps behind saxophonist Lonnie Youngblood.

== Track listing ==
All tracks are written by Jimi Hendrix, except where noted.

No.	Title	Length
1.	"Earth Blues"	3:33
2.	"Somewhere"	4:05
3.	"Hear My Train A Comin'"	5:41
4.	"Bleeding Heart" (Elmore James)	3:58
5.	"Let Me Move You"	6:50
6.	"Izabella"	3:42
7.	"Easy Blues"	5:57
8.	"Crash Landing"	4:14
9.	"Inside Out"	5:03
10.	"Hey Gypsy Boy"	3:39
11.	"Mojo Man" (Albert Allen, Arthur Allen)	4:07
12.	"Villanova Junction Blues"	1:44
Total length:		52:33

Target bonus track
No.	Title	Length
13.	"Ezy Ryder/MLK Jam [Captain Coconut]"	20:01
Total length:		72:34

=== Notes ===
- Hey Gypsy Boy is a demo recording of Hey Baby (New Rising Sun). The studio version was previously released on Rainbow Bridge.

== Recording details ==
Track	Location(s) and Recording date(s)
Track 1	December 19, 1969, at Record Plant Studios
Track 2	March 13, 1968, at the Sound Centre
Track 3	May 21, 1969, at Record Plant Studios
Track 4	May 21, 1969, at Record Plant Studios
Track 5	March 18, 1969, at Record Plant Studios
Track 6	August 28, 1969, at the Hit Factory
Track 7	August 28, 1969, at the Hit Factory
Track 8	April 24, 1969 at Record Plant Studios
Track 9	June 11, 1968, at Record Plant Studios
Track 10	March 18, 1969, at Record Plant Studios
Track 11	June 1969, at Fame Studios; August 1970 at Electric Lady Studios (overdubs)
Track 12	May 21, 1969, at Record Plant Studios
Track 13	January 23, 1970, at Record Plant Studios

== Personnel ==
Primary musicians

- Jimi Hendrix – guitars, vocals, (bass guitar on track 9)
- Billy Cox – bass guitar (tracks 1, 3, 4, 6–8, 13)
- Buddy Miles – drums (tracks 1–4, 10, 12, 13)
- Mitch Mitchell – drums (tracks 6, 7, 9)
- Juma Sultan – congas (tracks 3, 4, 6, 7, 12)

Additional musicians

- Larry Lee – rhythm guitar (tracks 6, 7)
- Jerry Velez – congas (tracks 6, 7)
- Stephen Stills – bass guitar (track 2)
- Lonnie Youngblood – vocal & saxophone (track 5)
- Rocky Isaac – drums (track 8)
- Al Marks – percussion (track 8)
- Albert Allen – vocal (track 11)
- James Booker – piano (track 11)
- Gerry Sack – triangle & mime vocal (track 6)

== Charts ==
=== Weekly charts ===
Chart (2013)	Peak position
Australian Albums (ARIA)	29
Austrian Albums (Ö3 Austria)	18
Belgian Albums (Ultratop Flanders)	11
Belgian Albums (Ultratop Wallonia)	13
Canadian Albums (Billboard)	3
Danish Albums (Hitlisten)	16
Dutch Albums (Album Top 100)	2
Finnish Albums (Suomen virallinen lista)	22
French Albums (SNEP)	16
German Albums (Offizielle Top 100)	15
Hungarian Albums (MAHASZ)	12
Irish Albums (IRMA)	70
Italian Albums (FIMI)	23
New Zealand Albums (RMNZ)	12
Norwegian Albums (VG-lista)	29
Scottish Albums (Official Charts)	39
Spanish Albums (Promusicae)	24
Swedish Albums (Sverigetopplistan)	14
Swiss Albums (Schweizer Hitparade)	7
UK Albums (Official Charts)	30
US Billboard 200	2
US Top Rock Albums (Billboard)	1

=== Year-end charts ===
Chart (2013)	Position
Belgian Albums (Ultratop Flanders)	152
Belgian Albums (Ultratop Wallonia)	200
US Billboard 200	160
US Top Rock Albums (Billboard)	41
