= Greatest Hits: 1979–1990 =

Compilation album by Dionne Warwick
- Released: October 31, 1989
- Length: 48:16
- Label: Arista
- Producer: Burt Bacharach; Carole Bayer Sager; Sacha Distel; Gibb-Galuten-Richardson; Dennis Lambert; Barry Manilow; Nick Martinelli; Luther Vandross

Dionne Warwick chronology
The Dionne Warwick Collection: Her All-Time Greatest Hits (1989)	Greatest Hits: 1979–1990 (1989)	Dionne Warwick Sings Cole Porter (1990)

Singles from Greatest Hits: 1979–1990
- 1. "Take Good Care of You and Me" Released: October 1989; 2. "I Don't Need Another Love" Released: March 1990

Greatest Hits: 1979–1990 is a compilation album by American singer Dionne Warwick. It was released by Arista Records on October 31, 1989 in the United States. The album compromises all singles Warwick released with Arista after leaving her previous label Warner Bros. Records in 1978. It peaked at number 177 on the US Billboard 200.

== Critical reception ==
Professional ratings
Review scores
Source	Rating
AllMusic	3/5 stars
Rolling Stone Album Guide	3/5 stars

AllMusic editor Ron Wynn wrote that while Barry Manilow, Barry Gibb, and Luther Vandross returned Warwick "to the elaborately arranged and structured soul-tinged pop that had marked her finest hits," he found that "the lyrics and compositions weren't as consistent as they were during her Burt Bacharach/Hal David period."

== Track listing ==
No.	Title	Writer(s)	Producer(s)	Length
1.	"That's What Friends Are For" (with Elton John, Gladys Knight and Stevie Wonder)	Burt Bacharach; Carole Bayer Sager	Bacharach; Bayer Sager	4:16
2.	"Heartbreaker"	Barry Gibb; Robin Gibb; Maurice Gibb	Gibb-Galuten-Richardson	4:17
3.	"Love Power" (duet with Jeffrey Osborne)	Bacharach; Bayer Sager	Bacharach; Bayer Sager	4:32
4.	"I'll Never Love This Way Again"	Richard Kerr; Will Jennings	Barry Manilow	3:31
5.	"How Many Times Can We Say Goodbye" (with Luther Vandross)	Steve Goldman	Vandross	3:28
6.	"Walk Away"	Ken Hirsch; Marti Sharron	Dennis Lambert	4:04
7.	"Take Good Care of You and Me" (with Jeffrey Osborne)	Bacharach; Bayer Sager; Gerry Goffin	Bacharach; Bayer Sager	4:36
8.	"Déjà Vu"	Adrienne Anderson; Isaac Hayes	Barry Manilow	3:48
9.	"Friends in Love" (with Johnny Mathis)	Jay Graydon; David Foster; Bill Champlin	Graydon	4:02
10.	"No Night So Long"	Richard Kerr; Will Jennings	Steve Buckingham	3:26
11.	"I Don't Need Another Love" (with The Spinners)	Mike Sutton; Brenda Sutton	Nick Martinelli	4:11
12.	"All the Time"	Barry Manilow; Marty Panzer	Barry Manilow	4:06

== Charts ==
Chart (1989 and 1995)	Peak position
Australian Albums (ARIA)	168
US Billboard 200	177
