= Kenny G (album) =

1982 studio album by Kenny G

Studio album by Kenny G
- Released: August 24, 1982
- Recorded: February 1 – June 14, 1982
- Studio: Indigo Ranch Studio (Malibu, California)
- Genre: Smooth jazz, jazz-funk
- Length: 34:14
- Label: Arista
- Producer: Jeff Lorber; Meco Monardo

Kenny G chronology
Kenny G (1982)	G Force (1983)

Alternative cover
- Late 1980s reissue cover

Professional ratings
Review scores
Source	Rating
AllMusic	2/5 stars

Kenny G is the debut studio album by American jazz saxophonist Kenny G, released in 1982 by Arista Records. It reached number 10 on the Billboard Jazz Albums chart.

== Track listing ==
1. "Mercy, Mercy, Mercy" – 3:41 (Joe Zawinul)
2. "Here We Are" (lead vocals: Greg Walker) – 4:15 (Jeff Lorber, Marlon McClain)
3. "Stop and Go" – 3:31 (Stevie Bensusen, Joe Ericksen, Kenny G, Jeff Lorber)
4. "I Can't Tell You Why" – 4:12 (Glenn Frey, Don Henley, Timothy B. Schmit)
5. "The Shuffle" – 4:24 (Kenny G, Jeff Lorber)
6. "Tell Me" – 5:52 (Kenny G, Jeff Lorber)
7. "Find a Way" – 4:34 (Joe Ericksen, Kenny G, Jeff Lorber)
8. "Crystal Mountain" – 0:39 (Kenny G)
9. "Come Close" – 2:54 (David Chesky)

== Personnel ==
- Kenny G – soprano saxophone, tenor saxophone, alto flute, flute, Lyricon solo (3), Minimoog (3), horn arrangements
- Jeff Lorber – keyboards, LinnDrum programming (5), horn arrangements
- Marlon McClain – guitars
- Neil Stubenhaus – bass (1, 2, 4, 9)
- Jimmy Haslip – bass (3, 6, 7)
- John "J.R." Robinson – drums
- Steve Forman – percussion
- Kim Hutchcroft – baritone saxophone
- Meco Monardo – trombone, horn arrangements
- Steve Madaio – trumpet
- Greg Walker – lead and backing vocals (2)

== Production ==
- Jeff Lorber – producer, arrangements
- Meco Monardo – producer, arrangements
- Chris Brunt – engineer, mixing
- Dennis Hansen – assistant engineer
- Rick McMillen – assistant engineer
- Ken Perry – mastering at Masterfonics (Nashville, Tennessee)
- Ria Lewerke – art direction, design
- Aaron Rapoport – photography
- Sue Reilly – lettering
- Jeffrey Ross Music – management

== Certifications ==
Region	Certification	Certified units/sales
United States (RIAA)	Gold	500,000^{^}
^{^} Shipments figures based on certification alone.
