= I Don't Need Another Love =

Single by Dionne Warwick and The Spinners

from the album Greatest Hits: 1979–1990
- Released: March 1990
- Length: 4:11
- Label: Arista
- Songwriter(s): Mike Sutton; Brenda Sutton
- Producer(s): Nick Martinelli

Dionne Warwick singles chronology
"Take Good Care of You and Me" (1989)	"I Don't Need Another Love" (1990)	"It's All Over" (1991)

"I Don't Need Another Love" is a song by American singer Dionne Warwick and R&B group The Spinners. It was written by Mike and Brenda Sutton and recorded for Warwick's 1989 compilation album Greatest Hits: 1979–1990. Production was overseen by Nick Martinelli. "I Don't Need Another Love" peaked at number 84 on the US Hot R&B/Hip-Hop Songs.

== Track listings ==
7-inch single
No.	Title	Writer(s)	Producer(s)	Length
1.	"I Don't Need Another Love" (with The Spinners)	Mike Sutton; Brenda Sutton	Nick Martinelli	4:11
2.	"Heartbreaker"	Barry Gibb; Robin Gibb; Maurice Gibb	Gibb-Galuten-Richardson	4:16

== Credits and personnel ==
Credits lifted from the liner notes of Greatest Hits: 1979–1990.

- Brenda Sutton – writer
- Mike Sutton – writer
- Nick Martinelli – producer
- The Spinners – vocals
- Dionne Warwick – vocals

== Charts ==
Chart (1989)	Peak position
US Hot R&B/Hip-Hop Songs (Billboard)	84
