= Stone Love (Kashif song) =

1983 single by Kashif

Single by Kashif

from the album Kashif
- B-side: "Instrumental Version"
- Released: 1983
- Genre: Post-disco; R&B
- Length: 3:46
- Label: Arista
- Songwriter(s): Kashif
- Producer(s): Kashif; Morrie Brown

Kashif singles chronology
"I Just Gotta Have You (Lover Turn Me On)" (1983)	"Stone Love" (1983)	"Help Yourself to My Love" (1983)

"Stone Love" is a song by Kashif, released as a single in 1983 on Arista Records. This song peaked at No. 22 on the US Billboard Hot Black Singles chart.

== Critical reception ==
Craig Lytle of AllMusic wrote, ""Stone Love" commissions a funky bassline and seductive background vocals which contrast Kashif's zealous intonations."

== Charts ==
Chart (1983)	Peak position
US Hot Black Singles (Billboard)	22
