= Music from My Mind =

Studio album by Kashif
- Released: 2004
- Genre: Urban AC
- Length: 113:55
- Label: Brooklyn Boy Entertainment

Kashif chronology
Who Loves You? (1998)	Music from My Mind (2004)

Music from My Mind is the seventh and final studio album from the artist, producer and composer Michael Jones also known as Kashif. The album was released in 2004 on Brooklyn Boy Entertainment. A two-disc set, the first includes eight new songs while the second includes three new songs and a remastered version of Kashif, his debut album from 1983.

== Track listing ==
=== Disc 1 ===
#	Title	Writer(s)	Length
1.	I'm Down	Mabvuto Carpenter, Marcus Davis, Kashif	3:20
2.	Lover's Holiday	Marcus Elliott, Kashif	4:02
3.	You Make Me Swear	Kashif	4:41
4.	Black Woman (Nothin in the World Like A...)	Damien Harvey, Kashif, Marwan Abdullah	5:17
5.	Sexy Girls	Marcus Davis, Kashif	3:40
6.	So Emotional	Marwan Abdullah	4:38
7.	Mingo Weya	Gordon Blackwell, Kashif	10:00
8.	Superfly	Kashif, Marcus Davis, Percy Souder, Ronnell Davis	3:35
9.	Tossin' Turnin'	Marwan Abdullah, Ronell Davis	3:18
10.	He Don't Love You	Kashif, Ronell David	4:34
11.	I Don't Give a Damn	Kashif	4:34
12.	'Bout to Fall in Love	Kashif	4:34
13.	Just Get Along	Kashif	4:34

=== Disc 2 ===
#	Title	Writer(s)	Length
1.	Don't Stop My Love	Kashif	4:31
2.	Lover Turn Me On (I Just Got to Have You)	Kashif	5:43
3.	Stone Love	Kashif, La La	5:24
4.	Help Yourself to My Love	Paul Lawrence Jones III	4:39
5.	Say Something Love	Kashif	5:07
6.	The Mood	Kashif	4:07
7.	Rumors	Kashif	4:17
8.	All	Kashif, Alfonso Thorton, Fredd Zarr	4:10
9.	Sexy Girls	Marcus Davis, Kashif	3:30
10.	Beautiful Girls	Kashif	4:16
11.	Crazy Luv	Kashif, Marcus Davis, Ronell Davis, Terry Bolden	4:13
