= Who Loves You? =

Studio album by Kashif
- Released: 1998
- Genre: Urban AC
- Length: 53:30
- Label: Expansion
- Producer: Kashif, Gary Taylor

Kashif chronology
Kashif (1989)	Who Loves You? (1998)	Music from My Mind (2004)

Professional ratings
Review scores
Source	Rating
Allmusic	4/5 stars

Who Loves You?, released in 1998, is the sixth studio album from musician Kashif Saleem, released in 1998 on Expansion Records. The album includes two hits, "Bed You Down" and "Mingo Weya".

== Critical reception ==
Ed Hogan of Allmusic in a 3/5 star review wrote, "Kashif's credits includes chart-topping hits by Whitney Houston and Evelyn Champagne King as well as his own solo hits. On Who Loves You? his debut album for U.K. label Expansion Records, the singer/songwriter/keyboardist/producer pretty much sticks to the urban comtemporary sound he helped create in the '80s; though the grooves are tighter, he's grown vocally and there's a definite jazz vibe throughout (Wes Montgomery-ish guitar fills are sprinkled on almost every track) that's also influenced by hip-hop."

== Track listing ==
#	Title	Writer(s)	Length
1.	"Bed You Down"	Kashif	5:23
2.	"Good Ol' Days"	Gorden Blackwell, Kashif	5:08
3.	"Rhythm of My Mind"	Gary Taylor, Kashif	5:15
4.	"Brooklyn Breezes"	Kashif	4:03
5.	"I Don't Give a Damn"	Kashif	5:36
6.	"Mingo Weya"	Gorden Blackwell, Kashif	10:04
7.	"Can We Just Get Along"	Kashif	5:14
8.	"Lay You Down"	Kashif	4:55
9.	"It's Alright"	Gorden Blackwell, Kashif	3:18
10.	"Who Loves You? (It's Alright, pt. 2)"	Gorden Blackwell, Kashif	4:34

== Personnel ==
- Kashif – vocals, synthesizers, drum programming, arrangements
- Chris Clairmont – guitars (1, 3–10), additional guitars (2)
- Dwayne Higgins – guitars (2), backing vocals (2)
- Larry Kimpel – bass (4)
- Kenny McCloud – additional drum programming (1, 4, 7, 8)
- Michael White – drums (4)
- Sheila E. – percussion (9, 10)
- Gerald Albright – saxophone (3)
- David Hart – harmonica (4)
- Johnny Britt – trumpet (9, 10)
- Sandford Stein – string arrangements (7)
- Bridgette Fiddmont – backing vocals (1, 7, 8)
- Lynne Fiddmont – backing vocals (1, 5, 7, 8)
- Kimaya Seward – backing vocals (2, 5, 6, 9, 10)
- Monty Seward – backing vocals (2, 6, 9, 10)
- Gary Taylor – backing vocals (3)
- Liz Hogue – backing vocals (7)
