= Kashif (1989 album) =

Studio album by Kashif
- Released: 1989
- Length: 45:43
- Label: Arista
- Producer: Kashif

Kashif chronology
Love Changes (1987)	Kashif (1989)	Who Loves You? (1998)

Kashif is the fifth studio album by American singer Kashif, released by Arista Records in 1989. The album includes two hit singles, "Personality" and a cover of the 1973 hit "Ain't No Woman (Like the One I've Got)" by The Four Tops.

== Critical reception ==
USA Today wrote: "There are some good songs here, including two striking dance numbers, 'Personality' and the hypnotic cover of the Four Tops' 'Ain't No Woman (Like the One I Got)'."

== Track listing ==
No.	Title	Writer(s)	Producer(s)	Length
1.	"Personality"	Gina Gomez; Nick Mundy	Kashif; Mundy^{[a]}	4:06
2.	"Looking for a Lover"	Kashif; Mundy	Kashif; Mundy^{[a]}	5:00
3.	"Love Letter Out Loud"	Victor Bailey	Kashif; Bailey^{[a]}	5:10
4.	"Step into My World"	Kashif; Joi Cardwell; Denise Rich	Kashif	4:10
5.	"I'm Coming Home"	Oji Aquil; Taharqa Aleem; Tunde-Ra Aleem	Kashif; Taharqa Aleem^{[a]}; Tunde Ra Aleem^{[a]}	4:16
6.	"Ain't No Woman (Like the One I've Got)"	Dennis Lambert; Brian Potter	Kashif; Mundy^{[a]}	5:23
7.	"After You"	Randy Bowland	Kashif	4:36
8.	"My Door"	Kashif; Mundy	Kashif; Mundy^{[a]}	6:45
9.	"Pop the Question"	Kashif	Kashif	5:36

== Personnel ==
- Kashif – lead vocals, backing vocals, keyboards (1, 2, 6, 8, 9), drum programming (1, 2, 6, 8, 9), all instruments (3, 4, 5), Synclavier programming (4)
- Nick Mundy – keyboards (1, 2, 6, 8), drum programming (1, 2, 6, 8), backing vocals (1, 2, 6, 8)
- Taharqa Aleem – all instruments (5)
- Tunde-Ra Aleem – all instruments (5)
- Steve Lindsey – keyboards (6, 9)
- Monty Seward – keyboards (6, 7, 9), drum programming (6)
- Curtis Dowd – keyboards (7), drum programming (7)
- Nick Moroch – guitars (3)
- Ira Siegel – guitars (3)
- Randy Bowland – guitars (7), bass (7)
- Ray Fuller – guitars (7)
- Victor Bailey – bass (1), backing vocals (3)
- Allen McGrier – bass (4)
- Dwayne "Smitty" Smith – bass (7)
- Daniel Wilensky – saxophone solo (7)
- Prince Charles Alexander – Yamaha WX7 solo (9)
- Kim "Eurisa" Davis – backing vocals (1, 9)
- Sandra St. Victor – backing vocals (2, 3, 6, 8)
- Rick Oriol – party voice (2)
- Joi Cardwell – backing vocals (4)
- Leroy Burgess – backing vocals (5)
- Lori Fulton – backing vocals (7)
- Cindy Mizelle – backing vocals (8)

Technical and Design

- Prince Charles Alexander – recording (1–4, 6–9), mixing (1–4, 6, 8, 9)
- Earl Cohen – recording (3), mixing (3)
- Steve Goldman – recording (3, 5), mixing (5, 7)
- Oswald Bowe – assistant engineer (1)
- Tom Callahan – assistant engineer (1, 6)
- George Mayers Jr. – assistant engineer (1)
- Ernie Perez – assistant engineer (1, 2, 4, 6, 7, 8)
- Roy Sweeting – assistant engineer (1)
- Chris Furhman – assistant engineer (2, 4, 6, 8, 9), additional engineer (6, 7)
- Joel Iwataki – assistant engineer (2, 4, 6, 8)
- Mitchell Osias – assistant engineer (2)
- Alejandro Rodriguez – assistant engineer (2, 6, 7)
- Kevin Thomas – assistant engineer (2, 6, 8, 9)
- Angela R. Dryden – assistant engineer (3, 5, 9)
- Dug Larsen – assistant engineer (3, 5, 9), additional engineer (5)
- Maurice Puerto – assistant engineer (3)
- Christopher Savino – assistant engineer (3)
- Vince Caro – assistant engineer (4, 6)
- Rob Harvey – assistant engineer (4)
- Robin Laine – assistant engineer (4, 6, 9)
- Ray Pyle – assistant engineer (6)
- Anthony Saunders – assistant engineer (7)
- Nick Els – assistant engineer (9)
- David Schober – additional engineer (6)
- Will Rogers – additional engineer (7)
- Adrian Salley – production coordinator
- David Brubaker – design
- Adrian Buckmaster – photography

== Charts ==
Chart (1989)	Peak position
US Top R&B/Hip-Hop Albums (Billboard)	29
