= Kashif =

Kashif (also spelled Kaashif, Kaşif, Khasif, Kashef or Kawshif, Arabic: كاشف) is an Arabic word, commonly used as a male given name in the Muslim world. Its meaning is close to the "revealer", "discoverer", "uncoverer" or "pioneer", "explorer".

When used by Muslims, it is done so in the context of its Qur'anic usage referring to God as "the One who reveals." When applied to an individual, it means that the person has the quality of spiritual vision. The truth is obvious to them while hidden to others. For example, in the Qur'an (Surah Al-Sajdah Chapter 32: Verse 13), God refers to a people who have just died and suddenly see the error of their ways and the purpose of life which previously eluded them. After this realization, they ask God to send them back, as they now believe and want to do good works. Those who are "Kashif" have that understanding before death.

== Given name ==
- Kashif (musician) (1956–2016), American musician and singer
- Kashif Abbasi (born 1974), Pakistani journalist
- Kashif Ahmed (born 1975), Pakistani and United Arab Emirates cricketer
- Kashif Bangnagande (born 2001), Japanese footballer
- Kashif Bhatti (born 1986), Pakistani cricketer
- Kashif Daud (born 1986), Pakistani cricketer
- Kashif Ibrahim (born 1977), Pakistani cricketer
- Kashif Jawad (born 1981), Pakistani field hockey player
- Kashif Naved (born 1983), Pakistani cricketer
- Kashif Nisar, Pakistani television director and screenwriter
- Kashif Raza (born 1979), Pakistani cricketer
- Kashif Shafi (born 1976), Pakistani cricketer
- Kashif Shah (born 1993), Pakistani field hockey player
- Kashif Sharif (born 1987), Kuwaiti cricketer
- Kashif Shuja (born 1979), Pakistani-born New Zealand squash player
- Kashif Siddiq (born 1981), Pakistani cricketer
- Kashif Siddiqi (born 1986), English-born Pakistani footballer
- Kashif Mahmood (cricketer, born 1995), Pakistani cricketer

== Surname ==
- Hameed Kashif (born 1977), American basketball player
- Ibrahim al Kashif (1915–1969), Sudanese singer popular 1940–1956
- Malak al-Kashif (born 1999), Egyptian transgender activist
- Mohammad Kashif (Dutch cricketer) (born 1984), Dutch cricketer from Punjab
- Tolga Kashif (born 1962), Turkish-Cypriot composer from London
