= Kashif Mahmood (cricketer, born 1995) =

Pakistani cricketer (born 1995)

Kashif Mahmood (Pakistani Cricketer)
Personal information
- Full name: Kashif Mahmood
- Born: 6 September 1995 (age 31)
- Batting: Right handed
- Bowling: Right-arm medium
- Source: Cricinfo, 17 June 2021

Kashif Mahmood (born 6 September 1995) is a former Pakistani cricketer who played first-class cricket. He played his two first-class matches for Sialkot Stallions.
