= Kashif, Syria =

Kashif الكشف
- Village
- Location within Syria
- Coordinates: 34.399°N 36.838°E
- Country: Syria
- Governorate: Homs
- District: Homs
- Subdistrict: Hisyah
- Time zone: UTC+2 (EET)
  - Summer (DST): UTC+3 (EEST)

Kashif (Arabic: الكشف) is a village in western Syria, administratively part of the Homs Governorate.
