= Kashif (1983 album) =

Studio album by Kashif
- Released: February 22, 1983
- Recorded: 1982
- Studios: Celestial Studios, New York City
- Genre: Post-disco
- Length: 63:24
- Label: Arista
- Producers: Kashif; Morrie Brown

Kashif chronology
Kashif (1983)	Send Me Your Love (1984)

Kashif is the self-titled debut album by American singer Kashif. Produced by Kashif and Morrie Brown, it was released by Arista Records on February 22, 1983, in the United States, following his departure from the funk/disco group B. T. Express. The album reached number ten on the US Top R&B/Hip-Hop Albums chart and spawned the top five single "I Just Gotta Have You (Lover Turn Me On)." Kashif also includes the singles "Stone Love", "Help Yourself to My Love" and "Say Something Love". The album was digitally remastered by Funky Town Grooves in 2012 and includes five additional tracks.

== Critical reception ==
Professional ratings
Review scores
Source	Rating
AllMusic	4/5 stars
The Village Voice	C+

AllMusic editor Craig Lytle found that "this album has one good composition after another. Kashif's adamant deliveries are poisely contrasted by cooing background. Though there are no authentic string and horn ensemble, the former B.T. Express member gets optimal use of his synthesizers and keyboards. This is an excellent debut." Robert Christgau gave the album a C+ rating and wrote in his "Consumer Guide" column in The Village Voice: "As if he were Dick Griffey or somebody, admirers cite the radio appeal of this Brooklyn pheenom's smooth concoctions and recall the heroic deeds of Berry Gordy. Whether that rings true with you depends on whether you value the radio of the '80s as much as that of the '60s."

== Track listing ==
All tracks produced by Kashif and Morrie Brown.

Side one
No.	Title	Writer(s)	Length
1.	"Don't Stop My Love"	Kashif	4:32
2.	"Stone Love"	Kashif; La La	5:26
3.	"I Just Gotta Have You (Lover Turn Me On)"	Kashif	5:48
4.	"Help Yourself to My Love"	Paul Lawrence Jones III	4:02

Side two
No.	Title	Writer(s)	Length
5.	"Rumors"	Kashif	4:16
6.	"Say Somethin' Love"	Kashif	5:08
7.	"The Mood"	Kashif	4:10
8.	"All"	Kashif; Alfonso Thornton; Fred Zarr	4:10

Funky Town Grooves reissue (2012) bonus tracks
No.	Title	Writer(s)	Length
9.	"Help Yourself to My Love" (12" Version)	Jones	4:41
10.	"I Just Gotta Have You (Lover Turn Me On)" (Instrumental)	Kashif	5:52
11.	"I Just Gotta Have You (Lover Turn Me On)" (Single Version)	Kashif	4:50
12.	"Stone Love" (Instrumental)	Kashif; La La	5:23
13.	"Say Somethin' Love" (Single Version)	Kashif	4:39

== Personnel ==
- Kashif – arrangements, lead vocals (1–5), all other instruments (1, 4, 5, 6), acoustic piano (2, 6), Fender Rhodes (2, 3, 4, 6, 8), Oberheim OB-Xa (2, 3, 6, 8), backing vocals (2, 3, 4, 6), Moog bass (3), drums (3, 4, 6), percussion (3, 4), Moog synthesizer (4, 8), all instruments (7), finger snaps (7), voice (7), all vocals (8)
- Ralph Schuckett – keyboards (2, 8), arrangements (8)
- Paul Laurence – Fender Rhodes (4)
- Ira Siegel – guitars (1–6, 8)
- Ronny Drayton – guitars (3)
- Wayne Braithwaite – bass (2, 8)
- Leslie Ming – drums (1, 2, 3, 5, 8)
- Trevor Gale – drums (8)
- Andy Newmark – drums (8)
- Bashiri Johnson – percussion (1, 2, 5, 8)
- Robin Dunn – finger snaps (7)
- Kevin Harewood – finger snaps (7)
- Freda Payne – finger snaps (7)
- Kenny G – saxophone solo (6)
- B.J. Nelson – backing vocals (1, 2, 4, 5), additional backing vocals (3)
- Lillo Thomas – backing vocals (1–5)
- Evelyn "Champagne" King – backing vocals (2, 3)
- Brenda White – backing vocals (2, 4)
- Michelle Cobbs – additional backing vocals (3), backing vocals (6)
- Fonzi Thornton – additional backing vocals (3), backing vocals (4)
- Tawatha Agee – backing vocals (4)
- Philip Ballou – backing vocals (4)
- La La – lead vocals (4)
- Latifa – backing vocals (6)

== Production ==
- Kashif – producer, front cover stylist
- Morrie Brown – producer
- Steve Goldman – chief engineer
- Larry Alexander – additional engineer
- Chuck Ange – additional engineer
- Michael Barbiero – additional engineer
- Larry DeCarmine – assistant engineer
- Dennis O'Donnell – assistant engineer
- Don Peterkofsky – additional assistant engineer
- John Wright – additional assistant engineer
- Herb Powers Jr. – mastering at Frankford/Wayne Mastering Labs (New York, NY)
- Kate Jansen – production administrator
- Dana Lester – production administrator
- Donn Davenport – art direction
- Sam Gibson – front cover photography
- Rotem – back cover photography
- Latifa – front cover stylist
- Debbie Engelsmsn – back cover stylist
- Michael Robinson – hair stylist
- Fran Cooper – make-up
- Hush Productions and The New Music Group, Inc. – management

== Charts ==
Chart (1983)	Peak position
US Billboard 200	54
US Top R&B/Hip-Hop Albums (Billboard)	10
