= Love Power (Dionne Warwick song) =

Single by Dionne Warwick and Jeffrey Osborne

from the album Reservations for Two
- B-side: "In a World Such as This"
- Released: June 1987
- Length: 4:32
- Label: Arista
- Songwriters: Burt Bacharach; Carole Bayer Sager
- Producers: Burt Bacharach; Carole Bayer Sager

Dionne Warwick singles chronology
"Whisper in the Dark" (1986)	"Love Power" (1987)	"Reservations for Two" (1987)

"Love Power" is a song by American singers Dionne Warwick and Jeffrey Osborne. It was written and produced by Burt Bacharach and Carole Bayer Sager for Warwick's studio album, Reservations for Two (1987), and features an appearance by Kenny G playing the alto sax solo. Released as its lead single, it became Warwick's sixth number-one hit on the US Billboard Adult Contemporary chart. The track also reached number 12 on the Billboard Hot 100. "Love Power" marked her final appearance in the top 40 on the latter chart. For Osborne, "Love Power" was his only number-one Adult Contemporary hit, and it would be his last appearance in the Billboard Hot 100 top 40 as well, since "She's On the Left," his only number-one R&B hit, would only reach number 48 on that same chart the following year. In 1994, heavy metal singers Glenn Danzig and Lita Ford sang a cover version of the song during the 1994 Grammy Awards ceremony.

== Track listings ==
12-inch single
No.	Title	Writer(s)	Producer(s)	Length
1.	"Love Power" (duet with Jeffrey Osborne)	Burt Bacharach; Carole Bayer Sager	Bacharach; Sager	4:32
2.	"No One in the World"	Ken Hirsch; Martha Sharron	Barry Manilow	3:33
3.	"In a World Such as This"	Bacharach; Sager; Bruce Roberts	Bacharach; Sager	4:16

== Personnel ==
Credits lifted from the liner notes of Reservations for Two.

Musicians

- Dionne Warwick – lead vocals
- Jeffrey Osborne – lead vocals
- Kenny G – alto saxophone solo
- Greg Phillinganes – keyboards
- David Foster – synthesizers
- Burt Bacharach – additional synthesizers
- Robbie Buchanan – additional synthesizers
- David Boruff – synthesizer programming
- Dann Huff – guitars
- Nathan East – bass
- Carlos Vega – drums
- Tim Feehan – backing vocals
- Joe Pizzulo – backing vocals

Production

- Clive Davis – executive producer
- Burt Bacharach – producer
- Carole Bayer Sager – producer
- Frank DeCaro – musical contractor
- Mick Guzauski – engineer, mixing
- Daren Klein – additional engineer
- Tommy Vicari – additional engineer
- Marnie Riley – assistant engineer
- Gary Wagner – assistant engineer
- Bernie Grundman – mastering
- Maude Gilman – art direction
- Ann Petter – design
- Harry Langdon – photography
- Luiz Archer – fashion stylist
- Clifford Peterson – hairdresser
- Wynona Price – make–up

== Charts ==
Chart (1987)	Peak position
Canada Adult Contemporary (RPM)	5
UK Singles (Official Charts)	63
US Adult Contemporary (Billboard)	1
US Billboard Hot 100	12
US Hot R&B/Hip-Hop Songs (Billboard)	5
US Cash Box Top 100	11
