= Kenny G =

American jazz saxophonist and composer (born 1956)

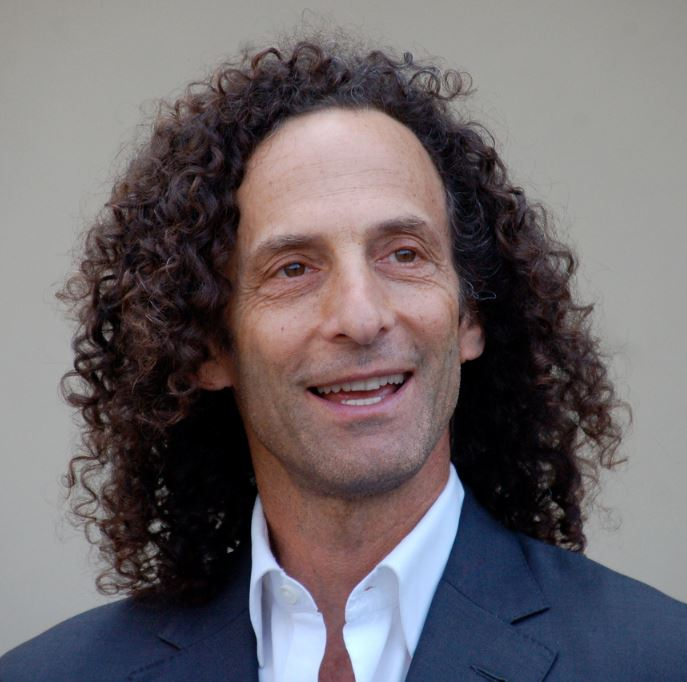
- Kenny G in 2013
- Born: Kenneth Bruce Gorelick; June 5, 1956 (age 70); Seattle, Washington, U.S.
- Education: University of Washington
- Occupations: Saxophonist; songwriter; record producer
- Years active: 1973–present
- Spouses: Janice DeLeon (m. 1980; div. 1987) Lyndie Benson (m. 1992; div. 2012)
- Children: 2
- Awards: Full list
- Musical career
- Genres: Adult contemporary; smooth jazz; easy listening
- Instruments: Saxophone; flute; clarinet
- Works: Kenny G discography
- Labels: Concord; Starbucks; Arista
- Website: kennyg.com

Kenneth Bruce Gorelick (born June 5, 1956) is an American smooth jazz saxophonist, composer, and record producer. His 1986 album Duotones brought him commercial success. Kenny G is one of the best-selling artists of all time, with global sales totaling more than 75 million records, making him also the best-selling non-vocal musician in history.

Gorelick was born in Seattle, Washington and started playing the saxophone at the age of ten, inspired by a performance on The Ed Sullivan Show. He attended several schools in Seattle, including the University of Washington. During high school, he took private saxophone lessons and played in the school jazz band.

Kenny G's professional career began with Barry White's The Love Unlimited Orchestra at age 17. He played with the Seattle funk band Cold, Bold & Together before joining the Jeff Lorber Fusion in 1980. His solo career took off after signing with Arista Records in 1982. His debut album, Kenny G, was recorded with members of the Jeff Lorber Fusion and released in 1982. Kenny G's fourth solo album, Duotones (1986), marked the start of his most commercially successful period, featuring the hit single "Songbird". His 1992 album, Breathless, became the best-selling instrumental album ever, and his first holiday album, Miracles: The Holiday Album, sold over 13 million copies. He has worked on soundtracks for films such as The Bodyguard and collaborated with artists, including Andrea Bocelli and Frank Sinatra.

In the 2000s and 2010s, Kenny G released several albums, including Paradise and Brazilian Nights. He made appearances in commercials and music videos and continued to perform worldwide. Kenny G is particularly popular in China, with his song "Going Home" widely used in public places. Despite facing criticism from some jazz musicians, Kenny G remains a highly successful and influential figure in contemporary instrumental music.

== Early life ==
Kenneth Bruce Gorelick was born in Seattle, Washington to a Jewish family. His mother was a Canadian Jew from Saskatchewan. He came into contact with the saxophone when he heard a performance on The Ed Sullivan Show. He started playing the saxophone, a Buffet Crampon alto, in 1966 when he was 10 years old.

He attended Whitworth Elementary School, Sharples Junior High School (since renamed Kurose Middle School), Franklin High School, and the University of Washington, all in his home city of Seattle. When he entered high school, he failed at his first attempt to get into the jazz band but auditioned again the following year and earned first chair. His Franklin High School classmate Robert Damper (piano, keyboards) plays in his band. In addition to his studies while in high school, he took private lessons on the saxophone and clarinet from Johnny Jessen, once a week for a year.

== Career ==
=== Early career ===
Kenny G's career started with a job as a sideman for Barry White's Love Unlimited Orchestra in 1973, when he was 17 and still in high school. He continued to play professionally while studying for a major in accounting at the University of Washington in Seattle, and graduated Phi Beta Kappa and magna cum laude. He qualified, and only needed to pass the CPA exam to get into practice.

Using the name Kenny Gorelick, he played flute and saxophones with the Seattle funk band Cold, Bold & Together during 1975–1976 before becoming a credited member of the Jeff Lorber Fusion in 1980. He then left the band, later stating that he had outgrown them.

=== 1980s: Start of solo career, Duotones, and Silhouette ===
Kenny G signed with Arista Records as a solo artist in 1982, after label president Clive Davis heard his rendition of "Dancing Queen" by ABBA. He adopted Kenny G as his stage name because it "had a nice ring to it". His debut studio album, Kenny G, was recorded in 1981 with members of the Jeff Lorber Fusion, and released in the following year. The album received warm reviews from critics, and reached No. 10 on the Billboard Jazz Albums chart. Kenny G followed his debut with G Force in January 1983 and Gravity in May 1985, both of which reached Platinum certification in the US for selling one million copies. During this time, he collaborated with musician, singer, songwriter, and producer Kashif on many tracks, including the 1985 single "Love on the Rise".

In 1986, Kenny G entered the most commercially successful period of his career. His fourth solo album, Duotones, was released in September 1986 and features an original instrumental track, "Songbird", inspired by his decision to move from Seattle to Los Angeles, which marked the start of a new life for him. The album went on to sell five million copies in the US alone and increased his profile worldwide as a result. "Songbird" reached No. 4 on the Billboard Hot 100 and the lead single, "Don't Make Me Wait for Love", featuring Lenny Williams on lead vocals, went to No. 15 on the Hot 100 and No. 2 on the Billboard Adult Contemporary chart in 1987.

Kenny G worked in the mid-to-late 1980s with jazz and R&B artists such as George Benson, Patti LaBelle and Aretha Franklin. The 1987 hit single "Love Power", a Dionne Warwick duet with Jeffrey Osborne that featured G as a guest saxophonist, peaked at No. 12 on the Billboard Hot 100, and No. 5 on R&B/Hip-Hop songs.

His first live album, Kenny G Live, included popular songs, among which "Going Home" achieved great success in the People's Republic of China. Kenny G has collaborated with a wide variety of artists, such as Andrea Bocelli, Aaron Neville, Toni Braxton, DJ Jazzy Jeff & The Fresh Prince, Natalie Cole, Steve Miller, Weezer, Dudley Moore, Lee Ritenour, The Rippingtons, Michael Bolton, Celine Dion, Frank Sinatra, Bebel Gilberto, and Smokey Robinson. Influenced by saxophonist Grover Washington Jr., his albums are usually classified as smooth jazz.

=== 1990s: Breathless, Miracles, and The Moment ===
Kenny G has worked on several film soundtracks, including Dying Young and The Bodyguard. The song "Theme for Dying Young", written for that movie, was nominated for the Grammy for Best Pop Instrumental Performance. Kenny G appears on the soundtrack of The Bodyguard, starring Kevin Costner and Whitney Houston, performing "Waiting for You" and "Even If My Heart Would Break". His music was also included in The Shadow and Miracle on 34th Street.

His sixth studio album, Breathless, was released in 1992, and went on to become the best-selling instrumental album ever, with over 15 million copies sold worldwide, selling 12 million copies in the United States alone. The album included many hits such as "Forever in Love", the recipient of the Grammy Award for the Best Instrumental Composition and which charted in the Billboard Year-End Hot 100. "Sentimental" charted at No. 27 on the Adult Contemporary Chart, and "By the Time This Night Is Over", a collaboration with Peabo Bryson, peaked at No. 25 on the Hot 100.

His first holiday album, Miracles, sold over 13 million copies, making it the most successful Christmas album to date. He also performed the "National Anthem of the United States" at the 1994 FIFA World Cup closing ceremony at the Rose Bowl in Pasadena, California, on July 17, 1994.

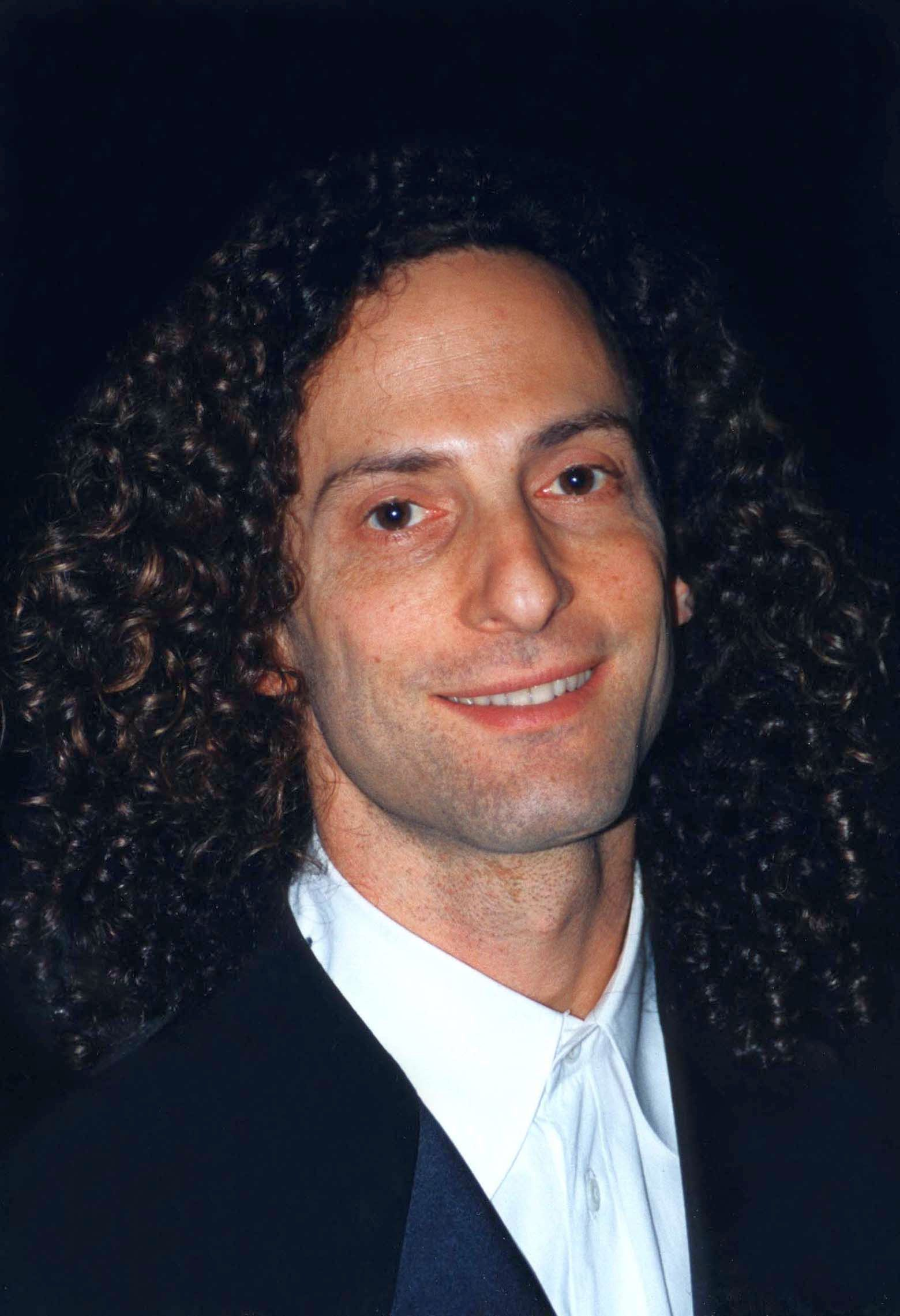
Kenny G in 1998

Kenny G earned a place in the Guinness Book of World Records in 1997 for playing the longest note ever recorded on a saxophone. Using circular breathing, Kenny G held an E-flat for 45 minutes and 47 seconds at J&R Music World in New York City. The same year, his song "Havana", from the album The Moment, was remixed by Todd Terry and Tony Moran and released to dance clubs in the U.S. The mixes went to No. 1 on the Billboard Dance/Club Play Songs chart in April 1997.

Kenny G's second holiday album, Faith, is the best selling holiday album of 1999 in the United States selling 2 million units according to Nielsen/SoundScan. The singles taken from the album, the traditional "Auld Lang Syne", reached No. 7 on the Hot 100. His rendition of "Auld Lang Syne" was, at the time of charting, popularized by the then-upcoming New Year celebration for 2000. At the time of its peak, it was also the oldest-written song to make the Hot 100 charts.

=== 2000s ===
In February 2000, Kenny G was invited to the White House and performed for state governors and members of the Clinton Cabinet.

He released his eighth studio album, Paradise in 2002. The album featured R&B singer Brian McKnight and included the single "One More Time", a duet with Chanté Moore.

On At Last...The Duets Album, he collaborated with friends and colleagues David Sanborn, David Benoit; Daryl Hall, lead singer of Hall & Oates; Burt Bacharach, and Barbra Streisand. It includes covers such as Careless Whisper, and Elton John's "Sorry Seems to Be the Hardest Word", a collaboration with Richard Marx. The album is certified Gold in the US.

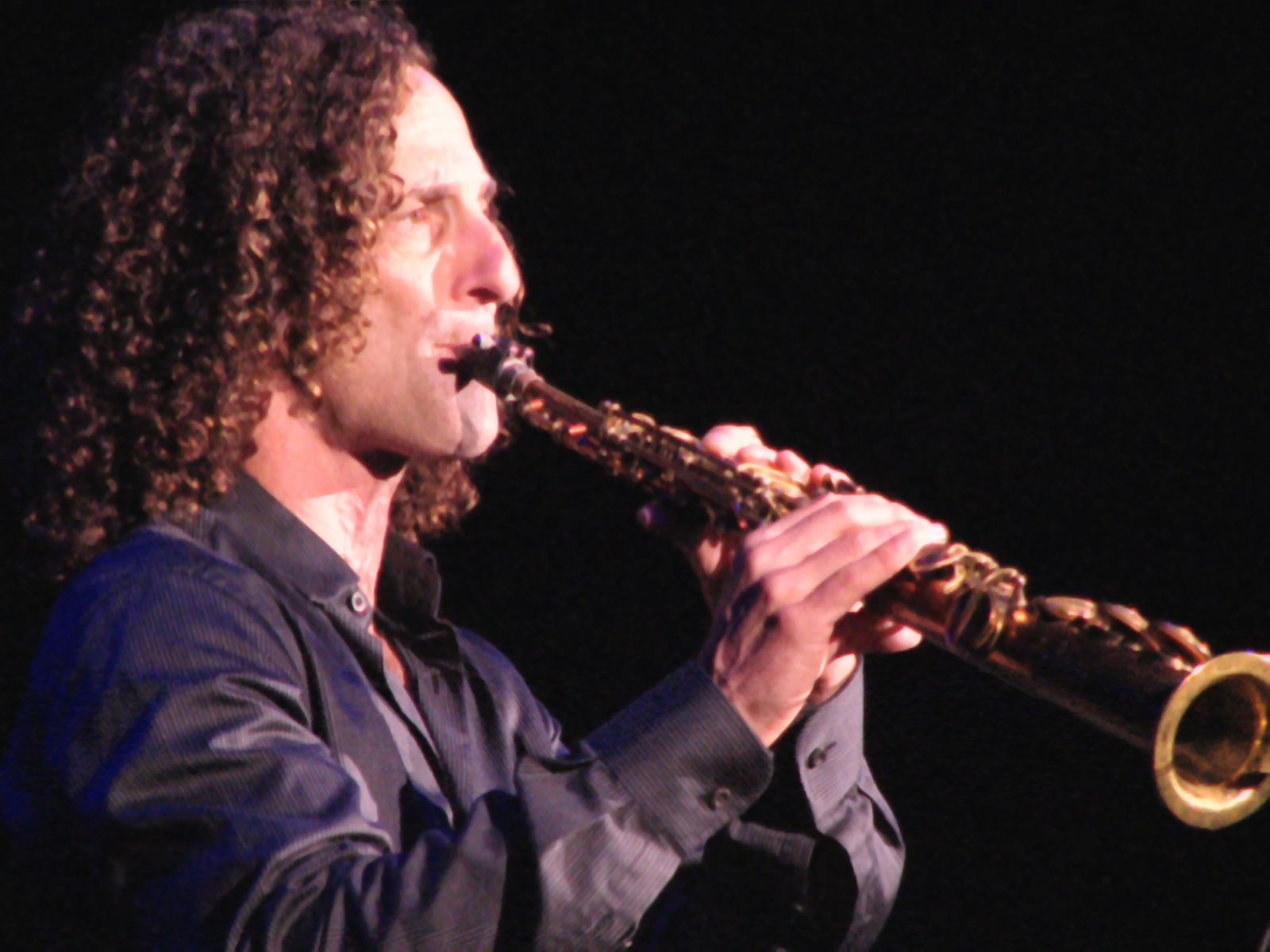
Kenny G playing in Shanghai in 2007

In 2006, Kenny G released his eleventh studio album, entitled I'm in the Mood for Love...The Most Romantic Melodies of All Time featuring renditions of The Beatles's songs, the love theme from Shakespeare's Romeo and Juliet, the Secret Garden's hit song "You Raise Me Up", and James Blunt's "You're Beautiful", as well as the Chinese ballad "The Moon Represents My Heart".

Kenny G was named the 25th highest-selling artist in America by the RIAA, with 48 million albums sold in the U.S. as of July 31, 2006.

In October 2009, Kenny G appeared with the band Weezer in an AOL promotion of their album Raditude by soloing during "I'm Your Daddy". Kenny G said he knew nothing of Weezer before the performance. Though some music critics thereby rejoined in the common criticism of his work, the unlikely combination was fairly well received by AOL's magazines Spinner.com and Popeater.com.

=== 2010s ===
His 2010 album Heart and Soul is strongly influenced by R&B, featuring Robin Thicke and his long-time collaborator Babyface. It received positive reviews from critics.

In February 2011, Kenny G appeared in the Super Bowl XLV ad for Audi called "Release the Hounds". He starred in a short as Head of Riot Suppression for a luxury Prison.

He made an appearance in the music video for Katy Perry's single "Last Friday Night (T.G.I.F.)" as Uncle Kenny. On the October 8, 2011 episode of Saturday Night Live, he performed with alternative rock band Foster the People on the song "Houdini".

Kenny G hosts a radio show with Sandy Kovach on WLOQ in Orlando.

His Brazilian Nights was announced on October 28, 2014. The album was inspired by Cannonball Adderley's bossa nova recordings, Paul Desmond, and Stan Getz. The album was released in January 2015. It helped Kenny G get back to the Billboard 200 at number 86. He started The Brazilian Tour for the album, traveling throughout North America and Asia throughout the year.

Kenny G posted Twitter images of his visit to the site of the 2014 Hong Kong protests, which the PRC government has declared illegal, saying, "I wish everyone a peaceful and positive conclusion to this situation". The feed provoked an immediate angry reaction from the Chinese foreign ministry. Kenny G issued a clarification, "I don't really know anything about the situation and my impromptu visit to the site was just part of an innocent walk around Hong Kong...I only wanted to share my wish for peace for Hong Kong and for all of China as I feel close to and care about China very much".

In February 2017, Kenny G was satirized by Andy Samberg in the Netflix program "Michael Bolton's Big, Sexy Valentine's Day Special". At the end of the scene, Kenny G appears as a janitor. He competed in an episode of Drop the Mic against country singer Jake Owen.

In October 2019, Kenny G appeared on the Kanye West gospel album Jesus Is King, on the song "Use This Gospel". Reaching 37 on the Billboard Hot 100, the song was his first entry on the chart since 2000 and resulted in his becoming one of just five artists—alongside Michael Jackson, Madonna, U2 and "Weird Al" Yankovic—to have appeared in the top 40 every decade from the 1980s to the 2010s.

=== 2020s ===
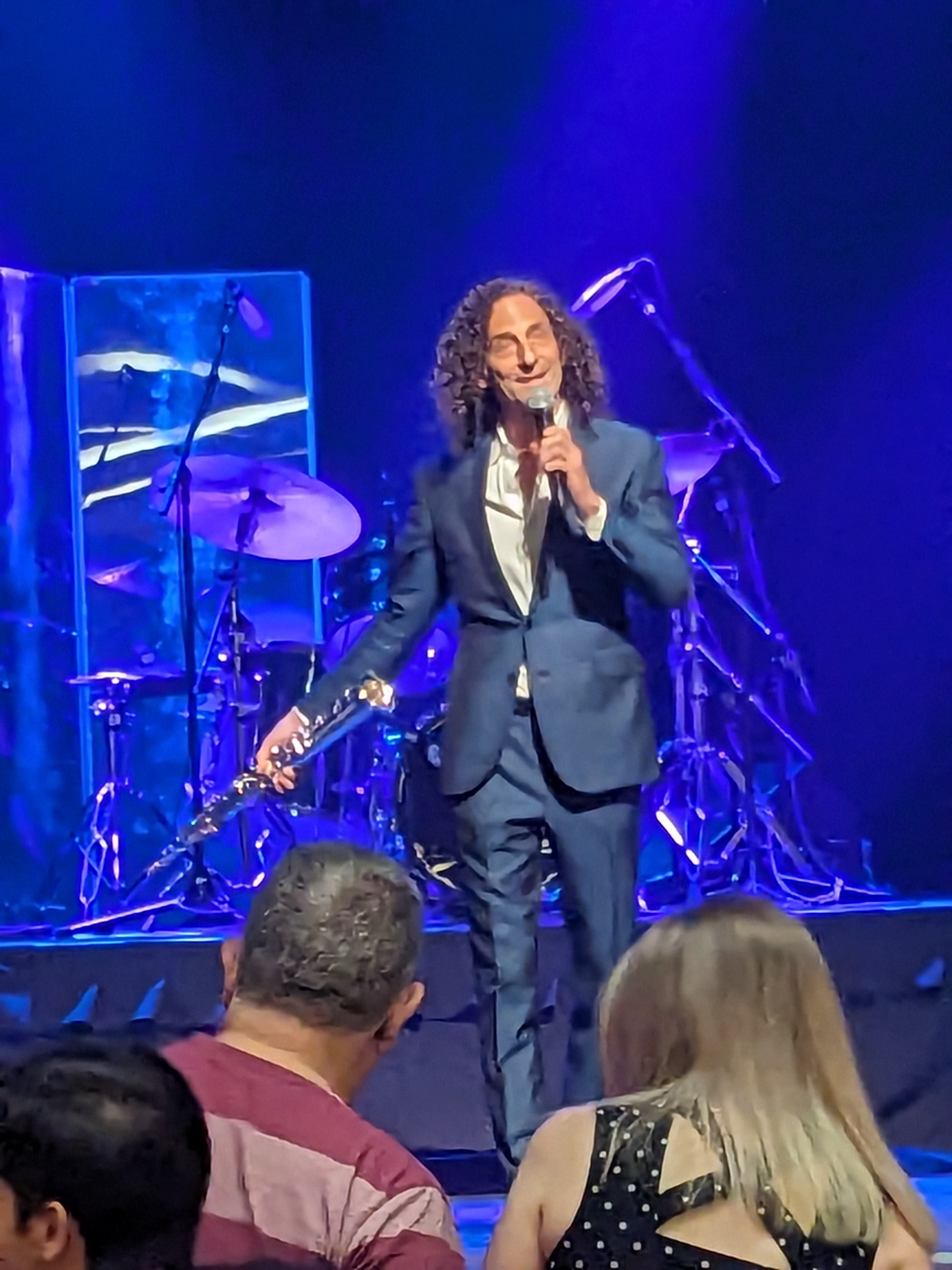
Kenny G onstage before his concert at People's Bank Theatre, Marietta, Ohio, on 9 July 2023, announcing that one of his saxophones would be auctioned for charity

In October 2020, the Weeknd released a remix of the popular song "In Your Eyes" featuring Kenny G.

Kenny G contributed to the soundtrack of The SpongeBob Movie: Sponge on the Run in 2021 with his covers of "My Heart Will Go On" as well as "Gary's Song", which had been written for the SpongeBob SquarePants episode "Have You Seen This Snail?" The Nickelodeon series parodies the artist with the character Kelpy G.

In 2022, he appeared on avant-garde metal band Imperial Triumphant's song "Merkurius Gilded" alongside his son Max Gorelick on guitar.

Kenny G is featured on saxophone on the song "Cry" from American singer Charlie Puth's 2026 album Whatever's Clever!. The song was released as a single on February 6, 2026, prior to Puth's performance of "The Star-Spangled Banner" at Super Bowl LX in Santa Clara, California, during which he was accompanied by Kenny G on saxophone.

== Popularity in China ==
Kenny G has recorded Chinese songs such as "Jasmine Flower" (茉莉花) and "The Moon Represents My Heart" (月亮代表我的心).

Since 1989, Kenny G's recording "Going Home" from the Kenny G Live album has become an unconventional mega-hit throughout China: It has become the unofficial national closing song for many businesses such as food courts, outdoor markets, health clubs, shopping malls and train stations throughout the country. Many businesses begin piping the music over their loudspeakers shortly before closing at night. Television stations also play the song before ending their evening broadcasts. Many Chinese, when asked, say they associate the song with the need to finish their activity or business and go home (although they may not even know the name of the song or its artist).

== Criticism ==
Kenny G has attracted criticism from mainstream jazz musicians and enthusiasts. Pat Metheny opined that G has a simplistic musical vocabulary, and that his high record sales do not match his talent level. In a JazzTimes poll, critic Josef Woodard found Kenny G serving "a noble purpose by offering musicians a paradigm of what not to do".

Kenny G's 1999 single "What a Wonderful World" was criticized for his overdubbing onto Louis Armstrong's original recording. Mark Sabbatini of All About Jazz considered it an "unconscionable act of auditory graffiti". Ben Ratliff of The New York Times said the original recording should not be altered by a musician "whose range and depth of understanding was already in question." Saxophonist Charles McPherson expressed "mixed feelings", stating that Kenny G's "audience probably does not know Armstrong or Getz or Charlie Parker. So, if he feels like his audience should be more familiar with those people, I can't see anything aesthetically wrong with that." Pianist Fred Hersch bluntly stated that Kenny G is "not a jazz musician."

Saxophonist Branford Marsalis defended G, saying "they need to leave Kenny alone. He's not stealing jazz. The audience he has wouldn't be caught dead at a real jazz concert or club. It's not like some guy says, 'You know, I used to listen to Miles, Trane and Ornette. And then I heard Kenny G, and I never put on another Miles record.' It's a completely different audience."

In 2021, HBO released a documentary on Kenny G, Listening to Kenny G, directed by Penny Lane, who stated she chose Kenny G as her subject because he is "a musician who is objectively popular, by way of record sales, but is also hated by the 'critical class'." When asked in the film what he loves about music, Kenny G says, "I don't know if I love music that much...when I listen to music, I think about the musicians and I just think about what it takes to make that music and how much they had to practice." Richard Brody of The New Yorker called G's response a "slap to the face" of musicians and music lovers.

== Equipment ==
Kenny G plays the Selmer Mark VI soprano, alto and tenor saxophones. He has created his own line of saxophones called "Kenny G Saxophones".

== Personal life ==
Kenny G married Janice DeLeon in 1980, and they divorced in 1987. He married Lyndie Benson in 1992, and the couple had two sons. His son Max was the guitarist for the experimental metal band Imperial Triumphant in 2016. In January 2012, Benson-Gorelick filed for legal separation. Kenny G filed for divorce in August 2012.

Kenny G built a house in Hunts Point, Washington, in 1996 which he sold in 1999 to Craig McCaw. Kenny G now lives in Malibu, California. He is an avid golfer and has a handicap of +0.6. He has participated in the AT&T Pebble Beach National Pro-Am tournament seven times as of 2007, and he teamed up with Phil Mickelson to share the AT&T pro-am title in 2001 with the team of Tiger Woods and Jerry Chang. In the Golf Digest rankings of Top 100 in Music, according to golf handicap indexes of major musicians, he was first in 2006 and second in 2008. He is a member of Sherwood Country Club in Thousand Oaks, California.

Kenny G is an aircraft pilot. He has a De Havilland Beaver seaplane, which he flew regularly as of 2006. He is a personal friend of former Starbucks chairman and chief executive officer Howard Schultz and was an early investor in the coffeehouse chain.

== Discography ==
Studio albums

- Kenny G (1982)
- G Force (1983)
- Gravity (1985)
- Duotones (1986)
- Silhouette (1988)
- Breathless (1992)
- Miracles: The Holiday Album (1994)
- The Moment (1996)
- Classics in the Key of G (1999)
- Faith: A Holiday Album (1999)
- Paradise (2002)
- At Last...The Duets Album (2004)
- I'm in the Mood for Love...The Most Romantic Melodies of All Time (2006)
- Rhythm and Romance (2008)
- Heart and Soul (2010)
- Namaste with Rahul Sharma (2012)
- Brazilian Nights (2015)
- New Standards (2021)
- Innocence (2023)

== Concert tours ==
Headlining

- Brazilian Tour (2015)
- The Miracles Holiday & Hits Tour (2017)

Co-headlining

- Moment of Truth World Tour with Whitney Houston (1987)
- Secrets Tour with Toni Braxton (1996)
- The Hits Tour with Toni Braxton (2016)
- The Breezin' & Breathless Tour with George Benson (2017)
