= Kashif (musician) =

American musician (1956–2016)

- Kashif in 1985
- Born: Michael Jones; December 26, 1956; New York City, U.S.
- Died: September 25, 2016 (aged 59); Playa del Rey, California, United States
- Other name: Kashif Saleem
- Occupations: Singer; musician
- Musical career
- Genres: R&B; boogie; post-disco; jazz; soul
- Instruments: Synthesizer; keyboards; vocals
- Years active: 1974–2016
- Labels: Arista; Brooklyn Boy

Kashif Saleem (born Michael Jones; December 26, 1956 – September 25, 2016) was an American singer, songwriter, and record producer from New York City. As a teenager, Kashif joined the funk group B. T. Express. He studied Islam and changed his name from Michael Jones to Kashif. He later signed with Arista Records enjoying success as a solo artist.

Together with Stevie Wonder, he was considered a pioneer in urban music thanks to his specific synthesizer technology approach and the introduction of MIDI in his production.

== Early life ==
Kashif was born Michael Jones on December 26, 1956 (Some media outlets list his birth year as 1959), in the Harlem neighborhood of New York City. His only connection to his birth family is his birth certificate, which indicates that his biological mother was incarcerated when he was four months old. He was immediately put in foster care. He was constantly abused physically and mentally by his foster parents, and at the age of six, he moved into a more stable foster home. His introduction to music came in the form of a $3.00 song flute when he was in elementary school. As a teenager, he studied Islam and became a Muslim, changing his name to Kashif because it meant inventor, or discoverer.

== Career ==
=== Musician ===
In 1974, Kashif was recruited as a keyboard player and vocalist to join the funk band B. T. Express, whose credits included the hits "Express" and "Do It ('Til You're Satisfied)", among others. Seeking a more challenging musical assignment in 1978, Kashif exited B. T. Express and landed a job as a keyboardist for R&B musician Stephanie Mills.

==== 1983–1989: Solo career and nominations ====
In 1983, Kashif signed with Arista Records as a solo artist. Introduced to Arista by Milton Allen, the artist development director, his self-titled debut album Kashif (1983) spawned the hits "I Just Gotta Have You (Lover Turn Me On)", "Stone Love", "Help Yourself to My Love", "Say Something Love", and the instrumental track "The Mood". With this release, Kashif was well received as an innovator in music, as R&B artists were only beginning to experiment with synthesizers and other electronic instruments. In 1984, his second album, Send Me Your Love resulted in two Grammy nominations, "Edgartown Groove", featuring Al Jarreau, and the instrumental "Call Me Tonight" along with the hits "Baby Don't Break Your Baby's Heart" and "Are You the Woman".

His other albums include Condition of the Heart (1985), Love Changes (1987) and Kashif (1989). On the Love Changes album, Exposé provided background vocals. 1989's Kashif included the cover of the Four Tops' hit "Ain't No Woman (Like the One I've Got)". In 1989, Kashif also had a hit with the song "Personality" which was written by Nick Mundy and Gina "Go Go" Gomez. It made it to no. 6 on the Cashbox Top R&B Singles chart, holding the position for three weeks.

=== Record producer and activist ===
==== 1981: "I'm in Love" ====
In 1981 Kashif wrote and produced the hit "I'm in Love" for Evelyn "Champagne" King, which was a shift in sound from King's "Shame" to a minimalist becoming Kashif's signature sound. The song revitalized King's career and branded Kashif as one of the most sought-after producers of the day. Over the next ten years, he created hits including "So Fine" for Howard Johnson, "Love Come Down", "Betcha She Don't Love You", and "Back to Love", among many others.

==== 1983–1987 ====
Kashif's Grammy nominations are for the instrumentals "The Mood", "Call Me Tonight", "Edgartown Groove" featuring Al Jarreau.

In 1985, he received another Grammy nomination for another instrumental titled "The Movie Song". He also wrote and produced "Inside Love" for his musical idol, George Benson. It was during this time that he met and launched the career of then unknown Kenny G with "Hi How Ya Doin" and "Tribeca".

In 1985, Kashif teamed up with then newcomer Whitney Houston. The result was the hit "You Give Good Love". Kashif also produced and was her duet partner on "Thinking About You", a single track from Houston's 17-million selling (30 million until current day) debut album. The album became the bestselling debut album by a female artist. Kashif also produced "Where You Are" on Houston's second project, the result, a 15-million selling (25 million until current day) album titled Whitney.

In 1987, he produced "Love Changes", a chart topper in which Meli'sa Morgan was his duet partner and that name was taken from his bestselling album, which had the same name. The track also appears on Meli'sa Morgan's album Good Love. Also contained on that album was another duet that yielded yet another international hit, the song "Reservations For Two" with Dionne Warwick. Between 1987 and 1989, Kashif continued to churn out the hits for Jermaine Jackson, The Stylistics, Melba Moore, George Benson, Stacy Lattisaw, and many others.

==== 1996–2016 ====
In 1996, with an invitation from the UCLA Extension program, Kashif created "Contemporary Record Production with Kashif". He also wrote and self-published the book Everything You'd Better Know About the Record Industry.

In 2000, Kashif produced the theme song for the Para-Olympics, and wrote and produced "Brooklyn Breezes" for R&B singer Will Downing. He also co-produced along with George Duke the Duke Ellington Tribute CD for the Duke Ellington Foundation. On November 14, 2004, Kashif was inducted into the R&B Hall of Fame as a "Living Legend". That year Janet Jackson's hit "R&B Junkie" used a sample of "I'm in Love" written and produced by Kashif.

Kashif died at age 59 of undetermined causes in Playa del Rey, California on September 25, 2016.

== Discography ==
=== Studio albums ===
Year	Album	Chart positions		Record label
Year	Album	US	US R&B	Record label
1983	Kashif	54	10	Arista
1984	Send Me Your Love	51	4	Arista
1985	Condition of the Heart	144	32	Arista
1987	Love Changes	118	17	Arista
1989	Kashif	—	29	Arista
1998	Who Loves You?	—	—	Expansion
2004	Music from My Mind	—	—	Brooklyn Boy
"—" denotes the album failed to chart

=== Compilation albums ===
Year	Album	Record label
1992	The Best of Kashif	Arista/BMG
1998	The Definitive Collection	Arista
2002	The Best of Kashif	BMG

=== Singles ===
Year	Single	Chart positions					Album
Year	Single	US	US R&B	US Dance	US A/C	UK	Album
1983	"I Just Gotta Have You (Lover Turn Me On)"	103	5	28	—	79	Kashif (1983 album)
1983	"Stone Love"	—	22	—	—	—	Kashif (1983 album)
1983	"Help Yourself to My Love"	—	28	—	—	—	Kashif (1983 album)
1983	"Say Something Love"	—	—	—	—	—	Kashif (1983 album)
1984	"Baby Don't Break Your Baby's Heart"	108	6	40	—	—	Send Me Your Love
1984	"Are You the Woman"	—	25	—	—	—	Send Me Your Love
1984	"Ooh Love"	—	75	—	—	—	Send Me Your Love
1985	"Love on the Rise" (with Kenny G)	—	24	—	—	87	Gravity
1985	"Condition of the Heart"	—	34	—	—	—	Condition of the Heart
1986	"Dancing in the Dark (Heart to Heart)"	—	36	—	—	—	Condition of the Heart
1986	"Love the One I'm With (A Lot of Love)" (with Melba Moore)	—	5	—	—	—	A Lot of Love
1987	"Reservations for Two" (with Dionne Warwick)	62	20	—	7	—	Love Changes
1987	"Love Changes" (with Meli'sa Morgan)	—	2 (1w)	—	—	—	Love Changes
1988	"Love Me All Over"	—	14	—	—	—	Love Changes
1988	"Loving You Only"	—	60	—	—	—	Love Changes
1988	"I'm in Love" (with Melba Moore)	—	13	—	—	—	I'm in Love
1989	"Personality"	—	6	—	—	—	Kashif (1989 album)
1990	"Ain't No Woman (Like the One I've Got)"	—	33	—	—	—	Kashif (1989 album)
"—" denotes the single failed to chart

== Awards and nominations ==
=== Grammy Awards ===
Year	Nominated work	Award	Result
1984	"The Mood"	Best R&B Instrumental Performance	Nominated
1985	"Edgartown Groove"	Best R&B Performance by a Duo Or Group With Vocal	Nominated
1986	"Movie Song"	Best R&B Instrumental Performance (Orchestra, Group Or Soloist)	Nominated

=== R&B Hall of Fame ===
Year	Nominated work	Award	Result
2004	Himself	Hall of Fame	Inducted
