= Bashiri Johnson =

American percussionist (born 1955)

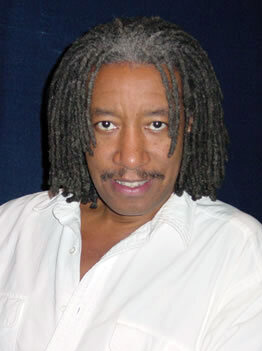

Background information
- Born: May 12, 1955 (age 71); Brooklyn, New York, U.S.
- Genres: World; soul; pop; jazz; R&B; rock
- Occupations: Percussionist; songwriter; producer; programmer; composer; vocalist; educator
- Instrument: Percussion
- Years active: 1971–present
- Labels: Life in Rhythm Media; BBE Music
- Website: bashirijohnson.com

Bashiri Johnson (born May 12, 1955) is an American percussionist, whose work has appeared on many records, as well as in commercials, films, television, video games, and concert performances. He is known to be one of the most recorded percussionists in the music business, as well as one of the most visible. While he has recorded with such artists as Luther Vandross, Miles Davis, and Patti LaBelle, he has also been a part of numerous on-stage performances; he has performed on stage with artists such as Sting, Michael Jackson, Whitney Houston, Lionel Richie, Aretha Franklin, and Steve Winwood.

== Career ==
Johnson's interest in music and percussion started at a very young age, when growing up in Bedford Stuyvesant, Brooklyn, during the 1960s. According to his mother, his talents in percussion started as early as pre-school with drumming on desks and furniture, occasionally to the extent of disrupting class.

Growing up in the 1960s and '70s, he pulled musical influence from a number of popular movements, musicians and percussionists of the time. Those include Sly Stone, Jimi Hendrix, Cream, The Panthers, and artists such as Airto, Big Black, Tito Puente, Ralph MacDonald, Bill Summers, Paulinho DaCosta, Miles Davis, James Brown and Bootsy were also strong influences on the young Bashiri Johnson.

Formal percussion education took a number of forms for Johnson, including high-school bands, lessons at Jazzmobile, lessons at the Dance Theater of Harlem, and with Olatunji. A three-year mentorship with Mtume also served as a hallmark of his early education and career. The time spent with Mtume during the 1970s taught Johnson not only the art of percussion, but the world of the music business and session recording. It led to his first professional session on "Watcha Gonna Do With My Lovin'" by Stephanie Mills, which went gold.

Johnson's career grew rapidly in the 1970s and 80s, and he was able to contribute to other gold records by artists such as Luther Vandross, and Madonna. Since then, Johnson has been recorded on hundreds of records, worked with some of the most well-known artists, and performed for some major political figures. Notably, he performed in Whitney Houston's band for 20 years, was a percussionist for Michael Jackson in the "This Is It" band. He has performed for Nelson Mandela in South Africa, as well as at the 2013 Presidential Inauguration. Johnson has also performed at the White House as part of two separate "In Performance at the White House" presentations, once for the presentation of the Gershwin Prize for Popular Song, and once for "The Motown Sound".

His most recent endeavors include participating in Michael Jackson The Immortal World Tour with Cirque du Soleil, while continuing to write, produce, and perform in a variety of media. Among his endeavors and accomplishments are a production company (Bashman Productions), record/media label (Life in Rhythm Media), and recording studio (The Lab-Brooklyn). Through The Lab-Brooklyn, Johnson has recorded his percussion for a number of notable artists, including Herbie Hancock, Barbra Streisand, George Benson, Al Jarreau, and many others. Bashiri Johnson also presents percussion intensive seminars, as well as lectures, workshops and master classes to share his knowledge and give back to young people.

== Discography ==
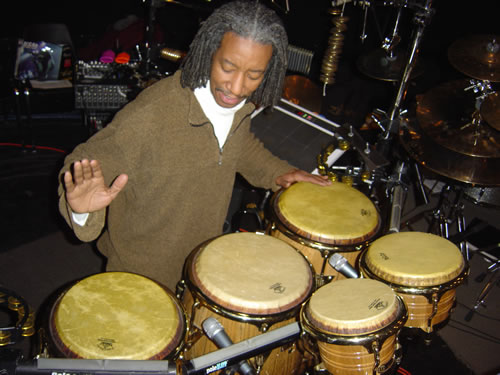
Johnson performing

- Art 'n' Rhythm (BBE Music, 2007)
- Soul Liberation (Life in Rhythm Media, 2007)
- Musical Aesop (Life in Rhythm Media, 2009)
- Musical Alphabet (Life in Rhythm Media, 2009)
- Musical Multiplication (Life In Rhythm Media, 2010)

== Filmography ==
- This Is It
- Get Him to the Greek
- The 2012 Rock and Roll Hall of Fame Induction Ceremony
- Crazy Love
- The Hoax
- Slavery and the Making of America, "Liberty in the Air"
- Naked World: America Undercover
- Michael Jackson: 30th Anniversary Celebration
- Hitch
- Mission Impossible
- The Score
- Godzilla
- The Mask
- Last Holiday
- Sex and The City 2
- Welcome Home Heroes with Whitney Houston
- Whitney: Brunei The Royal Wedding Celebration
- Classic Whitney Live from Washington D.C.
- Sting: A Winter's Night Live from Durham Cathedral

He has appeared in the following films:

- This Is It (2009)
- Get Him to the Greek
- Whitney Houston: Concert for South Africa

== Awards ==
He has been nominated by readers of Drum! Magazine and DRUMmagazine.com for two "Drummies."

- 2010 Percussionist of the Year
- 2011 World Percussionist

In a ModernDrummer reader's poll, Bashiri Johnson was voted in 2011 as a top 5 percussionist.

== Products ==
=== Percussion Libraries ===
- "Bitz & Piecez" Volume 1 (Industrial Strength) – winner of a "Loop Masters VIP Award"
- "Bitz & Piecez" Volume 2 (Industrial Strength)
- Supreme Beats (Spectrasonics)
- Ethno Techno (Ilio)
- Up From the Curb (Kurzweil Music Systems)

=== Educational ===
The Rhythmic Construction of Dance, Pop, R&B, and Hip-Hop (2005)

=== Wellness ===
He is also behind the creation of wellness product supplements and a product and service line.

- Wholeness Well Being Formula®
- Rhythm Healing™
