= Ultimate Kenny G =

Greatest hits album by Kenny G
- Released: June 10, 2003
- Genre: Jazz
- Length: 79:48
- Label: Arista
- Producer: Kenny G; Walter Afanasieff; Peter Bunetta; Rick Chudacoff; Preston Glass; L.A. Reid

Kenny G chronology
Wishes: A Holiday Album (2002)	Ultimate Kenny G (2003)	The Romance of Kenny G (2004)

Professional ratings
Review scores
Source	Rating
Allmusic	4/5 stars

Ultimate Kenny G is the third greatest hits album by saxophonist Kenny G. It was released by Arista Records in 2003, and reached number 2 on the Contemporary Jazz and Contemporary Jazz Albums charts, and number 42 on the Billboard 200.

== Track listing ==
1. "Everlasting" - 4:16
2. "Havana" - 3:58
3. "Brazil" - 4:11
4. "What a Wonderful World" - 3:02
5. "The Look of Love" - 5:32
6. "Silhouette" - 4:30
7. "One More Time" ft. Chanté Moore - 4:01
8. "Theme from Dying Young" - 4:00
9. "Forever in Love" - 4:57
10. "We've Saved the Best for Last" ft. Smokey Robinson- 4:20
11. "Songbird" - 3:59
12. "Jasmine Flower" - 4:36
13. "The Girl from Ipanema" ft. Bebel Gilberto - 4:00
14. "By the Time This Night Is Over" ft. Peabo Bryson - 4:42
15. "The Champion's Theme" - 4:22
16. "Don't Make Me Wait for Love" ft. Lenny Williams - 4:05
17. "The Moment" - 4:41
18. "My Heart Will Go On" - 4:19
19. "The Wedding Song" - 3:21
