= List of English signature songs =

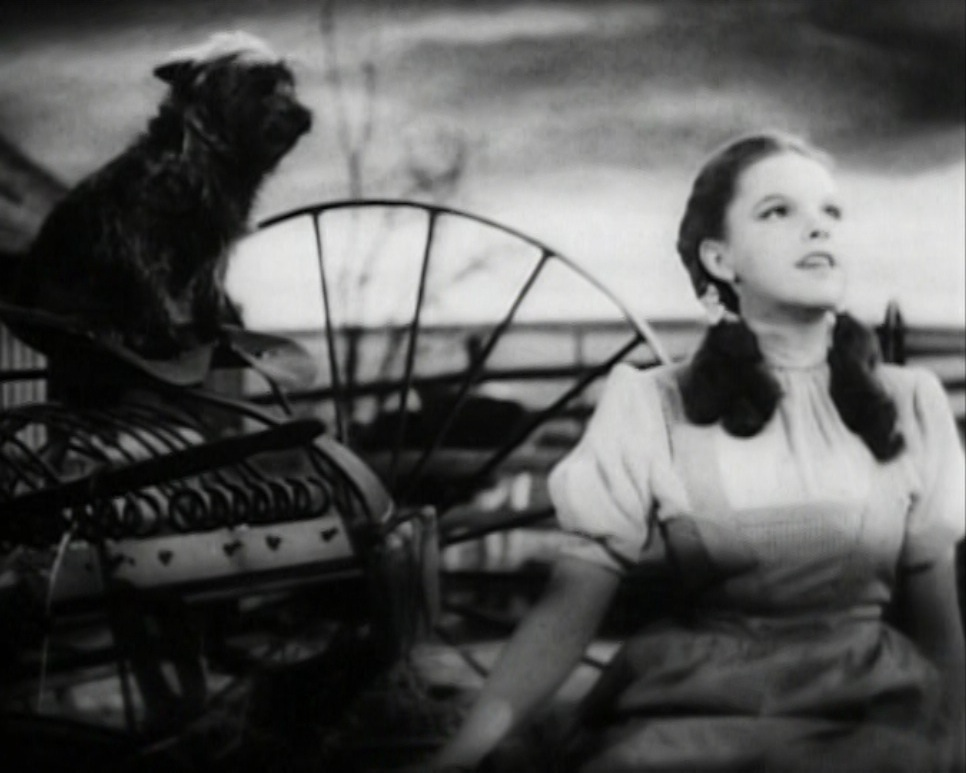
Judy Garland singing "Over the Rainbow" for the film The Wizard of Oz (1939), which became her signature song

A signature song is the one song (or, in some cases, one of a few songs) that a popular and well-established recording artist or band is most closely identified with or best known for. This is generally differentiated from a one-hit wonder in that the artist usually has had success with other songs as well.

A signature song may be a song that spearheads an artist's initial mainstream breakthrough, a song that revitalizes an artist's career, or a song that simply represents a high point in an artist's career. Often, a signature song will feature significant characteristics of an artist and may encapsulate the artist's particular sound and style. A band or group can have a signature song as a whole while an individual member may also be strongly identified with a different signature song from the same catalog; for example, Fleetwood Mac's signature song is widely considered to be "Don't Stop", but the band's song "Landslide" is regarded as member Stevie Nicks's signature song as she wrote and performed it.

Signature songs can be the result of spontaneous public identification, or a marketing tool developed by the music industry to promote artists, sell their recordings, and develop a fan base. Artists and bands with a signature song are generally expected to perform it at every concert appearance, often as an encore on concert tours, sometimes being the last song of the setlist.

== Examples by artist ==
Listed alphabetically by artist.

Song	Artist	Released	Written by / notes	Ref(s)
=== # ===
"Sex"	The 1975	2013	Matthew Healy, George Daniel, Adam Hann, and Ross MacDonald	
"Bank Account"	21 Savage	2017	Shayaa Abraham-Joseph and Leland Wayne	
"Kryptonite"	3 Doors Down	2000	Brad Arnold	
"In da Club"	50 Cent	2003	Curtis Jackson, Andre Young, and Mike Elizondo	
"She Looks So Perfect"	5 Seconds of Summer	2014	Ashton Irwin, Michael Clifford, and Jake Sinclair as the band's debut single	
"Where My Girls At?"	702	1999	Melissa Elliott, Eric Seats, and Rapture Stewart	
"The Hardest Thing"	98 Degrees	1999	Steve Kipner and David Frank	
=== A ===
"One in a Million"	Aaliyah	1996	Melissa Elliott and Tim Mosley	
"Dancing Queen"	ABBA	1976	Benny Andersson, Björn Ulvaeus, and Stig Anderson	
"Straight Up"	Paula Abdul	1988	Elliot Wolff	
"That's So True"	Gracie Abrams	2024	Abrams and Audrey Hobert	
"You Shook Me All Night Long"	AC/DC	1980	Angus Young, Malcolm Young, and Brian Johnson. AC/DC's first single with Johnson as the lead singer, replacing Bon Scott who died in February 1980.	
"The Sign"	Ace of Base	1994	Jonas Berggren	
"Summer of '69"	Bryan Adams	1985	Adams and Jim Vallance	
"Ain't in LA"	Adéla	2026	Adéla Jergová, Blake Slatkin, Dylan Brady, Billy Walsh, and Theron Thomas. The first song by a Slovak artist to chart on the U.S. Billboard Hot 100.	
"Rolling in the Deep"	Adele	2010	Adele Adkins and Paul Epworth	
"Walk This Way"	Aerosmith	1975	Steven Tyler and Joe Perry. Inducted into the Grammy Hall of Fame in 2019.	
"Beautiful"	Christina Aguilera	2002	Linda Perry	
"Take On Me"	a-ha	1984	Magne Furuholmen, Morten Harket, and Paul Waaktaar-Savoy.	
"The Worst"	Jhené Aiko	2014	Jhené Aiko Chilombo, Myron Birdsong, Mac Robinson, Brian Warfield, Shawn Carter, Chad Hugo, and Pharrell Williams. Samples "Excuse Me Miss" by Jay-Z.	
"All Out of Love"	Air Supply	1980	Clive Davis and Graham Russell	
"Locked Up"	Akon	2004	Akon as the lead single from his debut album Trouble	
"Tell Me"	Joey Albert	1983	Louie Ocampo and Allan Ayque	
"Man in the Box"	Alice in Chains	1990	Jerry Cantrell and Layne Staley	
"I Swear"	All-4-One	1994	Gary Baker	
"Dirty Little Secret"	The All-American Rejects	2005	Nick Wheeler and Tyson Ritter	
"Smile"	Lily Allen	2006	Allen, Iyiola Babalola, Darren Lewis, Jackie Mittoo, and Clement Dodd as Allen's debut single	
"Dear Maria, Count Me In"	All Time Low	2008	Jack Barakat, Rian Dawson, Alex Gaskarth, and Zack Merrick	
"Best Day of My Life"	American Authors	2013	Aaron Accetta, Zachary Barnett, Shep Goodman, David Rublin, Matthew Sanchez, and James Shelley	
"Rose Garden"	Lynn Anderson	1970	Joe South	
"Snow on the Sahara"	Anggun	1997	Erick Benzi and Nikki Matheson, the latter of whom adapted it to English from French	
"Girl from Rio"	Anitta	2021	Vinicius de Moraes, Norman Gimbel, Tom Jobim, Anitta, Mikkel Eriksen, Tor Hermansen, Raye, and Gale. Interpolates "The Girl from Ipanema" by de Moraes and Jobim. Includes Portuguese language.	
"The House of the Rising Sun"	The Animals	1964	Traditional folk song, with the lyrics arranged by Alan Price	
"Home"	Gabrielle Aplin	2013	Aplin and Nick Atkinson	
"Criminal"	Fiona Apple	1997	Apple	
"Wake Up"	Arcade Fire	2005	Will Butler, Win Butler, Régine Chassagne, Tim Kingsbury, and Richard Reed Parry	
"Crush"	David Archuleta	2008	Jess Cates, David Hodges, and Emanuel Kiriakou as Archuleta's debut single	
"Do I Wanna Know?"	Arctic Monkeys	2013	Alex Turner, Jamie Cook, Nick O'Malley, and Matt Helders. First Arctic Monkeys song to enter the Billboard Hot 100 chart in the United States.	
"What a Wonderful World"	Louis Armstrong	1967	Bob Thiele (as "George Douglas") and George David Weiss	
"The Cattle Call"	Eddy Arnold	1949	Written and recorded by Tex Owens in 1934	
"Say You Won't Let Go"	James Arthur	2016	Arthur, Andrew Frampton, Daniel O'Donoghue, Steve Kipner, Mark Sheehan, Neil Ormandy, Steve Solomon	
"Foolish"	Ashanti	2002	Ashanti Douglass, Mark DeBarge, Etterlene Jordan, Irving Lorenzo, and 7 Aurelius	
"Heat of the Moment"	Asia	1982	John Wetton and Geoff Downes	
"Never Gonna Give You Up"	Rick Astley	1987	Written and produced by Stock Aitken Waterman. Repopularized in the 2000s via the Rickrolling internet meme.	
"Upside Down"	A-Teens	2000	Gustav Jonsson, Markus Sepehrmanesh, and Tommy Tysper. The band's first original release.	
"Runaway"	Aurora	2015	Aurora Aksnes and Magnus Skylstad as the lead single from Aurora's debut extended play, Running with the Wolves	
"Back in the Saddle Again"	Gene Autry	1939	Autry	
"Bat Country"	Avenged Sevenfold	2005	Avenged Sevenfold	
"Wake Me Up"	Avicii	2013	Written and produced by Tim Bergling. Vocals provided by Aloe Blacc.	
"Sail"	Awolnation	2010	Aaron Bruno	
"Fancy"	Iggy Azalea	2014	Amethyst Kelly, Charlotte Aitchison, George Astasio, Jason Pebworth, Jonathan Christopher Shave, and Kurtis McKenzie. Azalea's and Charli XCX's (Aitchison's) first number-one on the Billboard Hot 100.	
=== B ===
"Love Shack"	The B-52s	1989	The B-52s	
"Nothin' on You"	B.o.B	2009	Bobby Simmons Jr., Bruno Mars, Philip Lawrence, and Ari Levine, and produced by the Smeezingtons as the lead single from B.o.B's debut studio album, B.o.B Presents: The Adventures of Bobby Ray (2010)	
"From Me to U"	Babymetal	2025	Moriah Rose Pereira, Jordan Fish, and Mk-metal. Includes Japanese language.	
"Batter Up"	Babymonster	2023	Chaz Mishan, Yang Hyun-suk, Dee.P, Jared Lee, Asa, Choi Hyun-suk, Lee Chan-hyuk, Where the Noise, and BigTone. Includes Korean language.	
"I Want It That Way"	Backstreet Boys	1999	Max Martin and Andreas Carlsson	
"Tyrone"	Erykah Badu	1997	Badu and Norman "Keys" Hurt	
"Shooting Stars"	Bag Raiders	2009	Bag Raiders	
"Paloma Blanca"	George Baker Selection	1975	Johannes Bouwens	
"Rejoice"	Julien Baker	2015	Baker	
"Hallelujah"	Bamboo	2005	Nathan Azarcon, Bamboo Mañalac, Ira Cruz, and Vic Mercado. Includes Tagalog language.	
"Manic Monday"	The Bangles	1985	Prince (as Christopher)	
"212"	Azealia Banks	2011	Banks and Jef Martens as Banks's debut single	
"Love Song"	Sara Bareilles	2007	Bareilles as her debut single	
"One Week"	Barenaked Ladies	1998	Ed Robertson	
"Working Class Man"	Jimmy Barnes	1985	Jonathan Cain	
"One O'Clock Jump"	Count Basie	1937	A 12-bar blues instrumental Basie	
"Goldfinger"	Shirley Bassey	1964	John Barry, Leslie Bricusse, and Anthony Newley for the James Bond film of the same name	
"Pompeii"	Bastille	2013	Dan Smith	
"Bela Lugosi's Dead"	Bauhaus	1979	David J, Kevin Haskins, Peter Murphy, and Daniel Ash. Considered the harbinger of gothic rock music.	
"Mine"	Bazzi	2017	Bazzi. Began charting in 2018 after becoming an internet meme.	
"The Way You Look at Me"	Christian Bautista	2004	Andrew Fromm and Keith Follesé as Bautista's debut single	
"Glue Song"	Beabadoobee	2023	Beatrice Laus	
"California Girls"	The Beach Boys	1965	Brian Wilson and Mike Love. Inducted into the Grammy Hall of Fame in 2010.	
"Sabotage"	Beastie Boys	1994	Michael Diamond, Adam Horovitz, and Adam Yauch	
"Loser"	Beck	1993	Beck and Carl Stephenson	
"Gotta Get Thru This"	Daniel Bedingfield	2001	Bedingfield as the lead single from his debut studio album of the same name (2002)	
"Unwritten"	Natasha Bedingfield	2004	Bedingfield, Danielle Brisebois, and Wayne Rodrigues	
"Stayin' Alive"	Bee Gees	1977	Barry Gibb, Robin Gibb, and Maurice Gibb	
"Selfish"	Madison Beer	2020	Beer, Elizabeth Lowell Boland, Jaramye Daniels, Jeremy Dussolliet, Leroy Clampitt, and Tim Sommers	
"Poison"	Bel Biv DeVoe	1990	Dr. Freeze	
"Hit Me with Your Best Shot"	Pat Benatar	1980	Eddie Schwartz	
"I Left My Heart in San Francisco"	Tony Bennett	1962	George Cory and Douglass Cross	
"Johnny B. Goode"	Chuck Berry	1958	Berry	
"Single Ladies (Put a Ring on It)"	Beyoncé	2008	Beyoncé Knowles, Christopher Stewart, and Terius "The-Dream" Nash	
"Baby"	Justin Bieber	2010	Bieber, Christopher "Tricky" Stewart, Terius Nash, Christopher Bridges, and Christina Milian	
"Worldwide"	Big Time Rush	2011	Eddie Serrano, Chris Rojas, and Emily Phillips	
"Rebel Girl"	Bikini Kill	1993	Kathleen Hanna, Billy Karren, Tobi Vail, and Kathi Wilcox	
"Pantropiko"	Bini	2023	Mat Olavides, Jumbo De Belen, Angelika Ortiz, and Pow Chavez. Includes Tagalog language.	
"Skinny Love"	Birdy	2011	Originally Justin Vernon for his band Bon Iver's debut album For Emma, Forever Ago (2008) with Birdy covering the song in 2011 as her debut single from her eponymous debut album	
"Just a Friend"	Biz Markie	1989	Marcel Hall, Kenneth Gamble, and Leon Huff	
"Hyperballad"	Björk	1996	Björk	
"I Gotta Feeling"	Black Eyed Peas	2009	William Adams, Stacy Ferguson, Jaime Gomez, David Guetta, Allan Pineda, and Frédéric Riesterer	
"Kill This Love"	Blackpink	2019	Teddy and Bekuh Boom. Includes Korean language.	
"No Diggity"	Blackstreet	1996	Teddy Riley, Andre Young, Lynise Walters, William Stewart, Bill Withers, Richard Vick, and Chauncey Hannibal	
"Paranoid"	Black Sabbath	1970	Geezer Butler, Tony Iommi, Ozzy Osbourne, and Bill Ward. Black Sabbath's first song to chart on the U.S. Billboard Hot 100.	
"Your Universe"	Rico Blanco	2008	Blanco	
"I Wanna Get Better"	Bleachers	2014	Jack Antonoff and John Hill as Bleachers' debut single	
"Real Love"	Mary J. Blige	1992	Cory Rooney and Mark Morales	
"All the Small Things"	Blink-182	1999	Tom DeLonge and Mark Hoppus	
"Heart of Glass"	Blondie	1979	Debbie Harry and Chris Stein	
"(Don't Fear) The Reaper"	Blue Öyster Cult	1976	Written and sung by Donald "Buck Dharma" Roeser	
"You're Beautiful"	James Blunt	2005	Blunt, Sacha Skarbek, and Amanda Ghost	
"Only One"	BoA	2012	BoA. Includes Korean language.	
"Tha Crossroads"	Bone Thugs-n-Harmony	1996	Bone, Tim Middleton, and Tony C	
"Rasputin"	Boney M.	1978	Frank Farian, George Reyam, and Fred Jay	
"Holocene"	Bon Iver	2011	Justin Vernon	
"Livin' on a Prayer"	Bon Jovi	1986	Jon Bon Jovi, Richie Sambora and Desmond Child	
"I Don't Like Mondays"	The Boomtown Rats	1979	Bob Geldof and Johnnie Fingers	
"Beautiful Things"	Benson Boone	2024	Boone, Jack LaFrantz, and Evan Blair	
"Space Oddity"	David Bowie	1969	Bowie	
"I Dreamed a Dream"	Susan Boyle	2010	Originally composed by Claude-Michel Schönberg with English lyrics by Herbert Kretzmer for the musical Les Misérables	
"End of the Road"	Boyz II Men	1992	Kenneth "Babyface" Edmonds, Antonio "L.A." Reid, and Daryl Simmons	
"All That I Need"	Boyzone	1998	Carl Sturken and Evan Rogers	
"Everywhere"	Michelle Branch	2001	Branch, John Shanks, Matt Bronleewe, and Tiffany Arbuckle Lee	
"Gloria"	Laura Branigan	1982	Originally written in Italian by Umberto Tozzi, Giancarlo Bigazzi, and Jonathan King for Tozzi's 1979 single, with Branigan covering the song in English for her 1982 debut album	
"Un-Break My Heart"	Toni Braxton	1996	Diane Warren	
"The Diary of Jane"	Breaking Benjamin	2006	Benjamin Burnley, Aaron Fink, and Mark Klepaski	
"Kyoto"	Phoebe Bridgers	2020	Bridgers, Morgan Nagler, and Marshall Vore	
"My Prerogative"	Bobby Brown	1988	Bobby Brown, Teddy Riley, Gene Griffin, Aaron Hall, and Timmy Gatling	
"Run It!"	Chris Brown	2005	Scott Storch, Sean Garrett, and LaRon James	
"Haven't Met You Yet"	Michael Bublé	2009	Bublé, Alan Chang, and Amy Foster-Gilles	
"Hallelujah"	Jeff Buckley	1994	Originally written and recorded by Leonard Cohen in 1984	
"Margaritaville"	Jimmy Buffett	1977	Buffett and recorded in 1976 at Criteria Studios and Quadrafonic Sound Studios	
"Running Up That Hill"	Kate Bush	1985	Bush. Repopularized in 2022 following its usage in the fourth season of the Netflix television series Stranger Things.	
"The Touch"	Stan Bush	1986	Bush. Originally written for the 1986 film Cobra; made famous for its use in The Transformers: The Movie, released in the same year	
=== C ===
"Havana"	Camila Cabello	2017	Cabello, Jeffery Williams, Brittany Hazzard, Pharrell Williams, Adam Feeney, Brian Lee, Ali Tamposi, Andrew Watt, Louis Bell, and Kaan Güneşberk as the lead single from Cabello's debut solo studio album Camila (2018)	
"Get You"	Daniel Caesar	2016	Caesar and Kali Uchis as the lead single from Caesar's debut studio album Freudian (2017)	
"Bubbly"	Colbie Caillat	2007	Caillat and Jason Reeves	
"Rhinestone Cowboy"	Glen Campbell	1975	Originally written and recorded by Larry Weiss in 1974	
"Can We Talk"	Tevin Campbell	1993	Babyface and Daryl Simmons	
"Someone You Loved"	Lewis Capaldi	2018	Capaldi, Samuel Romans, Thomas Barnes, Peter Kelleher, and Benjamin Kohn	
"Scars to Your Beautiful"	Alessia Cara	2016	Alessia Caracciollo, Warren Felder, Coleridge Tillman, Andrew Wansel, and Justin Franks	
"Bodak Yellow"	Cardi B	2017	Belcalis Almánzar, Dieuson Octave, Klenord Raphael, Jorden Thorpe, Anthony White, and Laquan Green	
"Hero"	Mariah Carey	1993	Carey and Walter Afanasieff	
"The Story"	Brandi Carlile	2007	Phil Hanseroth	
"Heaven Is a Place on Earth"	Belinda Carlisle	1987	Rick Nowels and Ellen Shipley	
"A Thousand Miles"	Vanessa Carlton	2002	Carlton	
"All by Myself"	Eric Carmen	1975	Carmen	
"Lovefool"	The Cardigans	1996	Nina Persson and Peter Svensson as the lead single from their third studio album First Band on the Moon	
"Bette Davis Eyes"	Kim Carnes	1981	Donna Weiss and Jackie DeShannon	
"Espresso"	Sabrina Carpenter	2024	Carpenter, Julian Bunetta, Amy Allen, and Steph Jones	
"(They Long to Be) Close to You"	The Carpenters	1970	Burt Bacharach and Hal David	
"Just What I Needed"	The Cars	1978	Ric Ocasek	
"Folsom Prison Blues"	Johnny Cash	1955	Cash in 1953	
"The Mercy Seat"	Nick Cave and the Bad Seeds	1988	Cave and Mick Harvey	
"Strange"	Celeste	2019	Celeste Waite, Stephen Wrabel, and Jamie Hartman as the lead single from Celeste's debut studio album Not Your Muse (2021)	
"Closer"	The Chainsmokers	2016	Andrew Taggart, Ashley Frangipane, Shaun Frank, Frederic Kennett, Isaac Slade, and Joe King. The Chainsmokers' first number one single on the Billboard Hot 100.	
"Christmas in Our Hearts"	Jose Mari Chan	1990	Chan and Rina Cañiza. Due to the song's recurring popularity during the annual holiday season, Chan became known to Filipinos as "The Father of Philippine Christmas Music".	
"Sunday Candy"	Chance the Rapper	2015	Chancelor Bennett, Eryn Allen Kane, Franco Davis, J. Red, Jamila Woods, J.P. Floyd, Macie Stewart, Nate Fox, Nico Segal, Patrick Paige, Peter Cottontale, Sima Cunningham, and Stix	
"Fast Car"	Tracy Chapman	1988	Chapman	
"What'd I Say"	Ray Charles	1959	Charles	
"Track 10"	Charli XCX	2017	Charlotte Aitchison, A. G. Cook, Mikkel S. Eriksen, Tor E. Hermansen, Jonnali Parmenius, and Alexandra Yatchenko. Reworked into "Blame It on Your Love" in 2019.	
"I Want You to Want Me"	Cheap Trick	1977	Rick Nielsen and produced by Tom Werman	
"The Twist"	Chubby Checker	1960	Written and recorded by Hank Ballard in 1958	
"If I Could Turn Back Time"	Cher	1989	Diane Warren	
"Thank Heaven for Little Girls"	Maurice Chevalier	1957	Alan Jay Lerner and Frederick Loewe for the 1958 film Gigi	
"25 or 6 to 4"	Chicago	1970	Robert Lamm	
"Under the Milky Way"	The Church	1988	Steve Kilbey and Karin Jansson of Curious (Yellow)	
"The Mother We Share"	Chvrches	2012	Iain Cook, Martin Doherty, and Lauren Mayberry	
"Goodies"	Ciara	2004	Ciara, Jonathan Smith, LaMarqius Jefferson, Craig Love, and Sean Garrett	
"Apocalypse"	Cigarettes After Sex	2017	Written and produced by Greg Gonzalez. It did not chart internationally until 2022, following its use in TikTok trends.	
"Pretty Girl"	Clairo	2017	Written and produced by Clairo	
"Layla"	Eric Clapton	1970	Clapton and Jim Gordon	
"Downtown"	Petula Clark	1964	Tony Hatch	
"Since U Been Gone"	Kelly Clarkson	2004	Max Martin and Lukasz Gottwald	
"London Calling"	The Clash	1979	Joe Strummer and Mick Jones	
"Crazy"	Patsy Cline	1961	Willie Nelson	
"Walking in Memphis"	Marc Cohn	1991	Cohn	
"Khe Sanh"	Cold Chisel	1978	Don Walker as their debut single	
"Clocks"	Coldplay	2002	Guy Berryman, Jonny Buckland, Will Champion, and Chris Martin	
"In the Air Tonight"	Phil Collins	1981	Collins as his debut solo single	
"I Wanna Sex You Up"	Color Me Badd	1991	Elliot Straite and Color Me Badd	
"My Favorite Things"	John Coltrane	1961	Published in 1959 by Rodgers and Hammerstein for the musical The Sound of Music	
"Gangsta's Paradise"	Coolio	1995	Artis Ivey Jr., Larry Sanders, Doug Rasheed, and Stevie Wonder	
"School's Out"	Alice Cooper	1972	Cooper, Michael Bruce, Glen Buxton, Dennis Dunaway, and Neal Smith	
"The Rhythm of the Night"	Corona	1993	Francesco Bontempi, Annerley Emma Gordon, Giorgio Spagna, Pete Glenister, and Michael Gaffey as the title track of the group's debut studio album of the same name (1995)	
"A Million Thanks to You"	Pilita Corrales	1963	Written and originally recorded by Alice Doria-Gamilla in 1960	
"Breathless"	The Corrs	2000	the Corrs and R.J. Lange	
"Mr. Jones"	Counting Crows	1993	David Bryson and Adam Duritz	
"Zombie"	The Cranberries	1994	Dolores O'Riordan	
"Bright Lights"	Billy Crawford	2004	Phillip L. Stewart II and Terius Nash	
"With Arms Wide Open"	Creed	2000	Scott Stapp and Mark Tremonti	
"Proud Mary"	Creedence Clearwater Revival	1969	John Fogerty	
"Sailing"	Christopher Cross	1980	Cross	
"All I Wanna Do"	Sheryl Crow	1994	Crow, Kevin Gilbert, Bill Bottrell, Wyn Cooper, and David Baerwald	
"Karma Chameleon"	Culture Club	1983	Boy George, Jon Moss, Mikey Craig, Roy Hay, and Phil Pickett	
"Mr. DJ"	Sharon Cuneta	1978	Rey Valera. Includes Filipino language.	
"Just Like Heaven"	The Cure	1987	Robert Smith, Simon Gallup, Porl Thompson, Boris Williams, and Lol Tolhurst	
"Achy Breaky Heart"	Billy Ray Cyrus	1992	Don Von Tress in 1990	
"Wrecking Ball"	Miley Cyrus	2013	Maureen McDonald, Stephan Moccio, Sacha Skarbek, David Kim, Lukasz Gottwald, and Henry Walter	
=== D ===
"Suge"	DaBaby	2019	Johnathan Kirk, TahjMorgan, and Darryl Clemons	
"Night Shift"	Lucy Dacus	2017	Dacus	
"One More Time"	Daft Punk	2000	Thomas Bangalter, Guy-Manuel de Homem-Christo, Anthony Moore, and Eddie Johns	
"Beyond the Sea"	Bobby Darin	1959	Charles Trenet	
"Hands Down"	Dashboard Confessional	2003	Chris Carrabba in 2001	
"It's Not Over"	Daughtry	2006	Chris Daughtry, Gregg Wattenberg, Mark Wilkerson, and Ace Young	
"I've Gotta Be Me"	Sammy Davis Jr.	1968	Walter Marks	
"Que Sera, Sera (Whatever Will Be, Will Be)"	Doris Day	1956	Jay Livingston and Ray Evans	
"Sit Still, Look Pretty"	Daya	2015	Gino Barletta, Mike Campbell, and Britten Newbill	
"Holiday in Cambodia"	Dead Kennedys	1980	Jello Biafra and John Greenway. Recorded in 1979.	
"Man I Need"	Olivia Dean	2025	Dean, Tobias Jesso Jr., and Zach Nahome. Dean's first number-one hit single in the United Kingdom and the United States.	
"Smoke on the Water"	Deep Purple	1972	Ritchie Blackmore, Ian Gillan, Roger Glover, Jon Lord, and Ian Paice. Recorded in December 1971.	
"Pour Some Sugar on Me"	Def Leppard	1987	Joe Elliott, Robert John "Mutt" Lange, Phil Collen, Steve Clark, and Rick Savage	
"Video Games"	Lana Del Rey	2011	Elizabeth Grant and Justin Parker	
"Take Me Home, Country Roads"	John Denver	1971	Denver, Bill Danoff, and Taffy Nivert	
"Want to Want Me"	Jason Derulo	2015	Jason Desrouleaux, Ian Kirkpatrick, Samuel Denison Martin, Lindy Robbins, and Mitch Allan	
"Survivor"	Destiny's Child	2001	Beyoncé Knowles, Anthony Dent, and Mathew Knowles	
"Come On Eileen"	Dexy's Midnight Runners	1982	Kevin Rowland, Jim Paterson, and Billy Adams	
"Hollywood"	Marina Diamandis	2010	Diamandis under the stage name Marina and the Diamonds	
"Sweet Caroline"	Neil Diamond	1969	Diamond	
"Meet in the Middle"	Diamond Rio	1991	Chapin Hartford, Jim Foster, and Don Pfrimmer	
"Falling In Love Again"	Marlene Dietrich	1930	Composed by Friedrich Hollaender. Includes German language.	
"My Heart Will Go On"	Celine Dion	1997	James Horner (music) and Will Jennings (lyrics) for the film Titanic (1997)	
"Sultans of Swing"	Dire Straits	1978	Mark Knopfler	
"Down with the Sickness"	Disturbed	2000	Disturbed	
"End of Beginning"	Djo	2022	Joe Keery	
"X Gon' Give It to Ya"	DMX	2002	Earl Simmons, Shatek King, and Kasseem Dean	
"Anxiety"	Doechii	2025	Jaylah Hickmon, Wally De Backer, and Luiz Bonfá. Originally released on YouTube in 2019. Samples "Somebody That I Used to Know" by Gotye featuring Kimbra.	
"Say So"	Doja Cat	2019	Amala Dlamini, Lukasz Gottwald, Lydia Asrat, and David Sprecher. A remix with Nicki Minaj was later released in 2020.	
"Light My Fire"	The Doors	1967	Jim Morrison, Robby Krieger, John Densmore, and Ray Manzarek. Recorded in August 1966.	
"Through the Fire and Flames"	DragonForce	2006	Sam Totman and ZP Theart as the opening track from the band's third studio album Inhuman Rampage	
"Hotline Bling"	Drake	2015	Aubrey Graham, Paul Jefferies, and Timmy Thomas	
"Nuthin' but a 'G' Thang"	Dr. Dre	1993	Snoop Doggy Dogg and produced by Dr. Dre	
"Pull Me Under"	Dream Theater	1991	James LaBrie, Kevin Moore, John Myung, John Petrucci and Mike Portnoy.	
"Bodies"	Drowning Pool	2001	Stevie Benton, Mike Luce, C.J. Pierce, and Dave Williams	
"What Dreams Are Made Of"	Hilary Duff	2003	Dean Pitchford and Matthew Wilder for The Lizzie McGuire Movie (2003)	
"Rio"	Duran Duran	1982	Simon Le Bon, John Taylor, Roger Taylor, Andy Taylor, and Nick Rhodes	
"Like a Rolling Stone"	Bob Dylan	1965	Dylan. Rolling Stone magazine listed it at No. 1 on their 2004 and 2010 "500 Greatest Songs of All Time" lists.	
=== E ===
"Hotel California"	Eagles	1977	Don Felder, Don Henley, and Glenn Frey	
"September"	Earth, Wind & Fire	1978	Allee Willis and Maurice White	
"Cool Kids"	Echosmith	2013	Jeffery David, Jesiah Dzwonek, Sydney Sierota, Noah Sierota, Graham Sierota, and Jamie Sierota as Echosmith's debut single	
"Bad Guy"	Billie Eilish	2019	Billie Eilish and Finneas O'Connell	
"One Day Like This"	Elbow	2008	Guy Garvey	
"Mr. Blue Sky"	Electric Light Orchestra	1978	Jeff Lynne	
"Boo'd Up"	Ella Mai	2018	Joelle James, Ella Howell, Dijon McFarlane, and Larrance Dopson	
"Take the 'A' Train"	Duke Ellington	1941	A jazz standard composed by Billy Strayhorn in 1939	
"Dream a Little Dream of Me"	Cass Elliot	1968	Fabian Andre, Wilbur Schwandt (both for the music), and Gus Kahn (lyrics) in 1930. Elliot's band, The Mamas & the Papas, covered the song for their fourth studio album, The Papas & the Mamas (1968).	
"Murder on the Dancefloor"	Sophie Ellis-Bextor	2001	Ellis-Bextor and Gregg Alexander. Ellis-Bextor's first entry on the Billboard Global 200.	
"Stay with Me"	Lorraine Ellison	1966	Jerry Ragovoy and George David Weiss	
"Lose Yourself"	Eminem	2002	Marshall Mathers for the film 8 Mile (2002). It became the first hip hop song to win the Academy Award for Best Original Song.	
"Walking on a Dream"	Empire of the Sun	2008	Luke Steele, Nick Littlemore, and Donnie Sloan	
"Bite Me"	Enhypen	2023	Cirkut, David Stewart, Jason Evigan, Lourdiz, and Supreme Boi. Includes Korean language.	
"Don't Let Go (Love)"	En Vogue	1996	Andrea Martin, Ivan Matias, Marqueze Ethridge, and Organized Noize	
"Only Time"	Enya	2000	Enya and Roma Ryan	
"American Boy"	Estelle	2008	William Adams, Estelle Swaray, John Stephens, Kanye West, Ethan Hendrickson, Josh Lopez, Caleb Speir, and Keith Harris	
"The Final Countdown"	Europe	1986	Joey Tempest	
"Sweet Dreams (Are Made of This)"	Eurythmics	1983	Annie Lennox and Dave Stewart	
"Bring Me to Life"	Evanescence	2003	Amy Lee, Ben Moody, and David Hodges	
"Waltz for Debby"	Bill Evans	1956	Composed by Evans for the New Jazz Conceptions album	
"More Than Words"	Extreme	1991	Gary Cherone and Nuno Bettencourt	
=== F ===
"Epic"	Faith No More	1990	Mike Patton, Billy Gould, Jim Martin, Roddy Bottum, and Mike Bordin	
"Sugar, We're Goin Down"	Fall Out Boy	2005	Pete Wentz, Patrick Stump, Joe Trohman, and Andy Hurley	
"You're the Voice"	John Farnham	1986	Chris Thompson, Maggie Ryder, Andy Qunta, and Keith Reid	
"Praise You"	Fatboy Slim	1999	Norman Cook and Camille Yarbrough	
"Blueberry Hill"	Fats Domino	1956	Composed by Vincent Rose and Larry Stock and Al Lewis. Inducted into the National Recording Registry as a part of the 2005 class.	
"Big Girls Don't Cry"	Fergie	2007	Stacy Ferguson and Toby Gad	
"Don't Say Goodbye"	Pops Fernandez	1988	Louie Ocampo and Fernandez's then-husband Martin Nievera	
"Trap Queen"	Fetty Wap	2014	Willie Maxwell and Anton Matsulevich	
"Work from Home"	Fifth Harmony	2016	Daniel Bedingfield, Joshua Coleman, Dallas Koehlke, Jude Demorest, Tyrone Griffin Jr., Alexander Izquierdo, Brian Lee, and Larry Wells Jr.	
"She Drives Me Crazy"	Fine Young Cannibals	1988	Roland Gift and David Steele	
"Paralyzer"	Finger Eleven	2007	Finger Eleven	
"Suckerpunch"	Five Iron Frenzy	2021	Reese Roper	
"Two Weeks"	FKA Twigs	2014	FKA Twigs and Emile Haynie	
"White Winter Hymnal"	Fleet Foxes	2008	Robin Pecknold	
"Don't Stop"	Fleetwood Mac	1977	Christine McVie	
"Heavy"	Florence Road	2025	Lily Aron, Hannah Kelly, Ailbhe Barry, Emma Brandon, John Hill, and Marshall Vore	
"Everlong"	Foo Fighters	1997	Dave Grohl	
"I Want to Know What Love Is"	Foreigner	1984	Mick Jones	
"Pretty Vegas"	J.D. Fortune	2005	Andrew Farriss, Fortune, Marty Casey, and Jordis Unga for band INXS. INXS's first single with Fortune as their lead singer.	
"Pumped Up Kicks"	Foster the People	2010	Mark Foster	
"Respect"	Aretha Franklin	1967	Otis Redding in 1965	
"Take Me Out"	Franz Ferdinand	2004	Alex Kapranos and Nick McCarthy	
"How to Save a Life"	The Fray	2006	Isaac Slade and Joe King	
"Killing Me Softly With His Song"	The Fugees	1996	Charles Fox, Norman Gimbel, and Lori Lieberman	
"We Are Young"	Fun	2011	Jack Antonoff, Jeff Bhasker, Andrew Dost, and Nathaniel Ruess. Featured Janelle Monáe.	
"I'm Like a Bird"	Nelly Furtado	2000	Furtado	
=== G ===
"Solsbury Hill"	Peter Gabriel	1977	Gabriel	
"This Is America"	Childish Gambino	2018	Donald Glover, Ludwig Göransson, and Jeffery Lamar Williams	
"Bridge over Troubled Water"	Art Garfunkel	1970	Paul Simon for Simon & Garfunkel. Recorded in 1969.	
"Over the Rainbow"	Judy Garland	1939	Composed by Harold Arlen and E.Y. Harburg for the film The Wizard of Oz	
"I Heard It Through the Grapevine"	Marvin Gaye	1968	Norman Whitfield and Barrett Strong. Gaye's version of the song was the second to be recorded, in 1967, but the third to be released.	
"I Will Survive"	Gloria Gaynor	1978	Freddie Perren and Dino Fekaris	
"To Love You More"	Sarah Geronimo	2003	David Foster and Edgar Bronfman Jr. for Celine Dion in 1995 with Geronimo covering the song for her winning performance on the reality competition show Star for a Night (2003), which was later included on her debut studio album Popstar: A Dream Come True released later that year	
"Kick It in the Sticks"	Brantley Gilbert	2010	Gilbert, Rhett Akins and Ben Hayslip	
"Heat Waves"	Glass Animals	2020	Dave Bayley	
"F.N.F. (Let's Go)"	GloRilla	2022	Anthony Holmes Jr. and Gloria Woods as GloRilla's debut single	
"Crazy"	Gnarls Barkley	2006	Brian Burton, Thomas Callaway, Gian Franco Reverberi, and Gian Piero Reverberi as Gnarls Barkley's (Burton and Callaway's) debut single	
"We Got the Beat"	The Go-Go's	1980	Charlotte Caffey	
"Bad Liar"	Selena Gomez	2017	Gomez, Justin Tranter, Julia Michaels, Ian Kirkpatrick, David Byrne, Chris Frantz, and Tina Weymouth. Interpolates the bassline from "Psycho Killer" by Talking Heads.	
"The Anthem"	Good Charlotte	2003	Benji Madden, Joel Madden, and John Feldmann	
"Born to Try"	Delta Goodrem	2002	Goodrem and Audius Mtawarira	
"Iris"	Goo Goo Dolls	1998	John Rzeznik	
"You Don't Own Me"	Lesley Gore	1963	John Madara and Dave White	
"Feel Good Inc."	Gorillaz	2005	Gorillaz and David Jolicoeur	
"I'm Just Ken"	Ryan Gosling	2023	Mark Ronson and Andrew Wyatt for the film Barbie	
"Lights"	Ellie Goulding	2011	Goulding, Richard Stannard, and Ash Howes	
"If Ever I Would Leave You"	Robert Goulet	1960	Alan Jay Lerner and Frederick Loewe for the musical Camelot	
"7 Years"	Lukas Graham	2015	Lukas Forchhammer, Stefan Forrest, Morten Ristorp, and Morten Pilegaard	
"Keep Your Head Up"	Andy Grammer	2010	Grammer	
"Dark Star"	Grateful Dead	1968	the Grateful Dead and Robert Hunter	
"Heather"	Conan Gray	2020	Gray	
"Let's Stay Together"	Al Green	1971	Green, Al Jackson Jr., and Willie Mitchell	
"Fuck You"	CeeLo Green	2010	Green, Bruno Mars, Philip Lawrence, Ari Levine, and Brody Brown	
"American Idiot"	Green Day	2004	Billie Joe Armstrong	
"God Bless the USA"	Lee Greenwood	1984	An American patriotic song Greenwood	
"Highway Tune"	Greta Van Fleet	2017	Jacob Kiszka, Joshua Kiszka, Samuel Kiszka, and Daniel Wagner	
"You Raise Me Up"	Josh Groban	2003	Brendan Graham and Rolf Løvland in 2001 for Løvland's band Secret Garden	
"Without You"	David Guetta	2011	Jacob Cruz, Usher Raymond IV, Rico Love, Guetta, Giorgio Tuinfort, and Frédéric Riesterer	
"Welcome to the Jungle"	Guns N' Roses	1987	Guns N' Roses. Named the greatest hard rock song of all time by VH1 in 2009.	
=== H ===
"Best Part"	H.E.R.	2017	Daniel Caesar, Gabi Wilson, and Teddy Genius as a collaboration between H.E.R. and Caesar	
"The Wire"	Haim	2013	Alana Haim, Danielle Haim, and Este Haim	
"Rock Around the Clock"	Bill Haley & His Comets	1954	Max C. Freedman and Jimmy De Knight	
"Maneater"	Hall & Oates	1982	Sara Allen, Daryl Hall, and John Oates	
"New Americana"	Halsey	2015	Ashley Frangipane, Larzz Principato, Kalkutta, and James Mtume	
"My Sweet Lord"	George Harrison	1970	Harrison as his debut solo single. The first number-one single by an ex-Beatle member in the United Kingdom and the United States.	
"Foxy Lady"	Jimi Hendrix	1967	Hendrix for the Jimi Hendrix Experience	
"Stars Are Blind"	Paris Hilton	2006	Fernando Garibay, Sheppard Solomon, and Ralph McCarthy as the lead single from her debut studio album Paris	
"Lips of an Angel"	Hinder	2005	Hinder, and Brian Howes	
"Sue Me"	Audrey Hobert	2025	Hobert and Matthew Fildey	
"Peggy Sue"	Buddy Holly	1957	Jerry Allison and Norman Petty (according to the official record, though Holly is known to be a principal songwriter too)	
"The Reason"	Hoobastank	2003	Daniel Estrin (music) and Douglas Robb (lyrics)	
"Only Wanna Be with You"	Hootie & the Blowfish	1995	Mark Bryan, Dean Felber, Darius Rucker, and Jim Sonefield	
"Thanks for the Memory"	Bob Hope	1938	Composed by Ralph Rainger with Leo Robin	
"The Way It Is"	Bruce Hornsby	1986	Hornsby	
"I Will Always Love You"	Whitney Houston	1992	Dolly Parton and originally released by her in 1974 with Houston's cover of the song later being recorded as a part of the soundtrack to the film The Bodyguard (1992) starring Houston. Inducted into the National Recording Registry in 2019.	
"Take Me to Church"	Hozier	2013	Andrew Hozier-Burne	
"Don't You Want Me"	The Human League	1981	Jo Callis, Philip Oakey, and Philip Adrian Wright	
"Release Me"	Engelbert Humperdinck	1967	Eddie Miller and Robert Yount in 1949	
"Itsy Bitsy Teenie Weenie Yellow Polkadot Bikini"	Brian Hyland	1960	Paul Vance and Lee Pockriss	
=== I ===
"Pick Me"	I.O.I	2015	Midas-T for the contestants of Produce 101 (2016). Includes Korean language.	
"It Was a Good Day"	Ice Cube	1993	O'Shea Jackson, Marvin Isley, Rudolph Isley, O'Kelly Isley, Ernie Isley, Ronald Isley, and Chris Jasper	
"I Love It"	Icona Pop	2012	Charlotte Aitchison, Patrik Berger, and Linus Eklöw	
"Hero"	Enrique Iglesias	2001	Iglesias, Paul Barry, and Mark Taylor	
"Radioactive"	Imagine Dragons	2012	Alex da Kid, Ben McKee, Dan Reynolds, Daniel Wayne Sermon, and Josh Mosser	
"Torn"	Natalie Imbruglia	1997	Scott Cutler, Anne Preven, and Phil Thornalley for Preven in 1991 and later re-recorded with Cutler and Preven's band Ednaswap in 1995. Imbruglia, working with Thornalley, then covered the song for her debut studio album Left of the Middle (1997).	
"Drive"	Incubus	2000	Brandon Boyd, Mike Einziger, Chris Kilmore, Alex Katunich, and José Pasillas	
"Never Tear Us Apart"	INXS	1988	Andrew Farriss and Michael Hutchence	
"Ah! Leah!"	Donnie Iris	1980	Iris and Mark Avsec	
"The Unicorn"	The Irish Rovers	1968	Shel Silverstein	
"Run to the Hills"	Iron Maiden	1982	Steve Harris. First single with Bruce Dickinson as vocalist.	
"Beer"	The Itchyworms	2006	Jazz Nicolas and Jugs Jugueta	
=== J ===
"Blame It on the Boogie"	The Jackson 5	1978	Mick Jackson, Dave Jackson, and Elmar Krohn; originally recorded by Mick in 1977	
"Rhythm Nation"	Janet Jackson	1989	Jackson, James Harris III, and Terry Lewis	
"Heart Don't Lie"	La Toya Jackson	1984	Jackson, Amir Bayyan, and Donna Johnson. Jackson's highest-charting song on the U.S. Billboard Hot 100.	
"Billie Jean"	Michael Jackson	1983	Jackson and produced by Quincy Jones. Recorded in 1982. It introduced a number of Jackson's signatures, including the moonwalk.	
"Angel of My Dreams"	Jade	2024	Jade Thirlwall, Steph Jones, Mike Sabath, Pablo Bowman, Bill Martin, and Phil Coulter. Thirlwall's debut solo single.	
"At Last"	Etta James	1960	Mack Gordon and Harry Warren for the 1941 film Sun Valley Serenade, with James covering the song for her debut album of the same name (1960) from an arrangement by Riley Hampton that improvised on Warren's original melody. Inducted into the Grammy Hall of Fame in 1999 and the U.S. Library of Congress' National Recording Registry in 2009.	
"Super Freak"	Rick James	1981	James and Alonzo Miller	
"99 Problems"	Jay-Z	2004	Shawn Carter, Fredrick Rubin, Norman Landsberg, Felix Pappalardi, William Squier, John Ventura, Leslie Weinstein, Tracy Marrow, Alphonso Henderson, and Bernard Freeman	
"Gone till November"	Wyclef Jean	1997	Jean and Jerry Duplessis	
"Call Me Maybe"	Carly Rae Jepsen	2011	Jepsen, Josh Ramsay, and Tavish Crowe	
"Price Tag"	Jessie J	2011	Jessica Cornish, Lukasz Gottwald, Claude Kelly, and Bobby Ray Simmons Jr. Jessie J's first number-one single in Ireland, New Zealand, and her native United Kingdom.	
"I Love Rock 'n' Roll"	Joan Jett and the Blackhearts	1982	Alan Merrill and Jake Hooker. Originally recorded by Arrows in 1975.	
"The Middle"	Jimmy Eat World	2001	Jimmy Eat World	
"Don't Say You Love Me"	Jin	2025	Nathan Fertig and Wyatt Sanders	
"The Girl from Ipanema"	Antônio Carlos Jobim	1964	Jobim (music) and Vinicius de Moraes (lyrics) in 1962 for Pery Ribeiro, with Stan Getz and Astrud Gilberto's 1963 English recording becoming an international hit. Inducted into the Grammy Hall of Fame in 2000 and the Latin Grammy Hall of Fame the following year. Includes Portuguese language.	
"Piano Man"	Billy Joel	1973	Joel. Selected for preservation in the National Recording Registry.	
"Rocket Man"	Elton John	1972	John and Bernie Taupin	
"Slow Dancing in the Dark"	Joji	2018	George Miller and Patrick Wimberly	
"Leave (Get Out)"	JoJo	2004	Soulshock, Kenneth Karlin, Alex Cantrall, and Phillip "Whitey" White as JoJo's debut single	
"Burnin' Up"	Jonas Brothers	2008	Nicholas Jonas, Joseph Jonas, and Kevin Jonas II. The band's first top five single in the U.S. Billboard Hot 100 and their highest-charting song until "Sucker" (2019).	
"Jealous"	Nick Jonas	2014	Jonas, Nolan Lambroza, and Simon Wilcox. Jonas's highest-charting single on the U.S. Billboard Hot 100 and highest-selling single, with 3 million copies sold in his native United States.	
"He Stopped Loving Her Today"	George Jones	1980	Bobby Braddock and Curly Putman	
"Don't Know Why"	Norah Jones	2002	Written and originally recorded by Jesse Harris in 2000, with Jones covering the song for her debut studio album Come Away with Me (2002)	
"Me and Bobby McGee"	Janis Joplin	1971	Kris Kristofferson and Fred Foster and originally recorded by Roger Miller, with a posthumously released version by Joplin topping the Billboard Hot 100. Joplin's version was inducted into the Grammy Hall of Fame in 2002.	
"This Is How We Do It"	Montell Jordan	1995	Jordan, Oji Pierce, and Ricky Walters	
"Don't Stop Believin'"	Journey	1981	Jonathan Cain, Steve Perry, and Neal Schon	
"Love Will Tear Us Apart"	Joy Division	1980	Ian Curtis, Peter Hook, Stephen Morris, and Bernard Sumner	
"Riptide"	Vance Joy	2013	Joy	
=== K ===
"Stick Season"	Noah Kahan	2022	Kahan	
"Here Comes the Hotstepper"	Ini Kamoze	1994	Kamoze, Chris Kenner, Kenton Nix, and Salaam Remi	
"Carry On Wayward Son"	Kansas	1976	Kerry Livgren. Kansas's first top 20 hit song on the Billboard Hot 100.	
"Tusa"	Karol G	2019	Keityn, Karol G, Nicki Minaj, and Ovy on the Drums. Includes Spanish language.	
"Gabriela"	Katseye	2025	Andrew Watt, John Ryan, Ali Tamposi, Charlotte Aitchison, and Sara Schell. Includes Spanish language.	
"Somewhere Only We Know"	Keane	2004	Tim Rice-Oxley, Tom Chaplin and Richard Hughes.	
"When You Say Nothing at All"	Ronan Keating	1999	Paul Overstreet and Don Schlitz for Keith Whitley in 1988 with Keating covering the song for the soundtrack to the film Notting Hill (1999). Keating's debut solo single and number-one hit in Ireland, New Zealand, and the United Kingdom.	
"Should've Been a Cowboy"	Toby Keith	1993	Keith	
"Milkshake"	Kelis	2003	Pharrell Williams and Chad Hugo	
"I Believe I Can Fly"	R. Kelly	1996	Robert Kelly for the film Space Jam (1996)	
"Songbird"	Kenny G	1987	Kenny G. Song is instrumental.	
"Tik Tok"	Kesha	2009	Kesha Sebert, Lukasz Gottwald, and Benjamin Levin	
"Fallin'"	Alicia Keys	2001	Keys as the lead single from her debut studio album Songs in A Minor	
"Young Dumb & Broke"	Khalid	2017	Khalid Robinson, Joel Little, and Talay Riley	
"Black and Yellow"	Wiz Khalifa	2010	Cameron Thomaz, Mikkel S. Eriksen, and Tor Erik Hermansen	
"Ain't Nobody"	Chaka Khan	1983	David "Hawk" Wolinski	
"Pursuit of Happiness"	Kid Cudi	2010	Scott Mescudi, Evan Mast, and Mike Stroud	
"Stay"	The Kid Laroi	2021	Charlton Howard, Justin Bieber, Magnus Høiberg, Charlie Puth, Omer Fedi, Blake Slatkin, Michael Mule, Isaac de Boni, and Subhaan Rahmaan	
"Mr. Brightside"	The Killers	2004	Brandon Flowers and Dave Keuning	
"Ex's & Oh's"	Elle King	2014	King and Dave Bassett	
"Shame"	Evelyn "Champagne" King	1977	John H. Fitch Jr. and Reuben Cross	
"Toxic Girl"	Kings of Convenience	2001	Eirik Glambek Bøe and Erlend Øye	
"Sex on Fire"	Kings of Leon	2008	Kings of Leon	
"Louie, Louie"	The Kingsmen	1963	Richard Berry in 1955	
"Beautiful Girls"	Sean Kingston	2007	Kisean Anderson, Johnathan Rotem, Jerome Leiber, Michael Stoller, Ben E. King, and Peter Harrison	
"You Really Got Me"	The Kinks	1964	Ray Davies	
"Rock and Roll All Nite"	Kiss	1975	Paul Stanley and Gene Simmons	
"Girls Like Girls"	Hayley Kiyoko	2015	Kiyoko, Owen Thomas, and Lily-May Young	
"Midnight Train to Georgia"	Gladys Knight & the Pips	1973	Jim Weatherly	
"I'll Be Loving You (Forever)"	Jordan Knight	1989	Maurice Starr for Knight's band New Kids on the Block, with Knight on lead vocals	
"High Hopes"	Kodaline	2013	Steve Garrigan, Mark Prendergast, and Vincent May as the lead single from their debut studio album In a Perfect World	
"Celebration"	Kool & The Gang	1980	Ronald Bell, Claydes Charles Smith, George Melvin Brown, James "J.T." Taylor, Robert Spike Mickens, Earl Eugene Toon Jr. Dennis Ronald Thomas, Robert "Kool" Bell, and Eumir Deodato	
"Freak on a Leash"	Korn	1999	Jonathan Davis, James Shaffer, Reginald Arvizu, Brian Welch, and David Silveria	
"Let Love Rule"	Lenny Kravitz	1989	Kravitz as his debut single	
=== L ===
"Bad Habit"	Steve Lacy	2022	Lacy, Diana Gordon, John Kirby, and Britanny Fousheé	
"Need You Now"	Lady A	2009	Hillary Scott, Charles Kelley, Dave Haywood, and Josh Kear	
"Bad Romance"	Lady Gaga	2009	Stefani Germanotta and Nadir Khayat	
"Green & Gold"	Lianne La Havas	2015	La Havas	
"Not Like Us"	Kendrick Lamar	2024	Lamar as a diss track aimed at Drake that concluded their highly publicized feud	
"Whataya Want from Me"	Adam Lambert	2009	Max Martin, Pink, and Karl Schuster	
"Choosin' Texas"	Ella Langley	2025	Langley, Luke Dick, Miranda Lambert, and Joybeth Taylor	
"Lush Life"	Zara Larsson	2015	Emanuel Abrahamsson, Marcus Sepehrmanesh, Linnea Södahl, Fridolin Walcher, Christoph Bauss, and Iman Conta Hultén	
"I Need You Back"	Raymond Lauchengco	1982	Odette Quesada	
"Valentine"	Laufey	2022	Laufey and Spencer Stewart as the first single to her debut studio album Everything I Know About Love	
"Girls Just Want to Have Fun"	Cyndi Lauper	1983	Originally written and recorded by Robert Hazard in 1979	
"Complicated"	Avril Lavigne	2002	Lavigne, Lauren Christy, Scott Spock, and Graham Edwards	
"Daft Punk Is Playing at My House"	LCD Soundsystem	2005	James Murphy	
"Stairway to Heaven"	Led Zeppelin	1971	Jimmy Page and Robert Plant	
"Boston"	Stella Lefty	2026	Lefty, Grace Enger, Jacob Kasher Hindlin, Joe Reeves, and Noah Kahan	
"All of Me"	John Legend	2013	John Stephens and Toby Gad	
"Imagine"	John Lennon	1971	Lennon and Yoko Ono. Inducted into the Grammy Hall of Fame in 1999.	
"Shea Butter Baby"	Ari Lennox	2018	Courtney Shenade Salter, Jermaine Cole, Anthony Parrino, and Tim Schoegje for the soundtrack of the film Creed II (2018)	
"Box of Rain"	Phil Lesh	1970	Lesh and Robert Hunter for their band, the Grateful Dead	
"Perfect Night"	Le Sserafim	2023	Score (13), Megatone (13), Sofia Quinn, "Hitman" Bang, Amanda "Kiddo A.I." Ibanez, Marcus Andersson, Lauren Aquilina, Jorge Luis Perez Jr, Huh Yunjin, Niklas Jarelius Persson, Zikai, and Ninos Hanna	
"Great Balls of Fire"	Jerry Lee Lewis	1957	Otis Blackwell and Jack Hammer	
"Bleeding Love"	Leona Lewis	2007	Jesse McCartney and Ryan Tedder	
"Hanging by a Moment"	Lifehouse	2000	Jason Wade	
"The Wreck of the Edmund Fitzgerald"	Gordon Lightfoot	1976	Lightfoot. A tribute to the SS Edmund Fitzgerald, a boat that sank in 1975.	
"Old Town Road"	Lil Nas X	2018	Montero Hill, Trent Reznor, Atticus Ross, and Kiowa Roukema	
"Ransom"	Lil Tecca	2019	Tyler-Justin Sharpe, Danny Snodgrass Jr., and Nicholas Mira	
"XO Tour Llif3"	Lil Uzi Vert	2017	Symere Woods and Bryan Simmons	
"In the End"	Linkin Park	2001	Brad Delson, Chester Bennington, Joe Hahn, Mike Shinoda, and Rob Bourdon	
"Levitating"	Dua Lipa	2020	Lipa, Clarence Coffee Jr., Sarah Hudson, Stephen Kozmeniuk, and DaBaby. Recorded in 2018.	
"My Own Worst Enemy"	Lit	1999	Jeremy Popoff and A. Jay Popoff	
"Shout Out to My Ex"	Little Mix	2016	Chris Dunn, Edvard Førre Erfjord, Camille Purcell, Iain James, Perrie Edwards, Jesy Nelson, Leigh-Anne Pinnock, and Jade Thirlwall	
"Truth Hurts"	Lizzo	2017	Melissa Jefferson, Eric Frederic, Jesse Saint John, Steven Cheung, and Amina Bogle-Barriteau	
"Party Rock Anthem"	LMFAO	2011	David Listenbee, Stefan Gordy, Skyler Gordy, and Peter Schroeder	
"Footloose"	Kenny Loggins	1984	Loggins and Dean Pitchford for the film of the same name	
"Raining in Manila"	Lola Amour	2023	Pio Dumayas, Raymond King, and David Yuhico. Includes Tagalog language.	
"Cry Me a River"	Julie London	1955	Arthur Hamilton and first published in 1953	
"Amazed"	Lonestar	2000	Marv Green, Chris Lindsey, and Aimee Mayo	
"Jenny from the Block"	Jennifer Lopez	2002	Lopez, Troy Oliver, Andre Deyo, Samuel Barnes, Jean Claude Olivier, Jose Fernando Arbex Miro, Lawrence Parker, Scott Sterling, Michael Oliver, David Styles (rap version), and Jason Phillips	
"Royals"	Lorde	2013	Ella Yelich-O'Connor and Joel Little as Lorde's debut single	
"Cool for the Summer"	Demi Lovato	2015	Lovato, Savan Kotecha, Max Martin, Alexander Erik Kronlund, and Ali Payami	
"Love's Theme"	The Love Unlimited Orchestra	1973	Written and produced by Barry White. Song is instrumental.	
"Working for the Weekend"	Loverboy	1980	Paul Dean, Matt Frenette, and Mike Reno	
"Ho Hey"	The Lumineers	2012	Wesley Schultz and Jeremy Frates	
"Coal Miner's Daughter"	Loretta Lynn	1970	Lynn, based on her life growing up in rural Kentucky	
"We'll Meet Again"	Vera Lynn	1939	Ross Parker and Hughie Charles	
"Free Bird"	Lynyrd Skynyrd	1973	Allen Collins and Ronnie Van Zant for the band's debut studio album (Pronounced 'Lĕh-'nérd 'Skin-'nérd)	
=== M ===
"Midnight City"	M83	2011	Anthony Gonzalez, Yann Gonzalez, Morgan Kibby, and Justin Meldal-Johnsen	
"Thrift Shop"	Macklemore & Ryan Lewis	2012	Ben Haggerty and Ryan Lewis	
"Material Girl"	Madonna	1985	Peter Brown and Robert Rans	
"Rockstar"	Post Malone	2017	Austin Post, Sheyaa Abraham-Joseph, Olufunmibi Awoshiley, Louis Bell, Carl Rosen, and Jo-Vaughn Scott	
"California Dreamin'"	The Mamas & the Papas	1965	John and his wife Michelle Phillips in 1963 and first recorded by Barry McGuire	
"Beggin'"	Måneskin	2017	Originally Bob Gaudio and Peggy Farina in 1967 for the Four Seasons with Måneskin covering the song during the eleventh season of X Factor Italia (2017). A studio version of the cover then appeared on their debut extended play Chosen, released later that year.	
"I Write the Songs"	Barry Manilow	1975	Originally Bruce Johnston for Captain & Tennille with Manilow releasing his version a few months later for his album Tryin' to Get the Feeling	
"The Beautiful People"	Marilyn Manson	1996	Manson	
"Let Me Love You"	Mario	2004	Scott Storch, Kameron Houff, and Shaffer Smith	
"One Love"	Bob Marley	1965	Marley and Curtis Mayfield for the Wailers	
"Moves like Jagger"	Maroon 5	2011	Adam Levine, Benny Blanco, Ammar Malik, and Shellback	
"Just the Way You Are"	Bruno Mars	2010	Mars, Philip Lawrence, Ari Levine, Khalil Walton, and Khari Cain as Mars's debut solo single	
"Everybody Loves Somebody"	Dean Martin	1964	Irving Taylor and Ken Lane in 1947	
"Livin' la Vida Loca"	Ricky Martin	1999	Draco Rosa and Desmond Child. Inducted into the National Recording Registry in 2022.	
"Cry Baby"	Melanie Martinez	2015	Martinez, Jeremy Dussolliet, and Tim Sommers	
"Shackles (Praise You)"	Mary Mary	2000	Erica Atkins, Trecina Atkins, Warryn Campbell, Franne Golde, Dennis Lambert, and Duane Hitchings. Debut single by the duo, featured on their 2000 debut album.	
"Right Here Waiting"	Richard Marx	1989	Marx	
"Tadow"	Masego	2018	Micah Davis and Vincent Fenton	
"3AM"	Matchbox Twenty	1997	Rob Thomas	
"Jamie All Over"	Mayday Parade	2008	Jason Lancaster, Derek Sanders, Jeremy Lenzo, Alex Garcia, Jake Bundrick, and Brooks Betts	
"Your Body Is a Wonderland"	John Mayer	2002	Mayer	
"U Can't Touch This"	MC Hammer	1990	Stanley Burrell, James Johnson, and Alonzo Miller. Samples "Super Freak" by Rick James.	
"Beautiful Soul"	Jesse McCartney	2004	Adam Watts and Andy Dodd	
"Yesterday"	Paul McCartney	1965	McCartney and credited to Lennon–McCartney for their band, the Beatles. Inducted into the Grammy Hall of Fame in 1997.	
"Eve of Destruction"	Barry McGuire	1965	P. F. Sloan	
"Back at One"	Brian McKnight	1999	McKnight	
"Angel"	Sarah McLachlan	1998	McLachlan	
"American Pie"	Don McLean	1971	McLean	
"You Broke Me First"	Tate McRae	2020	McRae, Blake Harnage, and Victoria Zaro	
"Songbird"	Christine McVie	1977	Written and sung by McVie for her band Fleetwood Mac	
"Hiss"	Megan Thee Stallion	2024	Megan Pete, Shawn "Source" Jarrett, Joel Banks, and Taylor Banks	
"Jack & Diane"	John Mellencamp	1982	Mellencamp	
"Down Under"	Men at Work	1981	Colin Hay and Ron Strykert	
"There's Nothing Holdin' Me Back"	Shawn Mendes	2017	Mendes, Teddy Geiger, Geoff Warburton, and Scott Harris	
"Show Me How"	Men I Trust	2019	Emmanuelle Proulx, Jessy Caron, and Dragos Chiriac	
"Let It Go"	Idina Menzel	2013	Robert Lopez and Kristen Anderson-Lopez for the film Frozen	
"Enter Sandman"	Metallica	1991	Kirk Hammett, James Hetfield, and Lars Ulrich	
"Kids"	MGMT	2008	Andrew VanWyngarden and Ben Goldwasser	
"Careless Whisper"	George Michael	1984	Michael and Andrew Ridgeley in 1981	
"Bad and Boujee"	Migos	2016	Quavious Keyyate Marshall, Kiari Kendrell Cephus, Robert Mandell, Symere Bysil Woods, and Leland Tyler Wayne	
"Adorn"	Miguel	2012	Miguel Pimentel	
"Grace Kelly"	Mika	2007	Michael Penniman, Jodi Marr, John Merchant, and Dan Warner as the lead single of Penniman's (Mika's) debut studio album Life in Cartoon Motion	
"Super Bass"	Nicki Minaj	2011	Onika Maraj, Daniel Johnson, Esther Dean, Roahn Hylton, and Jeremy Coleman	
"Can't Get You Out of My Head"	Kylie Minogue	2001	Cathy Dennis and Rob Davis	
"Broken Wings"	Mr. Mister	1985	Richard Page, Steve George, and John Lang	
"Both Sides, Now"	Joni Mitchell	1969	Mitchell	
"Nobody"	Mitski	2018	Mitski	
"I Melt with You"	Modern English	1982	Robbie Grey, Gary McDowell, Richard Brown, Michael Conroy, and Stephen Walker	
"Float On"	Modest Mouse	2004	Isaac Brock, Dann Gallucci, Eric Judy, and Benjamin Weikel	
"Daydream Believer"	The Monkees	1967	John Stewart	
"Nights in White Satin"	The Moody Blues	1967	Written and composed by Justin Hayward	
"You Oughta Know"	Alanis Morissette	1995	Morissette and Glen Ballard	
"Return of the Mack"	Mark Morrison	1996	Morrison	
"Brown Eyed Girl"	Van Morrison	1967	Van Morrison	
"Everything Is Alright"	Motion City Soundtrack	2005	Joshua Cain, Jesse Johnson, Matthew Taylor, Tony Thaxton, and Justin Pierre	
"Ace of Spades"	Motörhead	1980	Eddie Clarke, Lemmy, and Phil Taylor	
"I'm Yours"	Jason Mraz	2008	Mraz	
"I Know a Place"	Muna	2016	Katie Gavin, Josette Maskin, and Gavin and Naomi McPherson	
"Snowbird"	Anne Murray	1969	Gene MacLellan. Inaugural song inductee of the Canadian Songwriters Hall of Fame in 2003.	
"Knights of Cydonia"	Muse	2006	Matt Bellamy	
"Merry Go 'Round"	Kacey Musgraves	2012	Musgraves, Josh Osborne, and Shane McAnally as the lead single from Musgraves's debut album Same Trailer Different Park (2013)	
"Welcome to the Black Parade"	My Chemical Romance	2006	Bob Bryar, Frank Iero, Ray Toro, Gerard Way, and Mikey Way	
"A Little Bit"	MYMP	2003	Originally Kara DioGuardi, Steve Morales, and David Siegel in 2001 for Jessica Simpson, with MYMP covering the song in 2003 for their debut studio album, Soulful Acoustic	
=== N ===
"Young Blood"	The Naked and Famous	2010	Thom Powers, Alisa Xayalith, and Aaron Short	
"I Can See Clearly Now"	Johnny Nash	1972	Nash	
"Mr. November"	The National	2005	Matt Berninger and Aaron Dessner	
"O.P.P."	Naughty by Nature	1991	Vincent Brown, Anthony Criss, Keir Gist, The Corporation, and Herb Rooney	
"Sweater Weather"	The Neighbourhood	2012	Jesse Rutherford, Zach Abels, and Jeremy Freedman	
"Hot in Herre"	Nelly	2002	Cornell Haynes, Pharrell Williams, Chad Hugo, and Charles Brown	
"OMG"	NewJeans	2023	Ylva Dimberg and Hanni, and composed by Park Jin-su of XXX, Dimberg, and David Dawood. Includes Korean language.	
"You Got It (The Right Stuff)"	New Kids on the Block	1988	Maurice Starr	
"I Honestly Love You"	Olivia Newton-John	1974	Jeff Barry and Peter Allen	
"So Sick"	Ne-Yo	2005	Mikkel S. Eriksen and Tor Erik Hermansen of Stargate, and Shaffer Smith	
"How You Remind Me"	Nickelback	2001	Chad Kroeger	
"Landslide"	Stevie Nicks	1975	Nicks for her band Fleetwood Mac	
"Be My Lady"	Martin Nievera	1983	Vehnee Saturno and originally interpreted by Pedrito Montaire for the 1983 Metro Manila Popular Music Festival before Nievera recorded the song for his debut album Martin.... Take One (1983)	
"Sister Christian"	Night Ranger	1984	Kelly Keagy	
"Nemo"	Nightwish	2004	Tuomas Holopainen	
"Smells Like Teen Spirit"	Nirvana	1991	Kurt Cobain, Krist Novoselic, and Dave Grohl	
"Closer"	Nine Inch Nails	1994	Trent Reznor	
"Fishin' in the Dark"	Nitty Gritty Dirt Band	1987	Wendy Waldman and Jim Photoglo	
"Don't Speak"	No Doubt	1996	Gwen Stefani and Eric Stefani	
"Hypnotize"	The Notorious B.I.G.	1997	Christopher Wallace, Sean Combs, Deric Angelettie, Ron Lawrence, Andy Armer, and Randy Alpert	
"Bye Bye Bye"	*NSYNC	2000	Kristian Lundin, Jake Schulze, and Andreas Carlsson	
"Fuck tha Police"	N.W.A	1989	O'Shea Jackson, Lorenzo Patterson, and Tracy Curry, and produced by Dr. Dre and DJ Yella	
=== O ===
"Elvira"	The Oak Ridge Boys	1965	Dallas Frazier; even though it was originally recorded by Frazier in 1965, The Oak Ridge Boys covered it for their 1981 album Fancy Free	
"Wonderwall"	Oasis	1995	Noel Gallagher	
"Caribbean Queen (No More Love on the Run)"	Billy Ocean	1984	Ocean and Keith Diamond	
"Thinkin Bout You"	Frank Ocean	2012	Ocean and Shea Taylor	
"Nothing Compares 2 U"	Sinéad O'Connor	1990	Prince for his band the Family for their sole 1985 self-titled album and was later covered by O'Connor for her second studio album, I Do Not Want What I Haven't Got (1990)	
"Come Out and Play"	The Offspring	1994	Dexter Holland	
"Wagon Wheel"	Old Crow Medicine Show	2004	Bob Dylan and Ketch Secor, recorded in 1973	
"What Makes You Beautiful"	One Direction	2011	Savan Kotecha, Rami Yacoub, and Carl Falk	
"Wherever you are"	One Ok Rock	2010	Takahiro Moriuchi for his friend's wedding. Includes Japanese language.	
"Counting Stars"	OneRepublic	2013	Ryan Tedder	
"Oh, Pretty Woman	Roy Orbison	1964	Orbison and Bill Dees	
"Crazy Train"	Ozzy Osbourne	1980	Bob Daisley, Osbourne, and Randy Rhoads	
"Your Love"	The Outfield	1986	John Spinks	
"Hey Ya!"	Outkast	2003	André Benjamin	
"Fireflies"	Owl City	2009	Adam Young	
=== P ===
"Addicted to Love"	Robert Palmer	1986	Palmer	
"I Write Sins Not Tragedies"	Panic! at the Disco	2005	Ryan Ross, Brendon Urie, and Spencer Smith	
"Last Resort"	Papa Roach	2000	Jacoby Shaddix and Tobin Esperance	
"Misery Business"	Paramore	2007	Hayley Williams and Josh Farro	
"Hope"	Arlo Parks	2021	Anaïs Marinho and Gianluca Buccellati	
"Jolene"	Dolly Parton	1973	Parton	
"Sleepyhead"	Passion Pit	2008	Michael Angelakos. Samples "Óró Mo Bháidín" by Mary O'Hara and "San Francisco Scene (The Beat Generation)" by Jack Kerouac.	
"Temperature"	Sean Paul	2005	Sean Paul Henriques, Adrian "IZES" Marshall, and Rohan "Snowcone" Fuller	
"More than This"	Liam Payne	2012	Jamie Scott for Payne's band One Direction	
"Fuck the Pain Away"	Peaches	2000	Peaches	
"Alive"	Pearl Jam	1991	Stone Gossard and Eddie Vedder. Pearl Jam's first song to receive a certification from the British Phonographic Industry.	
"Sailor Song"	Gigi Perez	2024	Perez	
"Firework"	Katy Perry	2010	Perry, Mikkel S. Eriksen, Tor Erik Hermansen, Sandy Wilhelm, and Ester Dean	
"Finally"	Cece Peniston	1991	Peniston, Felipe Delgado, E.L. Linear, and Rodney Jackson	
"I Don't Want It at All"	Kim Petras	2017	Aaron Jennings, Aaron Joseph, Henry Russell Walter, Petras, and Lukasz Gottwald as Petras's debut international single	
"West End Girls"	Pet Shop Boys	1984	Neil Tennant and Chris Lowe	
"Free Fallin'"	Tom Petty	1989	Petty and Jeff Lynne	
"Passin' Me By"	The Pharcyde	1993	Romye Robinson, Trevant Hardson, Emandu Wilcox, Derrick Stewart, and Juan Martinez-Luis	
"Home"	Phillip Phillips	2012	Greg Holden and Drew Pearson	
"You Enjoy Myself"	Phish	1988	Trey Anastasio	
"PPAP (Pen-Pineapple-Apple-Pen)"	Pikotaro	2016	Daimaou Kosaka	
"Get the Party Started"	Pink	2001	Linda Perry	
"Comfortably Numb"	Pink Floyd	1980	David Gilmour and Roger Waters	
"Just for Me"	PinkPantheress	2021	Alexander Crossan and PinkPantheress	
"Mr. Worldwide"	Pitbull	2010	Armando C. Pérez, Bryan Adams, Jim Vallance, Matthew Naples, James Sheffer, and Wayne Wilkins	
"Where Is My Mind?"	Pixies	1988	Black Francis	
"Hey There Delilah"	Plain White T's	2006	Tom Higgenson	
"I'm So Excited"	The Pointer Sisters	1982	Anita Pointer, June Pointer, Ruth Pointer, and Trevor Lawrence. Re-released as a remix in 1984.	
"Every Rose Has Its Thorn"	Poison	1988	Bret Michaels, C.C. DeVille, Bobby Dall, and Rikki Rockett. The band's only number-one hit in the United States.	
"Every Breath You Take"	The Police	1983	Sting. Most played song in radio history, according to BMI.	
"The Passenger"	Iggy Pop	1977	Pop and Ricky Gardiner	
"Dior"	Pop Smoke	2019	Bashar Jackson and Andre Loblack. Appears on all four of Pop Smoke's commercially released projects.	
"Suspicious Minds"	Elvis Presley	1969	Written and originally recorded by Mark James in 1968. Presley's version was his final No. 1 single on the U.S. Billboard Hot 100 and was inducted into the Grammy Hall of Fame in 1999.	
"Purple Rain"	Prince	1984	Prince for the film of the same name	
"A Whiter Shade of Pale"	Procol Harum	1967	Keith Reid, Gary Brooker, and Matthew Fisher. The band's first record to be released.	
"Satin Sheets"	Jeanne Pruett	1973	John Volinkaty and originally recorded by Bill Anderson and Jan Howard	
"Gangnam Style"	Psy	2012	Psy and Yoo Gun-hyung. Includes Korean language.	
"Fight the Power"	Public Enemy	1989	Carlton Ridenhour, Eric Sadler, Hank Boxley and Keith Boxley, originally written and recorded for Do the Right Thing (1989) and later included on the Fear of a Black Planet (1990) album.	
"Blurry"	Puddle of Mudd	2001	Wes Scantlin, Doug Ardito, and Jimmy Allen	
"Common People"	Pulp	1995	Jarvis Cocker, Russell Senior, Steve Mackey, Nick Banks and Candida Doyle	
"Don't Cha"	The Pussycat Dolls	2005	Anthony Ray, CeeLo Green, and Trevor Smith	
"Attention"	Charlie Puth	2017	Puth and Jacob Kasher. Puth's highest and longest charting entry as a solo artist on the U.S. Billboard Hot 100.	
=== Q ===
"Bohemian Rhapsody"	Queen	1975	Freddie Mercury	
"No One Knows"	Queens of the Stone Age	2002	Josh Homme and Mark Lanegan	
=== R ===
"Losing My Religion"	R.E.M.	1991	Bill Berry, Peter Buck, Mike Mills, and Michael Stipe	
"Creep"	Radiohead	1993	Radiohead	
"Diet Pepsi"	Addison Rae	2024	Addison Rae Easterling, Luka Kloser, and Elvira Anderfjärd	
"Baker Street"	Gerry Rafferty	1978	Rafferty	
"Killing in the Name"	Rage Against The Machine	1992	Tim Commerford, Zack de la Rocha, Tom Morello, and Brad Wilk.	
"Rainism"	Rain	2008	Jung Ji-hoon and Bae Jin-ryeol. Includes Korean language.	
"Tilted"	Rahim Redcar	2015	Héloïse Letissier as the English version of Letissier's (Redcar's) French single "Christine" (2014). Credited under Redcar's pseudonym, Christine and the Queens. Includes French language.	
"Northern Touch"	Rascalz	1998	Lyle Bismark, Kareem Blake, Christopher France, Jason Harrow, Romeo Jacobs, and Barry Leonard	
"Escapism"	Raye	2022	Rachel Keen, Mike Sabath, and Danielle Balbuena as Keen's (Raye's) first number-one single in the United Kingdom and first song to chart on the U.S. Billboard Hot 100	
"Under the Bridge"	Red Hot Chili Peppers	1992	Anthony Kiedis, Flea, John Frusciante, and Chad Smith. The band's highest-charting single, peaking at number two on the Billboard Hot 100.	
"Walk on the Wild Side"	Lou Reed	1972	Reed	
"Come In Out of the Rain"	Sheryn Regis	2004	Ernest Williamson, Curtiss Boone, and Nikos Lyras for Wendy Moten and originally released by her in 1992 with Regis covering the song for the reality competition show Search for the Star in a Million	
"Ridin' the Storm Out"	REO Speedwagon	1973	Gary Richrath	
"Meant to Be"	Bebe Rexha	2017	Rexha, Tyler Hubbard, Josh Miller, and David Garcia	
"Hello"	Lionel Richie	1983	Richie	
"Umbrella"	Rihanna	2007	Christopher Stewart, Kuk Harrell, Terius Nash, and Shawn Carter	
"I've Fallen for You"	Jamie Rivera	1988	Jay Donna Montelibano	
"Pink Pony Club"	Chappell Roan	2020	Roan and Dan Nigro	
"Dancing on My Own"	Robyn	2010	Robyn and Patrik Berger	
"Drivers License"	Olivia Rodrigo	2021	Rodrigo and Dan Nigro	
"The Gambler"	Kenny Rogers	1978	Don Schlitz in 1976	
"Alaska"	Maggie Rogers	2016	Rogers and Doug Schadt	
"Happy Trails"	Roy Rogers	1952	Dale Evans	
"Sally, When the Wine Runs Out"	Role Model	2025	Tucker Pillsbury, Noah Conrad, Annika Bennett, and Harrison Whitford	
"(I Can't Get No) Satisfaction"	The Rolling Stones	1965	Jagger–Richards. The band's first number one in the United States.	
"Blue Bayou"	Linda Ronstadt	1977	Roy Orbison and Joe Melson	
"APT."	Rosé	2024	Rosé, Amy Allen, Christopher Brody Brown, Rogét Chahayed, Omer Fedi, Phillip Lawrence, Bruno Mars, Theron Thomas, Henry Walter, Michael Chapman, and Nicholas Chinn for Rosé and Mars	
"Ain't No Mountain High Enough"	Diana Ross	1970	Nickolas Ashford & Valerie Simpson for the Tamla label of Motown, first successful as a 1967 hit single recorded by Marvin Gaye and Tammi Terrell, and became a hit again in 1970 when recorded by Ross. Ross's first solo number-one hit on the Billboard Hot 100 chart.	
"It Must Have Been Love"	Roxette	1987	Per Gessle and Clarence Öfwerman. The song became a worldwide hit after its 1990 re-release.	
"Sway"	Bic Runga	1997	Runga	
"Tom Sawyer"	Rush	1981	Rush and Pye Dubois	
"Forget Me Nots"	Patrice Rushen	1982	Rushen, Fred Washington, and Terry McFadden	
=== S ===
"Smooth Operator"	Sade	1984	Sade Adu and Ray St. John	
"The Journey"	Lea Salonga	1993	Julie Gold	
"Push It"	Salt-N-Pepa	1987	Hurby Azor and Ray Davies	
"Until I Found You"	Stephen Sanchez	2021	Sanchez and Stephen Carroll	
"Truly Madly Deeply"	Savage Garden	1997	Darren Hayes and Daniel Jones	
"XS"	Rina Sawayama	2020	Kyle Shearer, Chris Lyon, Nate Campany, and Sawayama	
"Rock You Like A Hurricane"	Scorpions	1984	Klaus Meine, Herman Rarebell, and Rudolf Schenker	
"Sicko Mode"	Travis Scott	2018	Jacques Webster II, Aubrey Graham, William Leonard Roberts II, Khalif Brown, John Hawkins, Chauncey Hollis, Ozan Yildirim, Cydel Young, Tim Gomringer, Kevin Gomringer, Mirsad Dervić, Rogét Chahayed, Brytavious Chambers, Michael Dean, Luther Campbell, Harry Wayne Casey, Richard Finch, Christopher Wallace, Osten Harvey, Bryan Higgins, Trevor Smith, James Jackson, Malik Taylor, Keith Elam, Christopher Martin, Kamaal Fareed, Ali Shaheed Muhammad, Tyrone Taylor, Fred Scruggs, Kirk Jones, and Chylow Parker	
"The Man Who Can't Be Moved"	The Script	2008	Mark Sheehan, Danny O'Donoghue, Steve Kipner, and Andrew Frampton	
"Kiss from a Rose"	Seal	1994	Seal Samuel	
"Breaking Up Is Hard to Do"	Neil Sedaka	1962	Sedaka and Howard Greenfield	
"Closing Time"	Semisonic	1998	Dan Wilson	
"This Is Me"	Keala Settle	2017	Benj Pasek and Justin Paul for the film The Greatest Showman (2017)	
"A Bar Song (Tipsy)"	Shaboozey	2024	Collins Chibueze, Nevin Sastry, Sean Cook, Jerrell Jones, and Mark Williams	
"It Wasn't Me"	Shaggy	2000	Orville Burrell, Rickardo Ducent, Shaun Pizzonia, Brian Thompson	
"Hips Don't Lie"	Shakira	2006	Shakira and Wyclef Jean	
"California Love"	Tupac Shakur	1995	Shakur, Roger Troutman, Larry Troutman, Mikel Hooks, Norman Durham, Ronald Hudson, Woody Cunningham, Joe Cocker, Chris Stainton, and James Anderson, and produced by Dr. Dre	
"I Love Your Smile"	Shanice	1991	Jarvis La Rue Baker, Sylvester Jackson, Narada Michael Walden, and Shanice Wilson	
"Thinking Out Loud"	Ed Sheeran	2014	Sheeran and Amy Wadge	
"Ol' Red"	Blake Shelton	2002	James "Bo" Bohon, Don Goodman, and Mark Sherrill	
"Chandelier"	Sia	2014	Sia Furler and Jesse Shatkin	
"You're So Vain"	Carly Simon	1972	Simon	
"The Sound of Silence"	Paul Simon	1964	Simon for Simon & Garfunkel	
"I Put a Spell on You"	Nina Simone	1965	Originally written and recorded by Screamin' Jay Hawkins in 1956 with Simone covering the song for her album of the same name released in 1965	
"Perfect"	Simple Plan	2003	Pierre Bouvier, Chuck Comeau, Arnold Lanni, Sébastien Lefebvre, and Jeff Stinco	
"Shadow"	Ashlee Simpson	2004	Simpson, Kara DioGuardi, and John Shanks	
"I Wanna Love You Forever"	Jessica Simpson	1999	Louis Biancaniello and Sam Watters	
"My Way"	Frank Sinatra	1969	Jacques Revaux, Gilles Thibaut, Claude François, and Paul Anka, and was first recorded by François in 1967	
"These Boots Are Made for Walkin'"	Nancy Sinatra	1965	Lee Hazlewood	
"Rush"	Troye Sivan	2023	Sivan, Brett Leland McLaughlin, Alex Chapman, Kaelyn Behr, Adam Novodor, and Kevin Hickey	
"Kiss Me"	Sixpence None the Richer	1998	Matt Slocum	
"Crank"	Slayyyter	2025	Slayyyter, Austin Corona, and Wyatt Bernard	
"When a Man Loves a Woman"	Percy Sledge	1966	Calvin Lewis and Andrew Wright	
"Duality"	Slipknot	2004	Slipknot	
"All Star"	Smash Mouth	1999	Greg Camp. Popularized in the 2001 film Shrek.	
"Bullet With Butterfly Wings"	The Smashing Pumpkins	1995	Billy Corgan	
"Stay with Me"	Sam Smith	2014	Smith, James Napier, William Phillips, Tom Petty, and Jeff Lynne	
"Yo Home to Bel-Air"	Will Smith	1992	Smith and Jeffrey Townes as DJ Jazzy Jeff & the Fresh Prince for the television series The Fresh Prince of Bel-Air	
"This Charming Man"	The Smiths	1983	Johnny Marr and Morrissey	
"Gin and Juice"	Snoop Dogg	1994	Cordozar Broadus, Andre Young, Harry Wayne Casey, Richard Finch, Steve Arrington, Mark Adams, Ray Turner, Steve Washington, Daniel Webster, and David Ruffin Jr.	
"Chasing Cars"	Snow Patrol	2006	Gary Lightbody, Jonny Quinn, Nathan Connolly, Tom Simpson, and Paul Wilson	
"Losing You"	Solange	2012	Solange Knowles and Dev Hynes	
"Smalltown Boy"	Jimmy Somerville	1984	Steve Bronski, Somerville, and Larry Steinbachek. Initially released with Bronski Beat. Re-recorded as "Smalltown Boy (Reprise)" in 2014.	
"Konstantine"	Something Corporate	2003	Andrew McMahon	
"I Got You Babe"	Sonny & Cher	1965	Sonny Bono. The first single from the duo's debut album.	
"Runaway Train"	Soul Asylum	1993	Dave Pirner	
"Black Hole Sun"	Soundgarden	1994	Chris Cornell	
"Rainbow"	South Border	2003	Jay Durias and Sharon Inductivo for the film Crying Ladies (2003)	
"Booster Seat"	Spacey Jane	2020	Amelia Murray, Caleb Harper, Kieran Lama, and Ashton Le Cornu	
"...Baby One More Time"	Britney Spears	1998	Max Martin as Spears's debut single	
"Fidelity"	Regina Spektor	2006	Spektor. Her highest-charting single around the world.	
"Wannabe"	Spice Girls	1996	the Spice Girls, Matt Rowe, and Richard Stannard	
"Maybe"	Sienna Spiro	2024	Spiro, Sal Was, and Max Wolfgang	
"Jessie's Girl"	Rick Springfield	1981	Springfield	
"Born to Run"	Bruce Springsteen	1975	Springsteen	
"It's Been Awhile"	Staind	2001	Aaron Lewis, Mike Mushok, Johnny April, and Jon Wysocki	
"Photograph"	Ringo Starr	1973	Starr and George Harrison	
"Flowers on the Wall"	The Statler Brothers	1965	Lew DeWitt	
"Hollaback Girl"	Gwen Stefani	2005	Stefani, Pharrell Williams, and Chad Hugo	
"Born to Be Wild"	Steppenwolf	1968	Mars Bonfire. A popular song among biker culture.	
"The Joker"	Steve Miller Band	1973	Eddie Curtis, Ahmet Ertegun, Steve Miller	
"Chicago"	Sufjan Stevens	2005	Stevens	
"Maggie May"	Rod Stewart	1971	Stewart and Martin Quittenton	
"Plush"	Stone Temple Pilots	1993	Scott Weiland, Eric Kretz, and Robert DeLeo	
"I Wanna Be Your Dog"	The Stooges	1969	Dave Alexander, Ron Asheton, Scott Asheton, and Iggy Pop as the debut single from the band's self-titled debut album (1969)	
"Amarillo by Morning"	George Strait	1983	Terry Stafford	
"Last Nite"	The Strokes	2001	Julian Casablancas	
"As It Was"	Harry Styles	2022	Styles, Tyler Johnson, and Thomas Hull	
"You Make Me Feel Brand New"	The Stylistics	1973	Thom Bell and Linda Creed	
"Fat Lip"	Sum 41	2001	Deryck Whibley, Steve Jocz, Dave Brownsound, and Greig Nori	
"Last Dance"	Donna Summer	1978	Paul Jabara	
"Give a Little Bit"	Supertramp	1977	Rick Davies and Roger Hodgson	
"Stop! In the Name of Love"	The Supremes	1965	Holland-Dozier-Holland	
"Eye of the Tiger"	Survivor	1982	Frankie Sullivan and Jim Peterik for the 1982 film Rocky III.	
"The Ballroom Blitz"	The Sweet	1973	Nicky Chinn and Mike Chapman	
"Don't You Worry Child"	Swedish House Mafia	2012	Axel Hedfors, Steve Angello, Sebastian Ingrosso, John Martin Lindström, and Michel Zitron. The group's final single before their initial disbandment in early 2013.	
"Love Story"	Taylor Swift	2008	Swift. Re-recorded as "Love Story (Taylor's Version)" in February 2021.	
"Lose Control"	Teddy Swims	2023	Jaten Dimsale, Joshua Coleman, Julian Bunetta, Marco Rodriguez-Diaz Jr., and John Suduth	
"Fuel Injected"	Swollen Members	2001	Shane Bunting, Kiley Hendriks, and Daniel Denton	
"Chop Suey!"	System of a Down	2001	Serj Tankian and Daron Malakian	
"Kill Bill"	SZA	2023	Solána Rowe, Rob Bisel, and Carter Lang	
=== T ===
"Lovestained"	Hope Tala	2019	Tala	
"Once in a Lifetime"	Talking Heads	1981	David Byrne, Brian Eno, Chris Frantz, Jerry Harrison, and Tina Weymouth	
"The Less I Know the Better"	Tame Impala	2015	Kevin Parker	
"I Don't Care"	Eva Tanguay	1922	Jean Lenox and Harry O. Sutton. Recorded in 1905.	
"Fire and Rain"	James Taylor	1970	Taylor	
"Everybody Wants to Rule the World"	Tears for Fears	1985	Roland Orzabal, Ian Stanley, and Chris Hughes	
"On the Good Ship Lollipop"	Shirley Temple	1934	Composed by Richard A. Whiting with lyrics by Sidney Clare	
"My Girl"	The Temptations	1964	Smokey Robinson and Ronald White of the Miracles. It was selected for preservation in the National Recording Registry by the Library of Congress as being "culturally, historically, or aesthetically significant" in 2017.	
"Love Me JeJe"	Tems	2024	Temilade Openiyi and Seyi Sodimu. Interpolates "Love Me Jeje" by Seyi Sodimu.	
"Tribute"	Tenacious D	2002	Jack Black and Kyle Gass	
"Blurred Lines"	Robin Thicke	2013	Thicke, Pharrell Williams, Clifford Harris Jr., Ed Townsend, and Marvin Gaye. Samples Gaye's "Got To Give It Up".	
"The Boys Are Back in Town"	Thin Lizzy	1976	Phil Lynott	
"Semi-Charmed Life"	Third Eye Blind	1997	Stephan Jenkins	
"The Kill"	Thirty Seconds to Mars	2006	Jared Leto	
"Bad to the Bone"	George Thorogood	1982	Thorogood	
"I Hate Everything About You"	Three Days Grace	2003	Adam Gontier	
"Joy to the World"	Three Dog Night	1971	Hoyt Axton	
"I Think We're Alone Now"	Tiffany	1987	Originally Ritchie Cordell in 1966 for Tommy James and the Shondells with Tiffany covering the song in 1987 for her eponymous debut album	
"SexyBack"	Justin Timberlake	2006	Justin Timberlake, Timothy Mosley, and Nate Hills	
"Tiptoe Through the Tulips"	Tiny Tim	1968	Al Dubin (lyrics) and Joe Burke (music)	
"Waterfalls"	TLC	1995	Marqueze Etheridge, Lisa Lopes, and Organized Noize	
"Dance Monkey"	Tones and I	2019	Toni Watson	
"Lateralus"	Tool	2002	Danny Carey, Justin Chancellor, Adam Jones, and Maynard James Keenan	
"Africa"	Toto	1982	David Paich and Jeff Porcaro	
"Ahead by a Century"	The Tragically Hip	1996	Rob Baker, Gord Downie, Johnny Fay, Paul Langlois, and Gord Sinclair	
"Drops of Jupiter (Tell Me)"	Train	2001	Train	
"All About That Bass"	Meghan Trainor	2014	Trainor and Kevin Kadish	
"Forever and Ever, Amen"	Randy Travis	1987	Paul Overstreet and Don Schlitz	
"Can I Kick It?"	A Tribe Called Quest	1990	Lewis Reed, Kamaal Fareed, and Ali Muhammad	
"Suddenly I See"	KT Tunstall	2005	Tunstall as her highest-charting single on the UK singles chart	
"What's Love Got to Do with It"	Tina Turner	1984	Graham Lyle and Terry Britten	
"Happy Together"	The Turtles	1967	Alan Gordon and Garry Bonner	
"Man! I Feel Like a Woman!"	Shania Twain	1999	Twain and Robert John "Mutt" Lange	
"Stressed Out"	Twenty One Pilots	2015	Tyler Joseph	
"We're Not Gonna Take It"	Twisted Sister	1984	Dee Snider	
"Hello Darlin'"	Conway Twitty	1970	Twitty	
"Total Eclipse of the Heart"	Bonnie Tyler	1983	Jim Steinman	
"Water"	Tyla	2023	Tyla Seethal, Ariowa Irosogie, Imani Lewis, Corey Marlon Lindsay-Keay, Samuel Awuku, Rayan El-Hussein Goufar, Olmo Zucca, Jackson Paul Lomastro, and Tricky Stewart	
"Earfquake"	Tyler, the Creator	2019	Tyler Okonma and Jordan Carter. Recorded in 2014.	
=== U ===
"Sunday Bloody Sunday"	U2	1983	U2	
"Red Red Wine"	UB40	1983	Neil Diamond	
"Before He Cheats"	Carrie Underwood	2006	Josh Kear and Chris Tompkins	
"Yeah!"	Usher	2004	Johnathan Smith, Christopher Bridges, Sean Garrett, Patrick Smith, Robert McDowell, James Phillips, and LaMarquis Jefferson	
"First Love"	Hikaru Utada	1999	Utada. Includes Japanese language.	
=== V ===
"Can't Take My Eyes Off You"	Frankie Valli	1967	Bob Crewe and Bob Gaudio	
"Dance with My Father"	Luther Vandross	2003	Vandross and Richard Marx	
"Jump"	Van Halen	1983	Michael Anthony, David Lee Roth, Alex Van Halen, and Edward Van Halen	
"On the Wings of Love"	Regine Velasquez	1999	Peter Schless and Jeffrey Osborne for the latter's original release in 1982 with Velasquez covering the song for her studio album R2K	
"Heroin"	The Velvet Underground	1967	Lou Reed and produced by Andy Warhol	
"Bitter Sweet Symphony"	The Verve	1997	Richard Ashcroft	
"Y.M.C.A."	Village People	1978	Jacques Morali, Victor Willis, and Henri Belolo	
=== W ===
"Party Hard"	Andrew W.K.	2001	W.K.	
"Last Night"	Morgan Wallen	2023	John Byron, Ashley Gorley, Jacob Kasher Hindlin, and Ryan Vojtesak.	
"Are You Bored Yet?"	Wallows	2019	Dylan Minnette, Braeden Lemasters, Cole Preston, and Claire Cottrill as the lead single from Wallows' debut album Nothing Happens	
"Everybody Have Fun Tonight"	Wang Chung	1986	Nick Feldman, Jack Hues, and Peter Wolf	
"Ordinary"	Alex Warren	2025	Alexander Hughes, Adam Yaron, Cal Shapiro, and Mags Duval	
"Regulate"	Warren G	1994	Warren Griffin III, Nathaniel Hale, Michael McDonald, Ed Sanford, Jerry Leiber and Mike Stoller	
"Kingston"	Faye Webster	2019	Webster	
"Blinding Lights"	The Weeknd	2019	Abel Tesfaye, Ahmad Balshe, Jason Quenneville, Max Martin, and Oscar Holter	
"Buddy Holly"	Weezer	1994	Rivers Cuomo	
"One More Saturday Night"	Bob Weir	1972	Weir for his band, the Grateful Dead	
"Dog Days Are Over"	Florence Welch	2008	Welch and Isabella Summers for their band Florence and the Machine	
"Flying Without Wings"	Westlife	1999	Steve Mac and Wayne Hector	
"Movies"	Weyes Blood	2019	Natalie Mering	
"Wake Me Up Before You Go-Go"	Wham!	1984	George Michael	
"Here I Go Again"	Whitesnake	1982	David Coverdale and Bernie Marsden	
"Seven Nation Army"	The White Stripes	2003	Jack White and Meg White. The song has grown in popularity due to its usage in sports.	
"My Generation"	The Who	1965	Pete Townshend. Part of The Rock and Roll Hall of Fame's 500 Songs that Shaped Rock and Roll. Inducted into the Grammy Hall of Fame in 1999.	
"Break My Stride"	Matthew Wilder	1983	Wilder and Greg Prestopino	
"Moon River"	Andy Williams	1962	Composed by Henry Mancini with lyrics by Johnny Mercer	
"Every Day I Have the Blues"	Joe Williams	1955	Aaron "Pinetop" Sparks and Milton Sparks	
"Happy"	Pharrell Williams	2013	Williams for the 2013 film Despicable Me 2	
"Angels"	Robbie Williams	1997	Williams and Guy Chambers	
"Save the Best for Last"	Vanessa Williams	1992	Phil Galdston, Wendy Waldman, and Jon Lind in 1989	
"Hold On"	Wilson Phillips	1990	Carnie Wilson, Chynna Phillips, and Glen Ballard	
"Rehab"	Amy Winehouse	2006	Winehouse	
"Higher Love"	Steve Winwood	1986	Winwood and Will Jennings	
"Ain't No Sunshine"	Bill Withers	1971	Withers	
"Don't Delete the Kisses"	Wolf Alice	2017	Ellen Rowsell, Jonathan Oddie, Joel Amey, and Theodore Ellis. The band's first single to chart on the UK Top 100.	
"I Hope You Dance"	Lee Ann Womack	2000	Mark D. Sanders and Tia Sillers	
"Superstition"	Stevie Wonder	1972	Wonder	
"Nobody"	Wonder Girls	2008	Park Jin-young and Rhee Woo-seok. It was the first song by a Korean artist to appear on the US Billboard Hot 100. Includes Korean, Japanese, and Chinese language.	
"Lucid Dreams"	Juice Wrld	2018	Jarad Higgins, Nick Mira, Danny Snodgrass Jr., Gordon Sumner, and Dominic Miller	
"Stand by Your Man"	Tammy Wynette	1968	Wynette and Billy Sherrill	
=== X ===
"Shooting Star"	XG	2023	Patrick "j.Que" Smith, Poe Leos, Xansei, AMarri Gildersleeve, Amelia Moore, Brooklyn Kenaisya Johnson, Clint Ford, Dayday, JAKOPS, Jason Jermaine Daxon, Matt Kali, Olay, Rambo Kay, Seann Bowe, and Sheldon Body Jr.	
=== Y ===
"Maps"	Yeah Yeah Yeahs	2003	Karen Orzolek, Nick Zinner, and Brian Chase	
"Ocean Avenue"	Yellowcard	2003	Ryan Key, Ben Harper, Pete Mosely, Longineu W. Parsons III, and Sean Mackin	
"Messy"	Lola Young	2024	Young and Conor Dickinson	
=== Z ===
"Clarity"	Zedd	2012	Anton Zaslavski, Holly Hafermann, Matthew Koma, and Porter Robinson	
"Pyramid"	Jake Zyrus	2010	David Jassy, Lyrica Anderson, Niclas Molinder, Joacim Persson, and Johan Alkenäs. Collaboration with Iyaz. Credited under Zyrus's pre-gender transition name "Charice".	

== See also ==
- List of non-English signature songs
- Honorific nicknames in popular music
- Subject (music)
- Theme music
- Trademark look
