= Kenny G Live =

Live

Live album by Kenny G
- Released: November 21, 1989
- Recorded: August 26 – September 29, 1989
- Genre: Jazz fusion
- Length: 73:15
- Label: Arista
- Producer: Kenny G

Kenny G chronology
Silhouette (1988)	Live (1989)	The Collection (1990)

Professional ratings
Review scores
Source	Rating
Allmusic	1.5/5 stars

Kenny G Live is the first live album by saxophonist Kenny G. It was released by Arista Records in 1989, and peaked at number 2 on the Contemporary Jazz Albums chart and number 16 on the Billboard 200. This album was recorded live at both Humphrey's Concerts By The Bay in San Diego, California. and also at the Seattle Center Opera House.

== Track listing ==
1. "Going Home" (Kenny G/Walter Afanasieff) - 5:29
2. "Sade" (Kenny G) - 5:49
3. "Silhouette" (Kenny G) - 9:17
4. "Midnight Motion" (Kenny G) - 8:23
5. "Home" (Kenny G) - 5:14
6. "Don't Make Me Wait for Love" (Lead vocal: Michael Bolton) (Narada Michael Walden/Preston Glass/Walter Afanasieff) - 7:13
7. "I've Been Missin' You" (Kashif/Kenny G) - 4:17
8. "Esther" (Kenny G/Lloyd Pianka) - 5:36
9. "Tribeca" (Kashif/Kenny G/Wayne Brathwaite) - 6:44
10. "Songbird" (Kenny G) - 10:38
11. "Uncle Al" (Kenny G/Lou Pardini) - 4:35

== DVD ==
1. "Sade"
2. "Silhouette"
3. "Midnight Motion"
4. "Uncle Al"
5. "Brogan" (Duet with Dudley Moore)
6. "Against Doctor's Orders"
7. "Esther"
8. "Don't Make Me Wait For Love" (Duet with Michael Bolton)
9. "Going Home"
10. "Tribeca"
11. "Songbird"

== Musicians ==
- Kenny G – saxophones, all instruments (1)
- Walter Afanasieff – all instruments (1), additional keyboards (11)
- Robert Damper – keyboards (2–10)
- Lou Pardini – keyboards (11), drum programming (11)
- John Raymond – guitars (2–10)
- Vail Johnson – bass (2–10)
- John Keane – additional drums
- Bruce Carter – drums (2–5, 7, 10)
- Rayford Griffin – live drums (11)
- Paulinho da Costa – percussion (11)
- Michael Bolton – lead vocals (6)

== Production ==
- Kenny G – producer
- Mick Guzauski – engineer, mixing
- Trueman "Monty" Montfort – live show engineer
- Kevin Becka – additional engineer
- Gerry Brown – additional engineer
- Steve Smart – additional engineer
- Frank Wolfe – additional engineer
- Susan Mendola – art direction, design
- Rose Shoshana – photography
- Turner Management Group, Inc. – management

Studios

- Track 1 recorded at Studio G (Seattle, WA).
- Tracks 2–5, 7 & 10 recorded live at The Seattle Center Opera House (Seattle, WA); Remote recording by Turtle Recording.
- Tracks 6, 8 & 9 recorded live at Humphrey's Concerts By The Bay (San Diego, CA); Remote recording by Record Plant.
- Track 11 recorded at Westlake Audio (Los Angeles, CA) and Juniper Studios (Glendale, CA); Mixed at Conway Studios (Hollywood, CA).

== Charts ==
=== Weekly charts ===
Chart (1989–1990)	Peak position
Australian Albums (ARIA)	125
US Billboard 200	16
US Top Contemporary Jazz Albums (Billboard)	2
US Top R&B/Hip-Hop Albums (Billboard)	15

=== Year-end charts ===
Chart (1990)	Position
US Billboard 200	35
US Top R&B/Hip-Hop Albums (Billboard)	51

== Singles ==
Information taken from this source.

Year	Title	Chart positions		
Year	Title	US Hot 100	US AC	US R&B
1989	"Going Home"	56	5	46

== Certifications ==
Region	Certification	Certified units/sales
Brazil (Pro-Música Brasil)	Platinum	250,000^{*}
United States (RIAA)	4× Platinum	4,000,000^{^}
^{*} Sales figures based on certification alone.^{^} Shipments figures based on certification alone.
