= Don't Make Me Wait for Love =

Single by Kenny G with Lenny Williams

from the album Duotones
- B-side: "Midnight Motion"
- Released: August 1987
- Recorded: 1985–1986
- Genre: R&B, smooth jazz, soul, soul jazz
- Length: 4:06 (single); 4:45 (extended)
- Label: Arista
- Songwriters: Narada Michael Walden, Preston Glass, Walter Afanasieff
- Producers: Narada Michael Walden, Preston Glass

Kenny G with Lenny Williams singles chronology
"Songbird" (1987)	"Don't Make Me Wait for Love" (1987)	"Silhouette" (1988)

Music video
- "Don't Make Me Wait for Love" on YouTube

"Don't Make Me Wait For Love" is a song by Kenny G featuring Lenny Williams on lead vocals—the first single released from Kenny G's 1986 album Duotones. The song was written and composed by Walter Afanasieff, Preston Glass and Narada Michael Walden.

In the US, "Don't Make Me Wait For Love" first charted in December 1986 where it only peaked at number 77 on the Hot Black Singles chart. Later that year, the song's re-issue went on to reach number 17 on the Hot Black Singles chart and number 15 on the Hot 100 chart. "Don't Make Me Wait For Love" had its best showing on the Adult Contemporary music charts, where it peaked at number 2.

== Credits and personnel ==
- Kenny G: tenor saxophone
- Lenny Williams: lead and background vocals
- Walter Afanasieff: songwriter, keyboards, synthesizers
- Preston Glass: songwriter, producer, synthesizers, drum programming, background vocals
- Narada Michael Walden: songwriter, executive producer, additional arrangements
- Randy Jackson: Moog Source synth bass
- Claytoven Richardson, Karen "Kitty Beethoven" Brewington, Gina Glass, Yolanda Glass – background vocals

== Chart positions ==
Chart (1986–87)	Peak position
U.S. Billboard Hot Black Singles	77

Chart (1987)	Peak position
Canada Adult Contemporary (RPM)	1
U.S. Billboard Hot 100	15
U.S. Billboard Adult Contemporary	2
U.S. Billboard Hot Black Singles	17

== Live Recordings ==
- Michael Bolton was the guest lead vocalist for the live version of the song in Kenny's 1989 Kenny G Live recording.
