= Silhouette (album) =

Studio album by Kenny G
- Released: October 4, 1988
- Recorded: 1987–1988
- Studio: Studio G and The Music Source (Seattle, Washington); Westlake Audio and Lion Share Studios (Los Angeles, California); Mad Dog Studios, Alpha Studios and Red Zone Studios (Burbank, California); Conway Recording Studios (Hollywood, California); Tarpan Studios (San Rafael, California)
- Genre: Smooth jazz; jazz-funk
- Length: 48:35
- Label: Arista
- Producer: Kenny G; Rick Chudacoff; Peter Bunetta; Preston Glass

Kenny G chronology
Duotones (1986)	Silhouette (1988)	Kenny G Live (1989)

Singles from Silhouette
- 1. "Silhouette" Released: October 8, 1988; 2. "We've Saved the Best for Last" Released: January 1989; 3. "Against Doctor's Orders" Released: April 1989

Professional ratings
Review scores
Source	Rating
AllMusic	3/5 stars

Silhouette is the fifth studio album by American saxophonist Kenny G. It was released by Arista Records in 1988, and reached number 1 on the Contemporary Jazz Albums chart, number 8 on the Billboard 200, and number 10 on the R&B/Hip-Hop Albums chart.

== Track listing ==
1. "Silhouette" (Kenny G) - 5:25
2. "Tradewinds" (Kenny G) - 4:12
3. "I'll Be Alright" (Lead vocal: Andre Montague) (Douglas Cooper Getschal/Lyndie White) - 4:08
4. "Against Doctor's Orders" (Alan Glass/Kenny G/Preston Glass) - 4:44
5. "Pastel" (Kenny G/Preston Glass/Walter Afanasieff) - 5:44
6. "We've Saved the Best for Last" (Lead vocal: Smokey Robinson) (Dennis Matkosky/Lou Pardini) - 4:20
7. "All in One Night" (Kenny G) - 5:19
8. "Summer Song" (Kenny G) - 4:34
9. "Let Go" (Kenny G) - 5:49
10. "Home" (Kenny G) - 4:20

== Personnel ==
- Kenny G – all other instruments (1, 7, 9), soprano saxophone (1, 5, 6), tenor saxophone (2, 3, 7, 8), Yamaha WX7 (2), wind synth (2), alto saxophone (4, 9, 10), arrangements (4)
- Walter Afanasieff – keyboards (1–3, 5), synth strings (7)
- Robbie Buchanan – keyboards (3)
- Preston Glass – keyboards (4), drums (4), arrangements (4)
- Bill Elliott – keyboards (6)
- Lou Pardini – keyboards (6, 10)
- Ren Klyce – Fairlight CMI (7)
- Roger Sause – keyboards (8)
- John Raymond – guitars (2, 4, 5, 8)
- Dann Huff – guitars (3, 6)
- Corrado Rustici – guitars (7)
- Vail Johnson – fretless bass (1, 2), bass guitar (2, 5), bass pops (4)
- Joe Plass – bass guitar (8)
- Peter Bunetta – bass drum (1), drums (3)
- Kenny McDougald – drums (2, 5, 8), live drums (9)
- Rick Marotta – drums (6)
- Tony Gable – percussion (2, 8), congas (4)
- Paulinho da Costa – percussion (4–6, 9)
- Jeff Pescetto – backing vocals (3)
- Leslie Smith – backing vocals (3, 6)
- Tim Stone – backing vocals (3)
- Patricia Henley – backing vocals (6)
- Ivory Stone – backing vocals (6)

== Production ==
- Kenny G – producer (1, 2, 4, 5, 7–10), engineer (9)
- Peter Bunetta – producer (3, 6)
- Rick Chudacoff – producer (3, 6)
- Preston Glass – co-producer (4)
- Gerry Brown – engineer (1, 2, 5, 9)
- Steve Smart – engineer (1)
- Mick Guzauski – mixing (1, 2, 4–6, 8–10), engineer (10)
- Frank Wolf – engineer (3, 6), mixing (3)
- Maureen Droney – engineer (4)
- Darren Klein – engineer (6)
- Dana Jon Chappelle – engineer (7), mixing (7)
- Gordon Lyon – engineer (8)
- Dave Raynor – engineer (8)
- Don Adey – assistant engineer (3)
- Steve Satkowski – assistant engineer (3, 6)
- Karl Gruenewald – assistant mix engineer (3)
- Bryan Arnett – assistant engineer (6)
- Stuart Hirotsu – assistant engineer (7)
- Susan Mendola – design
- Bernie Maisner – hand lettering
- Rose Shoshana – photography
- Turner Management Group, Inc. – management

== Singles ==
Year	Title	Chart positions		
Year	Title	US Hot 100	US AC	US R&B
1988	"Silhouette"	13	2	35
1989	"Against Doctor's Orders"	—	—	65
1989	"We've Saved the Best for Last"	47	4	18

== Certifications ==
Region	Certification	Certified units/sales
Canada (Music Canada)	Platinum	100,000^{^}
Hong Kong (IFPI Hong Kong)	Gold	10,000^{*}
United States (RIAA)	4× Platinum	4,000,000^{^}
^{*} Sales figures based on certification alone.^{^} Shipments figures based on certification alone.
