= Duotones =

1986 studio album by Kenny G

Studio album by Kenny G
- Released: September 29, 1986
- Recorded: 1985–1986
- Studio: Tarpan Studios (San Rafael, California); Studio G (Seattle, Washington)
- Genre: Smooth jazz; jazz-funk
- Length: 46:54
- Label: Arista
- Producer: Kenny G; Narada Michael Walden; Preston Glass

Kenny G chronology
Gravity (1985)	Duotones (1986)	Silhouette (1988)

Singles from Duotones
- 1. "Songbird" Released: March 1987; 2. "Don't Make Me Wait for Love" Released: August 1987

Professional ratings
Review scores
Source	Rating
AllMusic	4.5/5 stars

Duotones is the fourth studio album by American saxophonist Kenny G, released on September 29, 1986, by Arista Records. It features one of Kenny G's best-known songs, "Songbird", which reached number four on the US Billboard Hot 100.

The album peaked at number one on the Contemporary Jazz Albums chart, number five on the Jazz Albums chart, number six on the Billboard 200 and number eight on the R&B Albums chart. The album was later certified 5× Platinum by the RIAA.

== Track listing ==
CD track listing
No.	Title	Writer(s)	Lead vocal(s)	Length
1.	"Songbird"	Kenny G		5:03
2.	"Midnight Motion"	Kenny G		4:08
3.	"Don't Make Me Wait for Love"	Walter Afanasieff, Preston Glass, Narada Michael Walden	Lenny Williams	4:05
4.	"Sade"	Kenny G		4:20
5.	"Champagne"	Kenny G, Kenny McDougald		4:45
6.	"What Does It Take (To Win Your Love)"	Johnny Bristol, Vernon Bullock, Harvey Fuqua	Ellis Hall	4:06
7.	"Slip of the Tongue"	Preston Glass, Narada Michael Walden, Lloyd Pianka		4:53
8.	"Three of a Kind"	Kenny G, Preston Glass, Narada Michael Walden, Lloyd Pianka		4:46
9.	"Esther"	Kenny G, Lloyd Pianka		5:24
10.	"You Make Me Believe"	Walter Afanasieff, Kenny G, Preston Glass, Narada Michael Walden	Claytoven Richardson	5:19
Total length:				47:40

An alternate track listing of this album also exists. It includes a slightly altered track order. In addition, this version includes slightly longer versions of "Don't Make Me Wait For Love" and "What Does it Take (To Win Your Love)" and adds an extra track: "And You Know That". The track listing is as follows:

CD version 2 track listing
No.	Title	Length
1.	"What Does It Take (To Win Your Love)"	5:00
2.	"Midnight Motion"	4:08
3.	"Don't Make Me Wait for Love"	4:46
4.	"Sade"	4:20
5.	"Champagne"	4:45
6.	"And You Know That"	4:45
7.	"Slip of the Tongue"	4:53
8.	"You Make Me Believe"	5:19
9.	"Songbird"	5:03
10.	"Three of a Kind"	4:45
11.	"Esther"	5:25
Total length:		53:09

== Personnel ==
Musicians

- Kenny G – all saxophones, keyboards, synth bass, drum machine, backing vocals, all instruments (9), EWI controller (violins) (9)
- Walter Afanasieff – keyboards, synth bass
- Preston Glass – keyboards, drum machine, wind chimes (1), backing vocals
- Roger Sause – keyboards
- Alan Glass – guitars
- John Raymond – guitars
- Corrado Rustici – guitars
- Randy Jackson – bass guitar, synth bass
- Cory Lerios – synth bass, drum machine
- Joe Plass – bass guitar
- Gigi Gonaway – drums, percussion
- Kenny McDougald – drums
- Tony Gable – percussion
- Sal Gallina – EWI controller (string sounds, violins and French horns) (3)
- Kitty Beethoven – backing vocals
- Gina Glass – backing vocals
- Yolanda Glass – backing vocals
- Claytoven Richardson – backing vocals
- Lenny Williams – backing vocals

Production

- Narada Michael Walden – executive producer
- Preston Glass – producer
- Kenny G – co-producer (1, 2, 4, 9)
- Gordon Lyon – chief engineer
- Kay Arbuckle – assistant engineer
- Stuart Hirotsu – assistant engineer
- Matt Rohr – assistant engineer
- Jim Weyeneth – assistant engineer
- Ted Jensen – mastering at Sterling Sound (New York City, New York)
- Kevin K. Takishita – art direction, design
- Steven Rothfield – photography
- Kurt DeMunbrun – styling
- Fritz/Turner Management – management

== Charts ==
=== Weekly charts ===
Weekly chart performance
Chart (1986–1988)	Peak position
Australian Albums (ARIA)	28
Austrian Albums (Ö3 Austria)	11
Dutch Albums (Album Top 100)	23
German Albums (Offizielle Top 100)	21
New Zealand Albums (RMNZ)	20
UK Albums (OCC)	28
US Billboard 200	6
US Top R&B/Hip-Hop Albums (Billboard)	8

=== Year-end charts ===
1987 year-end chart performance
Chart (1987)	Position
US Billboard 200	15
US Top R&B/Hip-Hop Albums (Billboard)	6

1988 year-end chart performance
Chart (1988)	Position
US Billboard 200	59
US Top R&B/Hip-Hop Albums (Billboard)	60

== Certifications ==
Region	Certification	Certified units/sales
Canada (Music Canada)	Platinum	100,000^{^}
Hong Kong (IFPI Hong Kong)	Gold	10,000^{*}
Malaysia	—	11,000
United States (RIAA)	5× Platinum	5,000,000^{^}
^{*} Sales figures based on certification alone.^{^} Shipments figures based on certification alone.
