= We've Saved the Best for Last =

Single by Kenny G featuring Smokey Robinson

from the album Silhouette
- B-side: "Silhouette"
- Released: 1989
- Recorded: 1988
- Genre: Smooth jazz
- Length: 4:20
- Label: Arista
- Songwriters: Paul Gordon, Dennis Matkosky, Lou Pardini
- Producer: Walter Afanasieff

Kenny G singles chronology
"Against Doctor's Orders" (1989)	"We've Saved the Best for Last" (1989)	"Going Home" (1990)

Smokey Robinson singles chronology
"Love Don't Give No Reason" (1988)	"We've Saved the Best for Last" (1989)	"Indestructible" (1989)

"We've Saved the Best for Last" is a song by American saxophonist Kenny G featuring American singer Smokey Robinson, from his fifth studio album Silhouette. The song was released in 1989 as Kenny G's third single from the album. The song reached number 4 on US adult contemporary, number 47 on US Billboard Hot 100 and number 18 on US R&B chart.

== Background ==
The song is the second-most successful single from the album, after Silhouette reached number 13 on Billboard Hot 100 in 1988.

== Music video ==
A music video for the song was released in 1989, it features both Kenny G and Smokey Robinson as the performers, as G, Robinson, and their crew was preparing for the show, and when on stage.

== Track listing ==
No.	Title	Length
1.	"We've Saved the Best for Last" (featuring Smokey Robinson)	4:20

== Personnel ==
- Kenny G – soprano saxophone
- Smokey Robinson – lead vocals
- Bill Elliott – keyboards
- Lou Pardini – keyboards
- Dann Huff – guitars
- Rick Marotta – drums
- Paulinho da Costa – percussion
- Patricia Henley – backing vocals
- Ivory Stone – backing vocals

== Charts ==
=== Weekly charts ===
Chart (1989)	Peak position
Canada Top Singles (RPM)	51
Italy Airplay (Music & Media)	11
US Billboard Hot 100	47
US Billboard Hot R&B Singles	18
US Billboard Adult Contemporary	4
