= Martin Nievera discography =

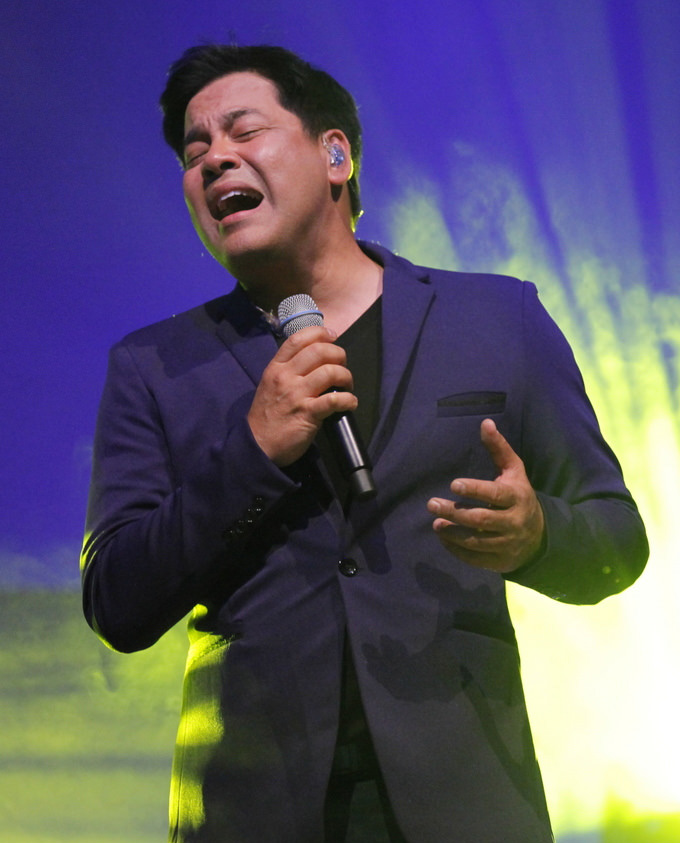
- Nievera performing at Sheraton Doha Resort & Convention Hotel in 2015
- Studio albums: 29
- Extended plays: 2
- Live albums: 2
- Compilation albums: 10
- Singles: 33
- Box sets: 2

Filipino singer-songwriter Martin Nievera has released 28 studio albums, 10 compilation albums, 2 live albums, 2 extended plays (EPs) and thirty-three singles.

== Albums ==
=== Studio albums ===
Year	Album details	Sales	Certifications (sales thresholds)
1983	Martin.... Take One: Released: June 1983; Label: Vicor; Formats: LP, Cassette, CD	PHI: 40,000+	PARI: Platinum
1984	The Best Gift: Released: July 1984; Label: Vicor; Formats: LP, Cassette, CD	PHI: 40,000+	PARI: Platinum
1985	Martin: Released: November 1985; Label: Vicor; Formats: LP, Cassette, CD	PHI: 40,000+	PARI: Platinum
1987	Miracle: Released: September 19, 1987; Label: Vicor; Formats: LP, Cassette, CD	PHI: 20,000+	PARI: Gold
1988	A Martin Nievera Christmas: Holiday album; Released: October 1988; Formats: LP, Cassette, CD; Label: Vicor	PHI: Gold	PARI: 20,000+
1989	Dream: Released: 1989; Label: Vicor; Formats: LP, Cassette, CD	PHI: 40,000	PARI: Platinum
1991	A New Start: Released: November 1991; Label: Dyna; Formats: LP, Cassette, CD	PHI: 20,000	PARI: Gold
1994	Roads: Released: September 16, 1994; Label: PolyCosmic; Formats: Cassette, CD	PHI: 80,000+	PARI: 2× Platinum
1997	Journeys: Released: December 1997; Label: PolyCosmic; Formats: Cassette, CD	PHI: 40,000+	PARI: Platinum
1998	Forever: Released: December 19, 1998; Label: PolyGram; Formats: Cassette, CD	PHI: 160,000+	PARI: 4× Platinum
1999	Forever, Forever: Released: 1999; Label: PolyGram/MCA Universal; Formats: Cassette, CD	PHI: 120,000+	PARI: 3× Platinum
1999	Return To Forever: Released: December 1999; Label: MCA Universal; Formats: Cassette, CD	PHI: 20,000+	PARI: Gold
2002	Chasing Time: Released: October 2002; Label: EMI Philippines; Formats: Cassette, CD	PHI: 40,000	PARI: Platinum
2003	Chasing Time II: Released: November 2003; Label: EMI Philippines; Formats: Cassette, CD	PHI: 20,000	PARI: Gold
2004	Unforgettable: Released: July 11, 2004; Label: EMI Philippines; Formats: Cassette, CD	PHI: 30,000	PARI: Platinum
2005	When Love Is Gone: Released: 2005; Label: EMI Philippines; Formats: Cassette, CD	PHI: 15,000	PARI: Gold
2006	Awit Ng Puso: Released: 2006; Label: EMI Philippines; Formats: Cassette, CD	PHI: 30,000	PARI: Platinum
2007	Milestones: Released: May 30, 2007; Label: EMI Philippines; Formats: Cassette, CD	PHI: 25,000	PARI: Platinum
2008	Ikaw Ang Aking Pangarap: Released: June 1, 2008; Label: EMI Philippines; Formats: CD, digital download	PHI:	PARI:
2008	My Christmas List: Holiday album; Released: June 18, 2008; Formats: CD, digital download; Label: EMI Philippines	PHI: –	PARI: –
2009	For Always: Released: May 1, 2009; Label: PolyEast; Formats: CD, digital download	PHI: –	PARI: –
2010	As 1 (with Gary Valenciano): Released: January 1, 2010; Label: PolyEast; Formats: CD, digital download		
2010	As Always: Released: February 22, 2010; Label: PolyEast; Formats: CD, digital download	PHI: –	PARI: –
2011	Himig Ng Damdamin: Released: April 1, 2011; Label: PolyEast; Formats: CD, digital download	PHI: –	PARI: –
2012	Mga Awit at Damdamin: Released: February 29, 2012; Label: PolyEast; Formats: CD, digital download	PHI: –	PARI: –
2012	No More Words (with Pops Fernandez): Released: May 3, 2012; Label: PolyEast; Formats: CD, digital download	PHI: –	PARI: –
2013	3D: Tatlong Dekada: Released: July 31, 2013; Label: PolyEast; Formats: CD, digital download	PHI: –	PARI: –
2015	Big Mouth Big Band: Released: May 5, 2015; Label: PolyEast; Formats: CD, digital download	PHI: –	PARI: –
2016	Kahapon... Ngayon: Released: May 30, 2016; Label: PolyEast; Formats: CD, digital download	PHI: –	PARI: –

=== Live albums ===
Year	Album details	Sales	Certifications
1987	Martin Nievera Live at the Ultra: Live album; Released: October 24, 1987; Formats: LP, cassette; Label: Vicor	PHI: –	PARI: –
2000	Martin Nievera Live with the Philippine Philharmonic Orchestra: Live album; Released: 2000; Formats: cassette, CD; Label: MCA Universal/Star	PHI: –	PARI: –

=== Extended plays ===
Year	Album details	Sales	Certifications
1996	You Are My Song: EP; Released: August 23, 1996; Formats: Cassette, CD; Label: PolyCosmic	PHI: 40,000+	PARI: Platinum
1997	What's on the Other Side: EP; Released: August 23, 1997; Formats: Cassette, CD; Label: PolyCosmic	PHI: –	PARI: –

=== Compilation albums ===
Year	Title	Philippines Sales	Certification
1986	Greatest Hits: Greatest Hits album; Released: August 1986; Formats: LP, Cassette, CD; Label: Vicor	PHI: –	PARI: –
1992	Greatest Hits Vol.2: Studio album; Released: 1992; Formats: Cassette, CD; Label: Vicor	PHI: –	PARI: –
1994	Ikaw Ang Lahat Sa Akin: Compilation album; Released: 1994; Formats: Cassette, CD; Label: Vicor	PHI: –	PARI: –
1994	Be My Lady: Compilation album; Released: 1994; Formats: Cassette, CD; Label: Vicor	PHI: –	PARI: –
2001	My Souvenirs: Compilation album; Released: September 12, 2001; Formats: Cassette, CD; Label: MCA Universal	PHI: 120,000+	PARI: 3× Platinum
2001	More Souvenirs: Compilation album; Released: November 2001; Formats: Cassette, CD; Label: MCA Universal	PHI: 40,000+	PARI: Platinum
2008	The Discography: Compilation album; Released: June 13, 2008; Formats: CD, digital download; Label: Vicor	PHI: –	PARI: –
2010	18 Greatest Hits: Compilation album; Released: May 14, 2010; Formats: CD, digital download; Label: Vicor	PHI: –	PARI: –
2010	Unforgettable Souvenirs: Compilation album; Released: 2010; Formats: CD, digital download; Label: PolyEast	PHI: –	PARI: –
2010	Duets (In Harmony): Compilation album; Released: August 15, 2010; Formats: CD, digital download; Label PolyEast	–	PARI: –

== Box sets ==
List of box sets with notes
Year	Details	Notes
2010	The Forever Collection: Released: 2010; Label: PolyEast; Format: CD	3-CD boxset containing Forever, Forever, Forever and Return to Forever.; Comes up in limited gold CDs, 24-bit remastering and audiophile recording.
2010	Unforgettable Souvenirs: Released: 2010; Label: PolyEast; Formats: CD	3-CD boxset containing two compilation album My Souvenirs and More Souvenirs and extra space for his 2004 studio album Unforgettable.

== Songs ==
=== Original songs (in alphabetical order, as solo artist) ===
- "A Brand New Christmas"
- "Buhay Mo, Buhay Ko" (inspirational song and tribute to Coronavirus pandemic in the Philippines)
- "Christmas Won't Be the Same Without You" (also covered by Pops Fernandez, Sarah Geronimo, Lani Misalucha & Richard Poon)
- "Each Day with You" (covered by Nyoy Volante)
- "Forever (duet with Regine Velasquez, also covered by Passage Band)
- "Giliw"
- "Hanggang Kailan"
- "Here To Give You Primetime" (duet with Pops Fernandez, first theme song of Studio 23)
- "How Can I"
- "I'll Be There for You" (also covered by Aiza Seguerra, Juris Fernandez and Jake Zyrus)
- "Ikaw ang Aking Pangarap"
- "Ikaw ang Lahat sa Akin" (also covered by Gary Valenciano)
- "Ikaw Lamang" (theme from ABS-CBN TV series Nasaan Ka Elisa)
- "It's Christmas Time"
- "On the Right Track"
- "Pag Uwi" (Grand Prize Winner, 2001 Metro Pop Song Festival)
- "Pain" (Grand Prize Winner, 1983 Metro Pop Song Festival; also covered by Lea Salonga)
- "Paradise"
- "Please Don't Throw My Love Away"
- "You Are My Life" (English version of "Buhay Mo, Buhay Ko")
- "You Are My Song" (also covered by Regine Velasquez)
- "You Are to Me"

=== Cover versions ===
- "Be My Lady" (originally by Pedritto Montaire; also covered by Matt Monroe Sr., Marco Sison and Jason Dy)
- "Say That You Love Me" (originally by Basil Valdez)
- "Kahit Isang Saglit" (originally by Vernie Varga)
- "Ikaw" (originally by Sharon Cuneta)
- "Because of You" (originally by Keith Martin; also covered by Jed Madela, Gary Valenciano, Kyla and Paolo Santos)
- "We Are the Reason" (also covered by Gary Valenciano)
- "Now and Forever" (originally by Richard Marx)
- "Come What May" (originally by Air Supply; also covered by Sharon Cuneta)
- "Maybe This Time" (originally by Michael Martin Murphy)
- "On the Wings of Love" (originally by Jeffrey Osborne)
- "Everything I Do (I Do It For You)" (originally by Bryan Adams)
- "You're My Everything" (originally by Santa Esmeralda)
- "Forever" (originally by Kenny Loggins)
- "When I Met You" (originally by APO Hiking Society)
- "Ikaw Lang ang Mamahalin" (originally by Joey Albert; also covered by Joey Generoso and Lani Misalucha)
- "Closer You and I" (originally by Gino Padilla)
- "Somewhere Down the Road" (originally by Barry Manilow)
- "Goodbye Girl" (originally by David Gates)
- "Right Here Waiting" (originally by Richard Marx; also covered by Sarah Geronimo)
- "Just Once" (originally by James Ingram; also covered by Jaya Ramsey)
- "Only Selfless Love 2" (also covered by Jamie Rivera, Jerome John Hughes and Karylle)
- "Narito" (originally by Gary Valenciano)
- "Iisa Pa Lamang" (originally by Joey Albert; also covered by Erik Santos and Gabby Concepcion)
- "Kung Ako Na Lang Sana" (originally by Bituin Escalante; also covered by Sharon Cuneta)
- "Before I Let You Go" (originally by Freestyle)
- "Can't Take My Eyes Off You" (originally by Frankie Valli)
- "Of All the Things" (originally by Dennis Lambert; also covered by Regine Velasquez)
- "The Search Is Over" (originally by Survivor; also covered by Rachelle Ann Go and Jed Madela)
- "Babalik Kang Muli" (originally by Regine Velasquez)
- "Habang May Buhay" (originally by AfterImage; also covered by Jaya Ramsey, Regine Velasquez, Sharon Cuneta and Angeline Quinto)
- "Bakit Labis Kitang Mahal" (originally by the Boyfriends; also covered by Lea Salonga and Dingdong Avanzado)
- "Kapalaran" (originally by Rico J. Puno; also covered by Radioactive Sago Project)
- "Sa Kanya" (originally by Ogie Alcasid; also covered by Zsa Zsa Padilla and M.Y.M.P.)
- "Pangako" (originally by Ogie Alcasid with Manilyn Reynes; also covered by Regine Velasquez)
- "After All" (originally by Peter Cetera and Cher; also covered by Vina Morales as the theme from the ABS-CBN TV series A Beautiful Affair)
- "The Times of Your Life" (originally by Paul Anka)
- "Maging Sino Ka Man" (originally by Rey Valera; also covered by Sharon Cuneta, Kim Molina, and Erik Santos)
- "Bato sa Buhangin" (originally by Cinderella; also covered by Ogie Alcasid and Juan Pablo Dream)
- "Gaano Kita Kamahal" (originally by Celeste Legaspi; also covered by Itchyworms)
- "Di Na Muli" (originally by Itchyworms; also covered by Janine Teñoso)
- "Maalala Mo Kaya" (originally by Dulce; also covered by Carol Banawa and Gary V.)
- "Kapantay Ay Langit" (originally by Amapola; also covered by Pilita Corrales and Janno Gibbs (feat. Pilita Corrales))
- "I Think I'm in Love" (originally by Kuh Ledesma; also covered by Marie Digby)
- "One Day in Your Life" (originally by Michael Jackson; also covered by Kyla)
- "Kay Ganda Ng Ating Musika" (originally by Hajji Alejandro, also covered by original composer the National Artist Ryan Cayabyab, Sarah Geronimo & Noel Cabangon)

== Compilation album appearances ==
- 6th Metro Manila Popular Song Festival (Vicor Music, 1983)
- Gold Ito! (Dyna Music, 1996)
- 2001 Metro Pop Song Festival (Infinity Music "now GMA Music Music Philippines, 2001)
- Only Selfless Love 2 (Universal Records, 2003)
- OPM Rewind (Universal Records, 2004)
- Best of OPM Inspirational Songs (Universal Records, 2005)
- OPM Superstars Christmas (Universal Records, 2006)
- Remember the OPM in the 80s (Vicor Music, 2007)
- Yes FM! It's Christmas Time (Vicor Music, 2007)
- Life Songs & Life Stories with Boy Abunda (Star Music, 2008)
- OPM Love Album (Universal Records, 2008)
- Musika at Pelikula: A Star Cinema Music Collection (Star Music, 2008)
- No.1 Signature Hits OPM's Best (Vicor Music, 2008)
- GV 25: All Star Tribute (Star Music, 2008)
- Kris Aquino the Greatest Love (Universal Records, 2008)
- Christmas Memories (Viva Records, 2008)
- Hanep! Ultimate Pinoy Hits Collection (PolyEast Records Philippines, 2008)
- OPM No. 1's (Star Music, 2009)
- No. 1 Signature Hits OPM's Best Vol. 2 (Vicor Music Corp., 2009)
- Senti 3 (Viva Records, 2009)
- Paalam, Maraming Salamat Pres. Aquino (A Memorial Tribute Soundtrack) (Star Music, 2009)
- I-Star 15: Best of TV & Movie Themes (Star Music, 2010)
- 60 Taon ng Musika at Soap Opera (Star Music, 2010)
- Senti Four It's Complicated (Viva Records, 2010)
- I Love You (Star Music, 2011)
- A Perfectly Acoustic Experience (PolyEast Records, 2011)
- Bida Best Hits da Best (Star Music, 2011)
- Biyahe Tayo (various artists) (2011)
- You're on the Right Track
