= MYMP discography =

- Studio albums: 6
- Live albums: 2
- Compilation albums: 2
- Singles: 15
- Video albums: 1
- Box sets: 2
- Other appearances: 8

The discography of MYMP, a Filipino acoustic band, consists of six studio albums, two live albums, two compilation albums, two box sets, one video album, and fifteen singles. The acoustic band had sold 285,700 album sales as of September 2009.

== Albums ==
=== Studio albums ===
| Year | Album details | Chart PH: | Certifications (sales thresholds) |
|---|---|---|---|
| 2003 | Soulful Acoustic: Released: August 4, 2003; Label: Ivory Music; Formats: CD, cassette, digital download | | PARI: Platinum; PHI sales: 30,000 |
| 2005 | Versions: Released: 2005; Label: Ivory Music; Formats: CD, digital download | | PARI: 7× Platinum; PHI sales: 210,700 |
| 2005 | Beyond Acoustic: Released: 2005; Label: Ivory Music; Formats: CD, LP, digital download | 6 | PARI: 7× Platinum; PHI sales: 210,700 |
| 2006 | New Horizon: Released: December 2006; Label: Ivory Music; Formats: CD, digital download | 3 | PARI: Platinum; PHI sales: 30,000 |
| 2008 | Now: Released: September 25, 2008; Label: Ivory Music; Formats: CD, digital download | | |
| 2014 | Electrified: 10th Anniversary Edition: Released: February 19, 2014; Label: PolyEast Records; Formats: CD, digital download | | |

=== Live albums ===
| Year | Album details | Certifications | Notes |
|---|---|---|---|
| 2006 | MYMP Live: Especially For You at the Music Museum: Released: 2006; Label: Ivory Music and Video / Myx; Formats: VCD/CD, DVD, digital download | PARI: Platinum; PHI sales: 30,000 | Concert |
| 2011 | The Unreleased Acoustic Collection: Released: 2011; Label: Galaxy Records; Formats: CD, digital download | | |

=== Compilation albums ===
| Year | Album details |
|---|---|
| 2008 | Absolute Acoustic: Released: 2008; Label: S2S Pte. Ltd. / Ivory Music and Video; Formats: 2×CD |
| 2009 | The High-Five Collection: Released: 2009; Label: Ivory Music; Formats: 2×CD, digital download |

=== Box sets ===
| Year | Album details |
|---|---|
| 2005 | Versions & Beyond: Released: 2005; Label: Ivory Music; Formats: 2×CD, digital download |
| 2012 | The MYMP Anthology: A Decade After: Released: 2012; Label: Ivory Music; Formats: 5×CD, digital download |

== Singles ==
List of singles, with year released and album name shown
| Title | Year | Peak chart positions | Album |
| Title | Year | KOR | Album |
|---|---|---|---|
| "A Little Bit" | 2003 | — | Soulful Acoustic |
| "Waiting in Vain" | 2004 | — | Soulful Acoustic |
| "Get Me" | 2005 | — | Versions and Beyond |
| "Tell Me Where It Hurts" | 2005 | — | Versions and Beyond |
| "Especially for You" | 2005 | 83 | Versions and Beyond |
| "Talaga Naman" | 2006 | — | Versions and Beyond |
| "I'll Never Get Over You Getting Over Me" | 2006 | — | MYMP Live: Especially For You at the Music Museum |
| "If You Asked Me To" | 2006 | — | MYMP Live: Especially For You at the Music Museum |
| "Nakapagtataka" | 2006 | — | MYMP Live: Especially For You at the Music Museum |
| "Soon It's Christmas" | 2006 | — | New Horizon |
| "With You" | 2006 | — | New Horizon |
| "Only Reminds Me of You" | 2007 | — | New Horizon |
| "So Perfect" | 2007 | — | New Horizon |
| "Now" | 2008 | — | Now |
| "Set You Free" | 2008 | — | Now |

== Other appearances ==
- Senti Four It's Complicated (Viva Records & Vicor Music, 2010) - "Only Reminds Me"
- May Bukas Pa album (Star Records, 2010) - "Nariyan Ka"
- Tambayan 101.9 compilation album (Star Records, 2009) - "To Love You More"
- Bagong Henerasyon: Bagong Himig (2009) - "Itaga Mo Sa Bato"
- Acoustic's Best (Ivory Music, 2009) - "Get Me"
- Soul Obsessions: Duets with Thor (Ivory Music, 2007) - "Be My Number Two"
- Ultraelectromagneticjam!: The Music of the Eraserheads: A Tribute to the Eraserheads (Volume 1) (Sony Music, 2005) - "Huwag Mo Nang Itanong"
- Jam88.3's Not Another Christmas Break (Sony Music, 2004) - "The Christmas Song"

== Soundtracks and non-album songs ==
- "Peng You (Kaibigan)", with Kim Chiu (2006) (original version by Emil Chau)
- "Power of Two" (original version by Indigo Girls)
- "Think of Laura" (original version by Christopher Cross)
- "Sa'Yo" - Wave 89.1 recording, South Border tribute
- "Tatak Exclusibo" (2006) - HBC commercial song
- "Torpe Song #5 Remix" - Jollibee commercial
- "Bida ang Saya" - Jollibee store ad
- "One Moment, One Nescafe" - Nescafe ad (radio)
- "Jam88.3 Jingle" - Jam88.3 ad
- "Love Will Keep Us Together", George and Cecil
- "Friend of Mine", Close to You
- "A Little Bit", Can This Be Love
- "Sa Bawat Sandali", indie film
- "Di Na Nag-iisa", Darna theme (sung by Regine Velasquez)
- "Crazy for You" (original version by Madonna)
- "Baby Now That I've Found You" (original version by The Foundations)
- "Sway" (original version by Bic Runga)
- "Emotion" (original version by Samantha Sang)
- "Till They Take My Heart Away" (original version by Clair Marlo)
- "It Might Be You" (original version by Stephen Bishop)
- "A Very Special Love", Kailan (scene where Sarah and John sing together on karaoke)
- "Katorse", Tamis ng Unang Halik (original version by Kristina Paner)
- "I Love You, Goodbye" (for the film I Love You Goodbye) (original version by Celine Dion)
