= Silhouette (Kenny G instrumental) =

Single by Kenny G

from the album Silhouette
- B-side: "Home"
- Released: 1988
- Genre: Smooth jazz
- Length: 5:25 (Album Version); 4:33 (Single Version)
- Label: Arista
- Songwriter: Kenny G

Kenny G singles chronology
"Songbird" (1987)	"Silhouette" (1988)	"Against Doctor's Orders" (1989)

Music video
- "Silhouette" on YouTube

"Silhouette" is an instrumental by American smooth jazz saxophonist Kenny G, from his fifth studio album of the same name, which was released in 1988.

== Chart performance ==
"Silhouette" peaked at No. 13 on the Billboard magazine Hot 100 chart, No. 2 on the Adult Contemporary chart, and No. 35 on the Hot R&B chart.

== Personnel ==
- Kenny G – all other instruments, soprano saxophone
- Walter Afanasieff – keyboards
- Vail Johnson – fretless bass
- Peter Bunetta – bass drum

=== Production ===
- Producers – Kenny G.
- Engineers – Steve Smart; Gerry Brown.
- Mixing – Mick Guzauski.
- Design – Susan Mendola
- Hand Lettering – Bernie Maisner
- Photography – Rose Shoshana
- Management – Turner Management Group, Inc.

== Charts ==
Chart (1988–89)	Peak position
U.S. Billboard Hot 100	13
U.S. Billboard Adult Contemporary	2
U.S. Billboard Hot Black Singles	35
