= Songbird (Kenny G composition) =

Single by Kenny G

from the album Duotones
- B-side: "Midnight Motion"
- Released: March 1987 (US); August 1987 (Australia)
- Recorded: 1986
- Genre: Smooth jazz
- Length: 5:03 (album version); 4:01 (single version); 4:09 (video version)
- Label: Arista
- Songwriter: Kenny G
- Producers: Kenny G; Narada Michael Walden; Preston Glass

Kenny G singles chronology
"What Does It Take (To Win Your Love)" (1986)	"Songbird" (1987)	"Don't Make Me Wait for Love" (1987)

Music video
- "Songbird" on YouTube

"Songbird" is a song by Kenny G, played on a soprano saxophone, and the third single from his 1986 album Duotones. It reached No. 3 on the Billboard Adult Contemporary chart, No. 4 on the Hot 100 chart, No. 4 on Cashbox and No. 23 on the R&B chart. In the UK the song peaked at no. 22.

When the song was released as a single in 1987, it became the first instrumental to reach the top 5 of the Billboard Hot 100 since 1985, when the "Miami Vice Theme" by Jan Hammer went to number one.

== Charts ==
Year-end chart (1987)	Position
US Top Pop Singles (Billboard)	55

== Certifications ==
Region	Certification	Certified units/sales
United States (RIAA)	Gold	500,000^{‡}
^{‡} Sales+streaming figures based on certification alone.
