= Lianne La Havas discography =

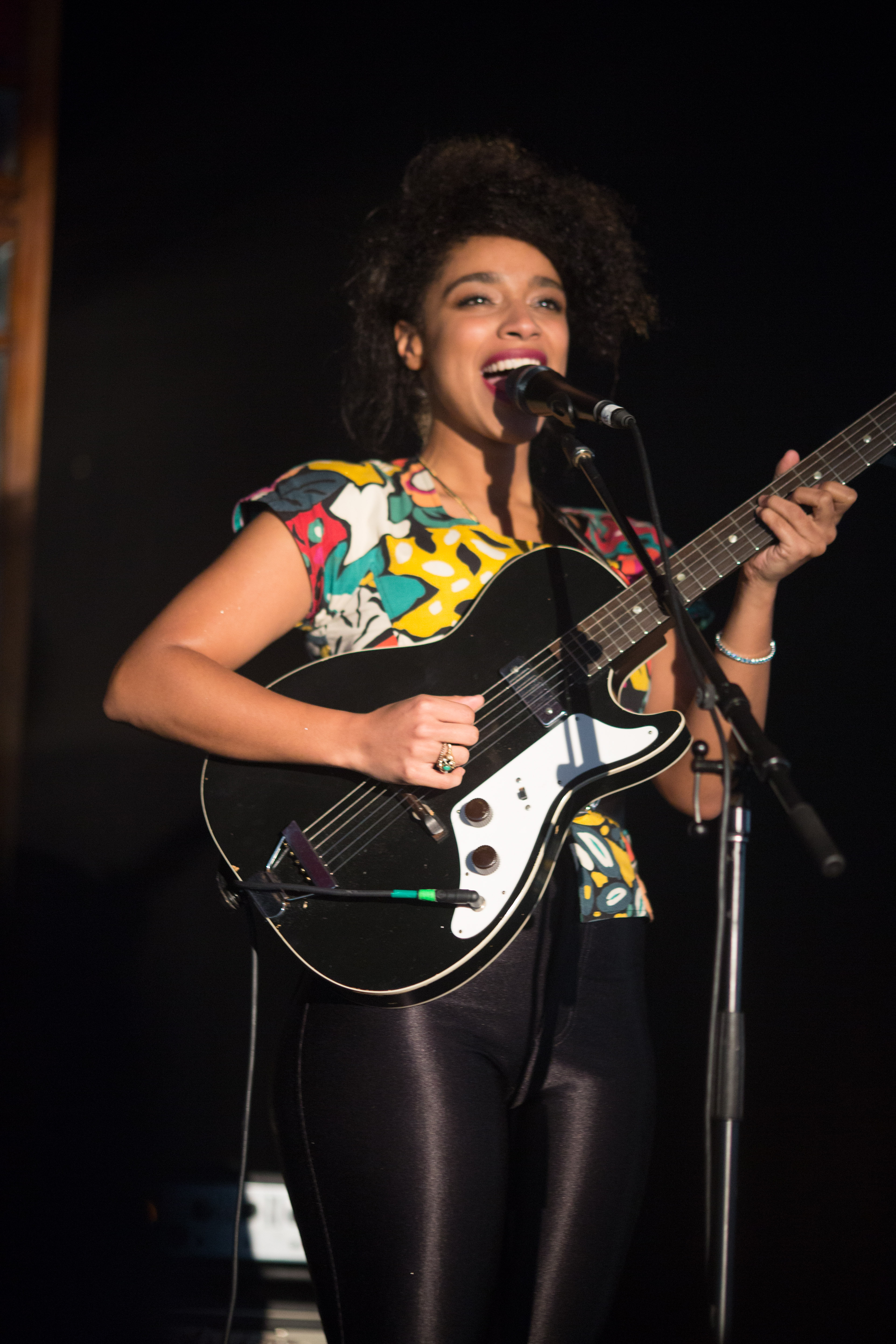
- Studio albums: 3
- Singles: 13
- Music videos: 11
- Extended plays: 7

The discography of Lianne La Havas, an English singer and songwriter, consists of three studio albums, seven extended plays, thirteen singles and eleven music videos. Born in London her career began after being introduced to various musicians and singer Paloma Faith, for whom she sang backing vocals. In 2010, Lianne signed to Warner Bros. Records, spending two years developing her songwriting before releasing any music.

Her debut studio album, Is Your Love Big Enough?, was released in July 2012, peaking at number 4 on the UK Albums Chart. The album was released to positive reviews from critics and earned her a nomination for the BBC's Sound of 2012 poll and awards for the iTunes Album of The Year 2012. The album includes the singles "No Room for Doubt", "Forget", "Lost & Found", "Is Your Love Big Enough?" and "Age".

Her second studio album, Blood, was released in July 2015, peaking at number 2 on the UK Albums Chart. The album includes the singles "Unstoppable" and "What You Don't Do".

== Studio albums ==
Title	Details	Peak chart positions										Certifications
Title	Details	UK	AUS	BEL (FL)	BEL (WA)	FRA	GER	IRE	NL	SWI	US	Certifications
Is Your Love Big Enough?	Released: 9 July 2012 (UK); Label: Warner Bros.; Format: CD, DL, streaming	4	—	27	66	96	30	21	3	32	142	BPI: Gold
Blood	Released: 31 July 2015 (UK); Label: Warner Bros.; Format: CD, DL, streaming	2	30	10	39	24	37	24	1	14	52	BPI: Silver
Lianne La Havas	Released: 17 July 2020; Label: Warner Bros.; Format: CD, DL, LP, streaming	7	—	8	49	106	20	71	9	6	— (Note: Lianne La Havas did not enter the US Billboard 200, but did peak at number 26 on the Billboard Top Album Sales chart.)	
"—" denotes releases that did not chart or not released to that country.

== Extended plays ==
Title	Details
Lost & Found	Released: 7 November 2011; Label: Warner, Labour of Love; Formats: Digital download, CD, 10" vinyl
Live in L.A.	Released: 2011; Label: Warner, Labour of Love; Formats: Free digital download
Forget	Released: 13 February 2012; Label: Warner, Labour of Love; Formats: Digital download, CD, 10" vinyl
Spotify Sessions	Released: 9 July 2012; Label: Warner; Formats: streaming
Spotify Sessions	Released: 17 July 2015; Label: Warner; Formats: streaming
Blood Solo	Released: 12 February 2016; Label: Warner, Labour of Love; Formats: Digital download
Live at the Roundhouse	Released: 18 December 2020; Label: Warner; Formats: Digital download

== Singles ==
Title	Year	Peak chart positions							Album
Title	Year	UK	BEL (FL) Tip	BEL (WA) Tip	KOR Intl.	NLD	US Adult R&B	US AAA	Album
"No Room for Doubt" (featuring Willy Mason)	2011	—	67	21	—	—	—	—	Is Your Love Big Enough?
"Forget"	2011	142	—	—	—	—	—	—	Is Your Love Big Enough?
"Lost & Found"	2012	126	—	—	99	—	17	—	Is Your Love Big Enough?
"Is Your Love Big Enough?"	2012	103	17	28	—	—	—	—	Is Your Love Big Enough?
"Age"	2012	—	43	—	—	96	—	—	Is Your Love Big Enough?
"Unstoppable"	2015	—	83	—	—	—	—	—	Blood
"What You Don't Do"	2015	—	43	—	—	—	18	—	Blood
"Green & Gold"	2015	—	31	42	—	—	—	—	Blood
"Say a Little Prayer" (live)	2016	—	3	—	—	—	—	—	Non-album singles
"Bittersweet"	2020	—	13	—	—	—	—	—	Lianne La Havas
"Paper Thin"	2020	—	—	—	—	—	—	—	Lianne La Havas
"Can't Fight"	2020	—	36	—	—	—	—	20	Lianne La Havas
"Weird Fishes"	2020	—	—	—	—	—	—	—	Lianne La Havas
"Please Don't Make Me Cry"	2020	—	—	—	—	—	—	—	Lianne La Havas
"Disarray"	2025								TBA
"—" denotes releases that did not chart or not released to that country.

== Other appearances ==
Year	Title	Album
2013	"Little Talks"	BBC Radio 1's Live Lounge 2013
2013	"A Little Respect" (Gareth Malone & Gareth Malone's Voices featuring Lianne La Havas)	Voices
2014	"Patterns" (Tourist featuring Lianne La Havas)	Patterns EP
2014	"Clouds" (Prince featuring Lianne La Havas)	Art Official Age
2014	"affirmation I & II" (Prince featuring Lianne La Havas)	Art Official Age
2014	"affirmation III" (Prince featuring Lianne La Havas and Paloma Ayana)	Art Official Age
2014	"Warm Foothills" (alt-J)	This Is All Yours
2014	"Baltimore"	Round Nina: A Tribute to Nina Simone
2015	"Eggshells" (Aqualung)	10 Futures
2015	"Needn't Speak" (Rudimental featuring Lianne La Havas)	We the Generation
2015	"Breath" (Rudimental featuring Lianne La Havas)	We the Generation
2015	"Mr. Nelson" (Prince featuring Lianne La Havas)	Hit n Run Phase One
2017	"The Cross" (Robert Glasper featuring Lianne La Havas and Common)	—N/a
2017	"When Your Light Goes Out" (Mr Jukes featuring Lianne La Havas)	God First
2017	"Starry Starry Night"	Loving Vincent
2019	"Feel" (Jacob Collier featuring Lianne La Havas)	Djesse Vol. 2
2020	"Timeless" (Oscar Jerome featuring Lianne La Havas)	Breathe Deep
2020	"Woman" (Nao featuring Lianne La Havas)	And Then Life Was Beautiful
2024	"Saudade dos aviões da panair (Conversando no bar)" (Milton Nascimento and Esperanza Spalding featuring Lianne La Havas, Maria Gadú, Tim Bernardes, and Lula Galvão)	Milton + Esperanza

== Music videos ==
Title	Year	Director(s)
"No Room for Doubt" (featuring Willy Mason)	2011	Rohan Blair-Mangat
"Forget"	2012	Danny Sangra
"Lost & Found"	2012	Colin Solal Cardo
"Is Your Love Big Enough?"	2012	—N/a
"Forget" (Version 2)	2012	Alex Southam
"Age"	2012	Will Abramson
"Elusive"	2013	Colin Solal Cardo
"Gone"	2013	Colin Solal Cardo
"Unstoppable"	2015	Olivier Groulx
"What You Don't Do"	2015	Leila & Damien de Blinkk
"Green & Gold"	2015	Ravi Dhar
"Tokyo"	2017	Ravi Dhar
"Paper Thin"	2020	Lianne La Havas
"Can't Fight"	2020	Kevin Morosky
"Weird Fishes"	2020	Jackson Ducasse
