= What the Night Delivers =

What The Night Delivers

Studio album by Scott Matthews
- Released: 5 September 2011
- Recorded: Artisan, Birmingham, England
- Genre: Folk
- Length: 50:51
- Label: San Remo
- Producer: Jon Cotton

Scott Matthews chronology
Elsewhere (2009)	What The Night Delivers (2011)	Home (Part 1) (2014)

Professional ratings
Review scores
Source	Rating
PopMatters	6/10 stars

What The Night Delivers is the third album of British singer/songwriter Scott Matthews. The album marks Matthews' return to San Remo and Passing Stranger engineer Jon Cotton. The album contains various songs written during the course of the previous two albums, along with new tracks.

The album was officially released on 5 September 2011, though the album was made available to fans on 26 June.

The first single, "Ballerina Lake", was released on 19 August 2011. A three-track EP of "Obsession Never Sleeps" was released on 25 August.

== Track listing ==
1. "Myself Again" – 5:15
2. "Obsession Never Sleeps" – 4:42
3. "Ballerina Lake" – 4:36
4. "Bad Apple" – 4:59
5. "So Long My Moonlight" – 4:29
6. "Head First Into Paradise" – 5:23
7. "Walking Home In The Rain" – 5:38
8. "Echoes Of The Lonely" – 4:06
9. "The Man Who Had Everything" – 5:45
10. "Piano Song" – 6:03

== Personnel ==
- Scott Matthews - vocals, guitars, bass guitar, sitar, theremin, piano
- Sam Martin - drums, percussion
- Danny Keane - cello
- Greg Stoddard - lap steel guitar
- Danny Thompson - double bass
- Jon Cotton - Hammond organ, piano, vibraphone
- Elspeth Dutch - French horn
- Brass and string arrangements - Danny Keane
- Produced, engineered, mixed and mastered by Jon Cotton
