= Bruno Major =

British singer-songwriter (born 1988)

- Born: Bruno Major; 15 July 1988 (age 38); Northampton, England
- Genres: R&B; pop
- Occupations: Singer-songwriter; guitarist
- Instruments: Guitar; piano; vocals
- Years active: 2010s–present
- Website: brunomajor.com

Bruno Major (born 15 July 1988) is a British singer-songwriter, guitarist and producer known for his blend of jazz-inflected pop, intimate lyricism and emotive vocal style. He has released three studio albums - "A Song For Every Moon" (2017), "To Let a Good Thing Die" (2020) and "Columbo" (2023) and has amassed over 2 billion streams worldwide. Major has sold out multiple headline tours across North America, Europe, Asia and Australia.

== Career ==
Early Work and "A Song For Every Moon" (2014-2018)

In 2014, Major released his debut EP "Live" on Virgin Records. After parting ways with the label, he launched a self-directed project in 2016 to write, record and release one song every month for a year. The project culminated in his critically acclaimed debut album "A Song For Every Moon" (2017), an R&B-tinged collection that established his reputation for intimate, narrative songwriting.

Following the release, Major embarked on extensive touring, including a headline run across North America, multiple sold-out shows in Europe, and support slots on the Sam Smith UK arena tour. He made his US television debut performing Easily on The Late Late Show with James Corden in February 2018, and appeared at Bonnaroo Music Festival the same year. His first Asia tour followed in late 2018.

"To Let a Good Thing Die" (2019-2022)

Major released his second album "To Let a Good Thing Die" in June 2020. The album included collaborations with producer Finneas and featured fan favourites such as "Nothing" and "The Most Beautiful Thing."

"Easily" from his debut album was certified Platinum in the United States and Gold in Canada and Australia while "Nothing" was certified gold in the United States and charted internationally, reaching No. 63 on the Irish Singles Chart

"Columbo" and Continued Success (2023 - Present)

In 2023, Major returned with his third studio album "Columbo", released on 14th July. Written largely on acoustic guitar and produced alongside longtime collaborator Finlay Robson (Phairo), "Columbo" was praised for its lyrical depth and musical range. Inspired by a period of personal transformation and self-reflection during and after the COVID-19 pandemic, the record explored themes of identity, love, loss and self-discovery.

The album was preceded by the singles "We Were Never Really Friends" and "Columbo" and features highlights such as "Tears in Rain", "Tell Her" and "You Take the High Road". Reinforcing Major's reputation as a captivating live performer, the release was followed by another sold-out global tour spanning 54 cities across 22 countries and drawing over 70,000 fans throughout Southeast Asia, North America, Europe, Australia and East Asia.

== Musical Style and Influences ==
Major’s sound blends elements of jazz, soul, and folk-pop, often built around intricate guitar work and introspective lyricism. He cites Nick Drake, and Chet Baker among his key influences. His songwriting approach emphasises lyrical substance and musical emotionality, often focusing on the interplay between words and melody.

== Personal life ==
Major is originally from Northampton, England. He moved to London in 2011. Originally a jazz musician, he began his career as a session guitarist at age 16 for artists including Lalah Hathaway. Major also studied for a degree in jazz at Leeds Conservatoire (formally Leeds College of Music).

He is the older brother of Dominic 'Dot' Major of London Grammar.

== Discography ==
=== Albums ===
Title	Details
A Song for Every Moon	Released: 31 August 2017; Label: Harbour, July (July-001); Format: digital download, CD, LP
To Let a Good Thing Die	Released: 5 June 2020; Label: Harbour, July (July-006); Format: digital download, CD, LP
Columbo	Released: 14 July 2023; Label: Harbour, July; Format: digital download, CD, LP

=== EPs ===
Title	Details
Live	Released: 21 January 2014; Label: Virgin Records; Format: digital download

=== Singles ===
Title	Year	Peak chart positions		Certifications	Album
Title	Year	UK Ind.	IRE	Certifications	Album
"Home" (Live)	2013	—	—		Live
"Wouldn't Mean a Thing"	2016	—	—		A Song for Every Moon
"There's Little Left"	2016	—	—		A Song for Every Moon
"The First Thing You See"	2016	—	—		A Song for Every Moon
"Easily"	2016	—	—	ARIA: Gold; RIAA: Platinum; MC: Platinum	A Song for Every Moon
"Home"	2016	—	—		A Song for Every Moon
"Like Someone in Love"	2017	—	—		A Song for Every Moon
"Just the Same"	2017	—	—		A Song for Every Moon
"Second Time"	2017	—	—		A Song for Every Moon
"Fair-Weather Friend"	2017	—	—		A Song for Every Moon
"Places We Won't Walk"	2017	—	—		A Song for Every Moon
"Cold Blood"	2017	—	—		A Song for Every Moon
"On Our Own"	2017	—	—		A Song for Every Moon
"I Think It Must Be Christmas"	2017	—	—		Non-album single
"Old Fashioned"	2019	—	—		To Let A Good Thing Die
"Nothing"	2019	30	63	RIAA: Gold	To Let A Good Thing Die
"Tapestry"	2019	—	—		To Let A Good Thing Die
"Figment of My Mind"	2020	—	—		To Let A Good Thing Die
"We Were Never Really Friends"	2023	—	—		Columbo
"The Show Must Go On"	2023	—	—		Columbo

=== Appears on ===
Year	Artist	Album	Song	Credit
2014		The Giver (film): Music Collection	"Children"	Performer
2016	Ward Thomas	Cartwheels	"Good On You"	Guitar
2016	Ward Thomas	Cartwheels	"Dirt and Gold"	Guitar
2016	Ward Thomas	Cartwheels	"Proof"	Guitar
2017	MJ Cole		"Shelter"	Feature
2018	SG Lewis	Dark EP	"Dreaming"	Feature
2019	Scary Pockets	Best of 2018		Guitar
2020	Lianne La Havas	Lianne La Havas	"Read My Mind"	Guitar, Piano
2021	Eloise	Somewhere in-Between		Performer, Arranger
2023	Acantha Lang	Beautiful Dreams	"Eventually"	Performer
2025	Adam Melchor	The Diary of Living	The Diary of Living	Performer

=== Writing, producing ===
Year	Artist	Album	Song	Credit
2016	Liv Dawson		"Tapestry"	Writer, producer
2016	Liv Dawson	Open Your Eyes	"Still"	Writer, producer
2016	Liv Dawson	Open Your Eyes	"Open Your Eyes"	Writer
2016	SG Lewis	Yours EP	"Yours"	Writer
2016	SG Lewis	Yours EP	"Holding Back"	Writer
2016	SG Lewis	Yours EP	"Gone"	Writer
2017	Jack Vallier	Rebekah	"Good for You"	Writer, producer
2017	Jack Vallier	Rebekah	"The Boy You Knew"	Writer, producer
2017	SG Lewis		"Times We Had"	Writer
2017	Sarah Close	Caught Up	"Perfect After All"	Writer, producer, Mixed by
2017	XamVolo	All The Sweetness On The Surface	"Old Soul"	Writer, producer
2017	Liv Dawson		"Somewhere Good"	Writer, producer
2017	Eliza	A Real Romantic	"Alone & Unafraid"	Writer, producer
2017	Tom Chaplin	Twelve Tales of Christmas	"Say Goodbye"	Writer
2018	Aquilo	ii	"The Road Less Wandered"	Writer
2018	Eloise		"You, Dear"	Producer
2018	Linden Jay, Roméo Testa, Serious Klein	You Should've Known	"God is Love"	Producer
2018	SG Lewis	Dark EP	"Dreaming"	Writer
2018	Eloise		"TTCL"	Producer
2019	MJ Cole	Waking Up EP	"Mercy"	Writer
2019	MJ Cole	Waking Up EP	"Serotonin"	Writer
2019	Eloise		"Left Side"	Producer
2019	SG Lewis	Dawn EP	"Rest"	Writer
2019	Tori Kelly	Inspired by True Events	"Sorry Would Go a Long Way"	Writer
2019	Tori Kelly	Inspired by True Events	"Before the Dawn"	Writer
2020	Lianne La Havas	Lianne La Havas	"Read My Mind"	Writer
2021	Eloise	Somewhere In-Between EP		Producer
2025	Adam Melchor	The Diary of Living	"The Diary of Living"	Writer
2025	Eloise	Chet Baker Reimagined	"That Old Feeling"	Producer

== Tour ==
=== Headlining ===
==== North American Tour (2018) ====
List of concerts, showing date, city, country, venue, opening acts
Date	City	Country	Venue
North America
16 February 2018	Seattle	United States	Barboza
17 February 2018	Vancouver	Canada	Fox Cabaret
18 February 2018	Portland	United States	Doug Fir
20 February 2018	San Francisco	United States	The Chapel
21 February 2018	Los Angeles	United States	Masonic Lodge
23 February 2018	Santa Ana	United States	Constellation Room
24 February 2018	San Diego	United States	The Casbah
27 February 2018	Chicago	United States	Schubas Tavern
28 February 2018	Toronto	Canada	The Drake
1 March 2018	Montreal	Canada	Mini Campus
2 March 2018	Boston	United States	Great Scott
3 March 2018	Philadelphia	United States	Johnny Brenda's
4 March 2018	Washington, D.C.	United States	Song Byrd
6 March 2018	New York City	United States	Bowery Ballroom
25 May 2018	San Jose	United States	The Ritz
26 May 2018	Sacramento	United States	Holy Diver
28 May 2018	Salt Lake City	United States	Kilby Court
29 May 2018	Denver	United States	Larimer Lounge
31 May 2018	Minneapolis	United States	7th Street Entry
1 June 2018	Madison	United States	High Noon Saloon
2 June 2018	Detroit	United States	Marble Bar
3 June 2018	Toronto	Canada	The Great Hall
4 June 2018	Pittsburgh	United States	Club Cafe
5 June 2018	Washington D.C.	United States	U Street Music Hall
7 June 2018	Charlotte	United States	Neighborhood Theatre
8 June 2018	Atlanta	United States	Aisle 5
10 June 2018	Manchester	United States	The Bonnaroo Music & Arts Festival
11 June 2018	Houston	United States	White Oak Music Hall
12 June 2018	Austin	United States	Stubb's Indoors
13 June 2018	Dallas	United States	Three Links
15 June 2018	Phoenix	United States	Valley Bar
16 June 2018	Las Vegas	United States	Bunk House

==== Asia Tour (2018) ====
List of concerts, showing date, city, country, venue, opening acts
Date	City	Country	Venue
Asia
7 October 2018	Tokyo	Japan	Shindaita Fever
8 October 2018	Yamagata	Japan	Hello Indie Festival
11 October 2018	Seoul	South Korea	Rolling Hall
12 October 2018	Beijing	China	Yugong Yishan
13 October 2018	Shanghai	China	Yuyintang
14 October 2018	Hong Kong	China	Mom Livehouse
17 October 2018	Singapore		Decline
18 October 2018	Singapore		Decline
20 October 2018	Bangkok	Thailand	Noma
21 October 2018	Kuala Lumpur	Malaysia	The Bee
23 October 2018	Manila	Philippines	Karpos Live
24 October 2018	Jakarta	Indonesia	Queen's Head

==== Tour of Planet Earth (2023) ====
List of concerts, showing date, city, country, venue, opening acts
Date	City	Country	Venue
Asia
7 August 2023	Tokyo	Japan	WWWX
8 August 2023	Tokyo	Japan	WWWX
10 August 2023	Seoul	South Korea	Yes24 Live Hall
11 August 2023	Seoul	South Korea	Yes24 Live Hall
13 August 2023	Bangkok	Thailand	Voice Space
15 August 2023	Manila	Philippines	New renter Theater
17 August 2023	Singapore		Capitol Theatre
19 August 2023	Jakarta	Indonesia	GBK Basketball Hall
20 August 2023	Kuala Lumpur	Malaysia	Zepp Kuala Lumpur
22 August 2023	Shanghai	China	Bandi Namco Dream Hall
24 August 2023	Guangzhou	China	Mao Livehouse
24 August 2024	Jakarta	Indonesia	LaLaLa Festival
27 August 2024	Chengdu	China	Full House
29 August 2024	Beijing	China	Full Of
31 August 2024	Shanghai	China	CP Hall
2 September 2024	Tokyo	Japan	Zepp Shinjuku
3 September 2024	Osaka	Japan	Umeda Club Quattro
5 September 2024	Taipei	Taiwan	Zepp New Taipei
7 September 2024	Manila	Philippines	PICC Plenary Hall
8 September 2024	Hong Kong		Tungo Po
11 September 2024	Manila	Philippines	PICC Plenary Hall
North America
4 September 2023	Denver	United States	Ogden Theatre
5 September 2023	Salt Lake City	United States	The Depot
7 September 2023	Vancouver	Canada	Commodore Ballroom
8 September 2023	Seattle	United States	The Showbox
9 September 2023	Portland	United States	McMenamins Crystal Ballroom
11 September 2023	San Francisco	United States	The Warfield
13 September 2023	Los Angeles	United States	The Wiltern
14 September 2023	Los Angeles	United States	The Wiltern
15 September 2023	San Diego	United States	The Observatory North Park
16 September 2023	Phoenix, Arizona	United States	The Van Buren
18 September 2023	Dallas	United States	Granada Theater
19 September 2023	Austin	United States	Mohawk
22 September 2023	Atlanta	United States	The Masquerade
23 September 2023	Nashville	United States	Brooklyn Bowl Nashville
25 September 2023	Chicago	United States	The Vic Theatre
26 September 2023	Toronto	Canada	History
29 September 2023	New York City	United States	Terminal 5
30 September 2023	Boston	United States	Roadrunner
1 October 2023	Washington, D.C.	United States	Howard Theatre
Europe
8 November 2023	Cologne	Germany	Club Bahnhof Ehrenfeld
9 November 2023	Berlin	Germany	Kesselhaus
11 November 2023	Antwerp	Belgium	Trix
12 November 2023	Amsterdam	Netherlands	Melkweg
14 November 2023	Paris	France	Le Trabendo
17 November 2023	Glasgow	United Kingdom	Saint Luke's
18 November 2023	Manchester	United Kingdom	Academy 2
21 November 2023	Dublin	Ireland	Vicar Street
23 November 2023	London	United Kingdom	O2 Forum Kentish Town
Oceania
13 January 2024	Auckland	New Zealand	Powerstation
15 January 2024	Sydney	Australia	Enmore Theatre
17 January 2024	Melbourne	Australia	Forum Theatre
19 January 2024	Brisbane	Australia	The Tivoli
20 January 2024	Adelaide	Australia	Hindley Street Music Hall
22 January 2024	Perth	Australia	The Rechabite
