= Elusive =

Single by Scott Matthews

from the album Passing Stranger
- Released: 13 March 2006 (UK)
- Recorded: 2006
- Genre: Folk rock
- Length: 3:42
- Label: San Remo Records; Island Records
- Songwriter(s): Scott Matthews

Scott Matthews singles chronology
"Elusive" (2006)	"Dream Song" (2006)

"Elusive" was the first single for British singer-songwriter Scott Matthews and was released on 18 September 2006. The single received much airplay from BBC Radio DJs Jo Whiley, Dermot O'Leary and Zane Lowe between 7 and 10 August. Lowe also played "Elusive" once each night as his chosen Single of the Week. Matthews also visited the station to perform "Elusive" and other songs from the album in May and August 2006. In May 2007, he won the Ivor Novello Award for "Best Song Musically and Lyrically" which saw "Elusive" beat strong competition from the likes of the Arctic Monkeys.

The track was used in 2008 by UK television company Channel 4 for the advertising campaign surrounding the final season of The Sopranos, which aired exclusively on their digital channel E4.

"Elusive" was covered by Lianne La Havas on her 2012 debut LP Is Your Love Big Enough?.
