= What You Don't Do =

Single by Lianne La Havas

from the album Blood
- Released: 7 August 2015
- Recorded: 2015
- Genre: R&B; jazz; doo-wop
- Length: 3:41
- Label: Warner Bros.
- Songwriter(s): Matt Hales; Sam Dew
- Producer(s): Matt Hales

Lianne La Havas singles chronology
""Unstoppable"" (2015)	"What You Don't Do" (2015)	"Green & Gold" (2015)

Music video
- "What You Don't Do" on YouTube

"What You Don't Do" is a single by British recording artist Lianne La Havas. Released as the album's second single on 7 August 2015, the song peaked at number 69 on the Ultratip Belgium Flanders charts.

== Background and composition ==
Following the touring La Havas embarked in promotion of her debut album Is Your Love Big Enough?, she traveled to Jamaica along with her mother in order to regain connections with her roots. During her time in Jamaica La Havas played music for her family alongside dancehall and reggae producer Stephen McGregor (known under his production name Di Genius), who would later go on to produce the majority of the songs on Blood. Besides Stephen McGregor, La Havas worked with a variety of other producers, including Matt Hales.

The song is a R&B, jazz, and doo-wop tune that grows slowly, and pinpoints the voice of the singer. The arrangement of the song takes a backseat, while the production has a "canned sound for the verses", before starting the choruses. Horns, gospel-choir style supporting vocals, piano and brass complete the composition. The song features truthfulness and wit proclaiming her confidence in her relationship, turning the negative phrase "What You Don't Do" into a positive slogan talking about games that the vocalist is not "forced to endure".

== Charts ==
Chart (2015)	Peak position
Belgium (Ultratip Bubbling Under Flanders)	69
US Adult R&B Songs (Billboard)	29
