= Unstoppable (Lianne La Havas song) =

Single by Lianne La Havas

from the album Blood
- Released: 21 April 2015
- Genre: Jazz-pop
- Length: 5:29
- Label: Warner Bros
- Songwriters: Lianne La Havas; Paul Epworth
- Producer: Paul Epworth

Lianne La Havas singles chronology
"Age" (2012)	"Unstoppable" (2015)	"What You Don't Do" (2015)

Music video
- "Unstoppable" on YouTube

"Unstoppable" is a song by English singer Lianne La Havas from her second studio album Blood (2015). The song was released as the album's official lead single and made available to stream on 21 April 2015, followed by a digital download release on 1 June 2015. Written by La Havas and Paul Epworth, with the latter handling the song's production, "Unstoppable" is a jazz-pop song that features strings, piano, and a subtle electric guitar, with lyrics that speak about the heights of love.

== Background and composition ==
"Unstoppable" was produced by Paul Epworth and built upon an instrumental recording by Ninja Tune-signed trio The Invisible. It was written in order to help La Havas repair a relationship that she had previously ended. "Unstoppable" was released as the album's lead single, and made available to stream on 21 April 2015, followed by a digital download release on 1 June in the United Kingdom.

"Unstoppable" is a jazz-pop song that opens with breezy chimes and is built over gentle bass riffing, strings, piano, and a subtle electric guitar. The song features an easy-going instrumentals, that features uplifting lyrics. Caitlin White of the publication Stereogum described the song's production as "sweeping" accompanied by "flickers of rich, velvety rhythm guitar," White continued to note the song's lyrical content as glorifying the "kind of relationship that spurs both parties to unspeakable heights."

== Track listings ==
7-inch single

1. "Unstoppable" – 5:29
2. "Unstoppable" (FKJ Remix) – 5:16

Digital single (Radio Edit)

1. "Unstoppable" (Radio Edit) – 3:51

Digital single (Jungle's Edit)

1. "Unstoppable" (Jungle's Edit) – 3:35

Digital single (FKJ Remix)

1. "Unstoppable" (FKJ Remix) – 5:16

== Charts ==
Chart (2015)	Peak position
Belgium (Ultratip Flanders)	83
France (SNEP)	89
Russia (Tophit)	309
UK Physical Singles (OCC)	20
UK Vinyl Singles (OCC)	13
