= Elsewhere (Scott Matthews album) =

Studio album by Scott Matthews
- Released: 25 May 2009
- Recorded: Magic Garden Music, Wolverhampton, England
- Genre: Folk rock, indie folk, blues
- Length: 56:57
- Label: Island

Scott Matthews chronology
Passing Stranger (2006)	Elsewhere (2009)	What The Night Delivers (2011)

Professional ratings
Review scores
Source	Rating
musicOMH	3/5 stars
Sputnikmusic	3/5

Elsewhere is the second studio album of British singer/songwriter Scott Matthews, released on 25 May 2009, more than three years after his debut album Passing Stranger. The album was released on Island after the label signed Matthews when re-issuing his debut. The album contains the single "Fractured", with the video available with the iTunes download of the album.

== Track listing ==
1. "Underlying Lies" – 5:26
2. "Jagged Melody" – 4:15
3. "Suddenly You Figure Out" – 4:48
4. "Fractured" – 4:03
5. "12 Harps" – 5:01
6. "Speeding Slowly" – 4:02
7. "Into The Firing Line" – 3:42
8. "Up On The Hill" – 5:35
9. "Elsewhere" – 5:02
10. "Fades In Vain" – 7:03
11. "Nothing's Quite Right Here" – 3:24

Bonus tracks (iTunes download)

1. "Is This Love" - 4:41

== Personnel ==
- Scott Matthews - vocals, guitars, bass, ebow guitar, mandolin, autoharp, ebow bass, hammond organ.
- Sam Martin - drums, percussion.
- Craig Johnson - bass guitar
- Danny Keane - cello
- Darren Matthews - piano
- Mat Taylor - flute
- Robert Plant - vocals
- Gavin Monaghan - theremin and analogue synthesizer
- Ray Butcher - trumpet
- Richard Shrewsbury - trombone
- Mark Davis - tuba
- Nick Benz - French horn
- Madeleine Easton - violin
- Lizzie Ball - violin
- Oli Langford - viola
- Produced and Mixed by Gavin Monaghan and Scott Matthews
- Engineered by Gavin Monaghan and Gareth Rogers
- "Fractured" mixed by Tom Lord Alge
- "Into the Firing line" mixed by Cenzo Townsend
