= Is Your Love Big Enough? =

Studio album by Lianne La Havas
- Released: July 6, 2012
- Genre: Alternative, folk, soul
- Length: 45:31
- Label: Warner Bros., Nonesuch
- Producer: Matt Hales

Lianne La Havas chronology
Is Your Love Big Enough? (2012)	Blood (2015)

Singles from Is Your Love Big Enough?
- 1. "No Room for Doubt" Released: October 21, 2011; 2. "Forget" Released: December 30, 2011; 3. "Lost & Found" Released: April 27, 2012; 4. "Is Your Love Big Enough?" Released: May 22, 2012; 5. "Age" Released: December 3, 2012

Is Your Love Big Enough? is the debut studio album by English singer-songwriter Lianne La Havas. It was released in the United Kingdom on July 9, 2012, through Warner Bros. The album peaked at number 4 on the UK Albums Chart.

The album was nominated for the 2012 Mercury Prize and 2013 Ivor Novello Awards.

== Background ==
Whilst attending sixth-form in Croydon, a friend of La Havas', the singer and songwriter Allan Rose (who had attended the Brit School), introduced her to other musicians who would assist La Havas in the recording of her first demos. Through that same friend La Havas was also introduced to British singer Paloma Faith; she later sang backing vocals on tour for Faith. La Havas was co-writer and performer in The Paris Parade alongside Christian Pinchbeck (who designed the artwork for Lost & Found and is also now part of the duo Memphis Industries duo Elephant); their short-lived career would kick off La Havas' career in commercial music. In 2010, Lianne signed to Warner Bros. Records, spending two years developing her songwriting skills before releasing any music publicly.

Her first EP Lost & Found was released on October 21, 2011, on the Labour of Love label, featuring Willy Mason on the opening track "No Room For Doubt". That same month, La Havas released the live EP Live From LA, which was made available for free download on her website. La Havas made her television debut on October 21, 2011, broadcast of BBC Two's Later… with Jools Holland, a programme that also featured Wisconsin folk band Bon Iver; soon after this on October 25, 2011, it was announced that La Havas would be the supporting act for Bon Iver's December 2011 North American tour.

== Release and promotion ==
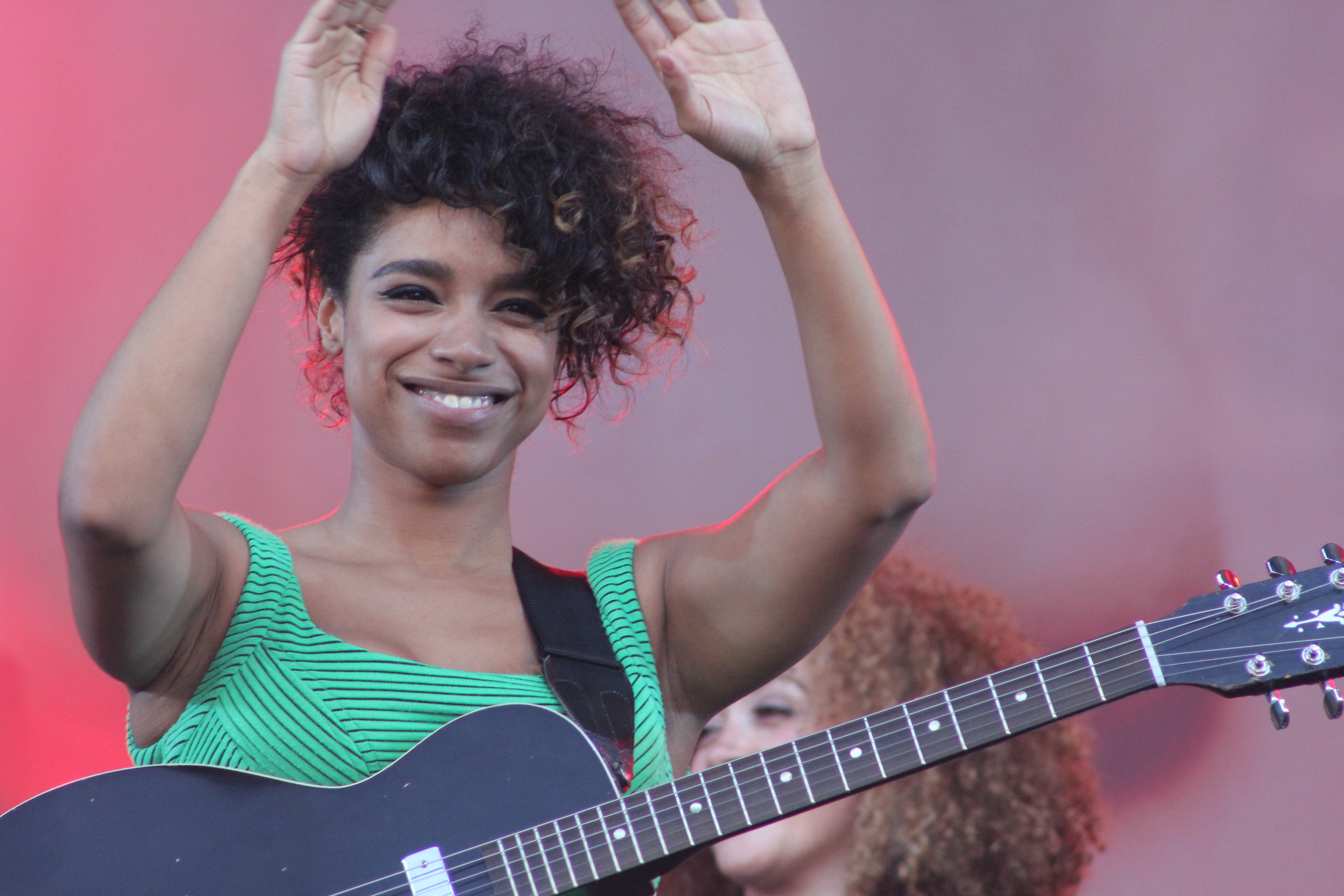
Festival La Voix Du Rock, Tourcoing, 2013 (Photo: Bellenger)

Her official debut single "Lost & Found" was released in the UK on April 30, 2012, and her debut album, was released on July 9, 2012, on Warner Brothers. "Forget" was released as the second single from the album on December 30, 2011. "Lost & Found" was released as the third single from the album on April 27, 2012. "Is Your Love Big Enough?" was released as the fourth single from the album on May 22, 2012. The song was heavily contributed to the 2014 documentary film The Distortion of Sound, which features Lianne and her live performance of the single. "Age" was released as the fifth single from the album on December 3, 2012.

At the end of 2012, Is Your Love Big Enough? was named iTunes Album of the Year. On September 24, 2012, September La Havas supported Alicia Keys at MTV 'Crashes' Manchester, a live performance in front of 1,000 people in Manchester Cathedral, which was broadcast in 164 countries. On December 31, 2012, she appeared on BBC Two's New Year's Eve show Jools' Annual Hootenanny singing Cow Cow Boogie. On June 9, 2013, La Havas played at the RockNess music festival in Inverness, Scotland, and on June 30, 2013, La Havas performed at the Glastonbury Festival 2013. La Havas also performed at the Isle of Wight Festival in June 2013.

== Critical reception ==
Professional ratings
Review scores
Source	Rating
Consequence of Sound	3.5/5 stars
Rolling Stone	3.5/5 stars
The Guardian	3/5 stars
The Telegraph	4/5 stars
NME	5/10 stars
Digital Spy	4/5 stars

At Metacritic, which assigns a normalized rating out of 100 to reviews from mainstream critics, the album received an average score of 75, based on 15 reviews, which indicates "Generally favorable reviews". Gaffa listed Is Your Love Big Enough? the 30th best album of 2012 by a non-Danish artist.

== Track listing ==
No.	Title	Writer(s)	Producer(s)	Length
1.	"Don't Wake Me Up"	Lianne La Havas	Matt Hales	3:43
2.	"Is Your Love Big Enough?"	La Havas, Hales, Willy Mason	Hales	3:22
3.	"Lost & Found"	La Havas, Hales	Hales	4:28
4.	"Au cinéma"	La Havas, Hales	Hales	4:18
5.	"No Room for Doubt" (featuring Willy Mason)	La Havas, Mason, Hales	Hales	4:05
6.	"Forget"	La Havas	Hales	3:52
7.	"Age"	La Havas, Hales	Hales	2:43
8.	"Elusive"	Scott Matthews	Hales	3:56
9.	"Everything Everything"	La Havas, Hales	Hales	3:50
10.	"Gone"	La Havas, Hales	Hales	4:25
11.	"Tease Me"	La Havas	Matt Ingram, Dan Cox, Hales	3:37
12.	"They Could Be Wrong"	La Havas, Hales	Hales	3:21
Total length:				45:31

Deluxe edition bonus tracks
No.	Title	Length
13.	"Forget" (Live)	3:55
14.	"Lost & Found" (Live)	4:32
15.	"No Room for Doubt" (Live)	3:58
16.	"Don't Wake Me Up" (Live)	4:06
Total length:		61:59

iTunes deluxe edition bonus tracks
No.	Title	Length
13.	"Hey, That's No Way to Say Goodbye" (Piano by Chilly Gonzales in Paris)	3:03
14.	"Arms of Danger" (Solo in Paris)	3:27
15.	"Empty" (Solo in Paris)	3:13
16.	"He Loves Me" (Solo in Paris)	3:30
17.	"Forget" (Solo in Paris)	4:01

Limited edition bonus vinyl
No.	Title	Writer(s)	Producer(s)	Length
1.	"No Room for Doubt" (Solo version)	Lianne La Havas	Matt Hales
2.	"Tongue Tied"

iTunes Festival Edition
No.	Title	Length
13.	"They Could Be Wrong" (Live) (video)	3:50
14.	"Au cinéma" (Live) (video)	4:17
15.	"Don't Wake Me Up" (Live) (video)	4:06

- The enhanced CD gives access to videos of an exclusive track-by-track interview.
- All writing and production credits have been taken from Is Your Love Big Enough? booklet.

== Release formats ==
Is Your Love Big Enough? (Standard edition)

- Standard 12 tracks

Is Your Love Big Enough? (Deluxe edition)

- Standard 12 tracks
- Bonus 4 live tracks
- 2 posters
- 12-page booklet
- 3-panel softpack case

Is Your Love Big Enough? (Limited vinyl edition)

- MP3 download
- Standard 12 tracks
- Bonus 7" vinyl featuring two bonus tracks
- Two exclusive 12" artcard prints

Is Your Love Big Enough? (iTunes Festival)

- Standard 12 tracks
- 3 bonus videos, live from the iTunes Festival 2012

== Charts ==
Chart (2012)	Peak position
Belgian Albums Chart (Flanders)	30
Belgian Albums Chart (Wallonia)	66
Dutch Albums Chart	3
French Albums Chart	96
German Albums Chart	30
Irish Album Chart	21
Scottish Albums (OCC)	14
Swiss Albums Chart	32
UK Albums Chart	4
US Billboard 200	142
US Americana/Folk Albums (Billboard)	7
US Heatseekers Albums (Billboard)	1
US Top Rock Albums (Billboard)	42

== Certifications ==
Region	Certification	Certified units/sales
United Kingdom (BPI)	Gold	100,000^{‡}
^{‡} Sales+streaming figures based on certification alone.

== Release history ==
Regions	Dates	Format(s)	Label(s)	Edition(s)
Ireland	July 6, 2012	CD, digital download, LP	Warner Bros.	Standard, deluxe, limited
United Kingdom	July 9, 2012	CD, digital download, LP	Warner Bros.	Standard, deluxe, limited
Belgium	July 13, 2012	CD, digital download, LP	Warner Bros.	Standard, deluxe, limited
France	July 13, 2012	CD, digital download, LP	Warner Bros.	Standard, deluxe, limited
Netherlands	July 13, 2012	CD, digital download, LP	Warner Bros.	Standard, deluxe, limited
France	July 16, 2012	CD, digital download, LP	Warner Bros.	Standard, deluxe, limited
United States	August 7, 2012	CD, digital download, LP	Warner Bros.	Standard, deluxe, limited
United Kingdom	December 10, 2012	Digital download	Warner Bros.	iTunes Festival
