= Passing Stranger =

Studio album by Scott Matthews
- Released: 13 March 2006
- Studio: Artisan, Birmingham, England
- Genre: Folk rock, indie folk, blues
- Length: 50'18"
- Label: San Remo, Island
- Producer: Jon Cotton

Scott Matthews chronology
Passing Stranger (2006)	Elsewhere (2009)

Professional ratings
Review scores
Source	Rating
AllMusic	4/5 stars
BBC	(favourable)
PopMatters	4/10 stars

Passing Stranger is the debut album of British singer-songwriter Scott Matthews, originally released in March 2006, before being re-issued by Island Records in October of the same year. The album contains the singles "Elusive", "Dream Song" and "Passing Stranger". After Scott won the Ivor Novello Award for 'Best Song Lyrically and Musically' for "Elusive", a deluxe edition of the album was re-released, and was made available on 25 June 2007.

The album features ten full-length songs and seven short instrumental or minimal pieces.

== Track listing ==
All songs written by Scott Matthews.

1. "Little Man Tabla Jam Pt.1" – 0:40
2. "Dream Song" – 4:42
3. "The Fool's Fooling Himself" – 4:01
4. "Eyes Wider Than Before" – 3:36
5. "Blue In The Face Again" – 1:11
6. "Sweet Scented Figure" – 4:31
7. "Passing Stranger" – 4:32
8. "Prayers" – 3:15
9. "Musical Interval" – 1:11
10. "Still Fooling" – 0:21
11. "City Headache" – 4:59
12. "Nylon Instrumental" – 0:19
13. "Elusive" – 3:42
14. "Earth To Calm" – 4:17
15. "White Feathered Medicine" – 5:45
16. "Little Man Tabla Jam Pt. 2" – 0:34
17. "Bruno Finale" – 2:19

A deluxe two-disc edition was released in 2007 containing new recordings (on disc 2), produced by John Leckie and featuring a string quartet:

1. "Dream Song" – 4:37
2. "Eyes Wider Than Before" – 4:00
3. "Elusive" – 3:43
4. "City Headache" – 4:47
5. "The Fool's Fooling Himself" – 3:59

== Personnel ==
- Scott Matthews – vocals, guitars, bass guitar, percussion, harmonica
- Jon Cotton – Rhodes, piano, Wurlitzer, vibraphone, sound engineer, record producer
- Matt Thomas – drums, percussion
- Sukhvinder Singh Namdhari – tabla
- Mat Taylor – saxophone, flute, clarinet
- Richard Adey – accordion
- Caroline Bodimead – violin
- Charlote Miles – violin
- Nina Kopparhead – viola
- Elizabeth Garside – cello
- Bruno Cavellec – voice-over
