= Blood (Lianne La Havas album) =

Studio album by Lianne La Havas
- Released: 31 July 2015
- Recorded: 2013–2015
- Genre: Neo soul
- Length: 40:37
- Label: Warner Bros.; Nonesuch
- Producer: Mark Batson; Paul Epworth; Matt Hales; Lianne La Havas; Jamie Lidell; Stephen McGregor

Lianne La Havas chronology
Is Your Love Big Enough? (2012)	Blood (2015)	Lianne La Havas (2020)

Singles from Blood
- 1. "Unstoppable" Released: 21 April 2015; 2. "What You Don't Do" Released: 7 August 2015; 3. "Green & Gold" Released: 2 November 2015; 4. "Midnight" Released: 7 August 2016; 5. "Tokyo" Released: 7 August 2016

Blood is the second studio album by English singer Lianne La Havas. It was released on 31 July 2015 by Warner Bros. Records. Following the release of her critically acclaimed debut Is Your Love Big Enough? (2012), La Havas embarked on a variety of tours and festivals before traveling to Jamaica. During La Havas' time in Jamaica, she attempted to regain a connection with her roots; the exploration inspired La Havas to begin writing the follow-up to her debut. During her stay in Jamaica, La Havas met with reggae producer Stephen McGregor, who would subsequently go on to help produce the album.

As well as working with McGregor, La Havas reunited with past collaborator Matt Hales. La Havas co-wrote each of the album's songs and was credited as a co-producer on one. Havas cited the album as an homage towards her Jamaican and Greek bloodline, which in turn inspired the album's title. Blood was seen as a departure from the acoustic musical leanings of her debut Is Your Love Big Enough? (2012), taking on a neo soul and jazz style, with elements of R&B, doo-wop, reggae and gospel music. The album's songs were characterised as having heavy basses with electronic flourishes and lyrics focusing on love, relationships, and identity.

Upon release Blood was met with positive reviews from music critics, who praised the musical transition and its overall progression from La Havas' debut album. Commercially the album was successful, peaking at number two in the United Kingdom and number one in the Netherlands and Norway as well as making appearances on other charts. In order to promote the album La Havas ventured on numerous tours and supported Blood with the release of two singles—"Unstoppable" and "What You Don't Do"—both of which fared moderately. It received a nomination for Best Urban Contemporary Album at the 2016 Grammy Awards.

== Background ==
Following La Havas' signing to Warner Bros. Records in 2010, she spent the following two years developing her songwriting skills before releasing any music publicly. Her official debut single "Lost & Found" was released in the UK on 30 April 2012, and her debut album, Is Your Love Big Enough? was released on 9 July 2012 on Warner Bros. The album was released to universal acclaim from music critics, later winning the Album of the Year at iTunes UK as well as receiving nominations for a Barclaycard Mercury Prize and Ivor Novello Best Album. Following the release of the album La Havas supported it with numerous tour dates and festivals including the RockNess music festival, Glastonbury Festival 2013. and the Isle of Wight Festival in June 2013.

== Recording ==
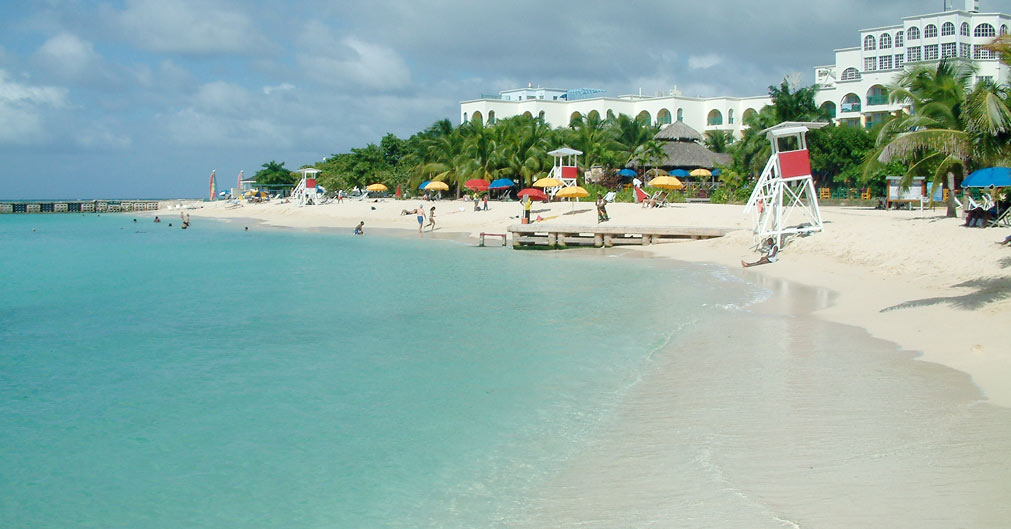
The writing and recording for "Blood" was inspired by La Havas' travels to Jamaica.

Following the touring La Havas embarked on in order to promote her debut album, she traveled to Jamaica along with her mother in order to regain a connection with her roots. During her time in Jamaica La Havas played music for her family alongside dancehall and reggae producer Stephen McGregor (known under his production name Di Genius), who would later go on to produce the majority of the songs on Blood. The exploration of La Havas' roots inspired her to begin writing; she stated that the album's writing process and the songs were all related to "the feeling of who you are and where you come from", whilst the album's music was inspired by Jamaica's love of grooves, rhythms, and syncopation.

During the album's recording process La Havas, took inspiration from her mixed Greek and Jamaican heritage and the "clarity" she discovered when revisiting her youth. Besides Stephen McGregor, La Havas worked with a variety of other producers; the album's lead single "Unstoppable" was produced by Paul Epworth and built upon an instrumental recording by Ninja Tune-signed trio The Invisible, and was written in order to help La Havas repair a relationship that she had previously ended. As well as Epworth, Blood featured production work from Mark Batson, while Aqualung's Matt Hales co-wrote the song "Wonderful" with La Havas and Disclosure's Howard Lawrence. '

"Green & Gold" was co-produced and co-written by Jamie Lidell. The song was also co-produced by La Havas herself and was described by her as being completely literal and true. During the recording of "Midnight" Havas stated that she was able to perform a style of singing that she did not think she could do. The song was written in Jamaica, something La Havas said was necessary because she would not have been able to create the lyrics if she was anywhere else.

== Music and lyrics ==
Her songs remain smooth, teetering on the fringes of jazz, only this time, as well as gloss, there is defiance – a leap from the sweet acoustic stories of her 2012 debut, Is Your Love Big Enough?. There are moments on Blood that recall the artistry and ambition of Jill Scott or Lauryn Hill, comparisons that have led to La Havas being described as a neo or nu-soul artist.

— Harriet Gibsone, The Guardian

Blood was seen as departure from the acoustic sound of her debut Is Your Love Big Enough? (2012), taking on a neo soul style that was compared to the work of Lauryn Hill and Jill Scott. Blood was described as a seamless album, one where the songs flow into one another with fluidity and serenity. The album takes numerous influences from musical genres including pop, reggae and old-school jazz whilst its production has been characterised as containing light chimes and heavy brass. According to Sasha Geffen, the album's production leans towards "upbeat, clever production" that contains flourishes; the songs are built over reversed drums, bold instrumentation, muted guitar fingerpicking, electronic outlier, organic sounds, classical guitars, and twisting electric sounds.

Lyrically Blood primarily focuses on love, relationships and identity; La Havas's lyrics were also described as being expressive and combusting. Blood also lyrically speaks about La Havas' roots and speaks of her secondhand culture, nostalgia and the longing for something she had never really experienced. Reviewer Sasha Geffen believed that the album's lyrical content and themes reflect on what it means for La Havas to come into her own as an adult and an artist, with other lyrics revolving around loneliness and "belonging to a sense of unbelonging, coming away with a clearer image of who she is by parsing out who she's not."

== Songs ==
The album opens with "Unstoppable", a jazz and pop song that opens with breezy chimes and is built over gentle bass riffing, strings, piano, and a subtle electric guitar. The song features an easy-going instrumental as well as uplifting lyrics. Caitlin White of the publication Stereogum described the song's production as "sweeping", accompanied by "flickers of rich, velvety rhythm guitar". White continued to note the song's lyrical content as glorifying the "kind of relationship that spurs both parties to unspeakable heights". "Green & Gold" is a jazz-infused song that is built over a cascading guitar, finger-snapping rhythm and summery keyboards and horns. Lyrically "Green & Gold" sees La Havas recalling a childhood identity crisis, examining her features in the looking glass and coming up with answers relating to the colours of her mother's Jamaican flag, her Greek father and her London upbringing.

"What You Don't Do" is an R&B song with elements of doo-wop and jazz that builds gradually, and focuses on La Havas' voice. The song's arrangements take a backseat, whilst the song's production is described as having a "canned sound for the verses", before picking up on the choruses. The track features horns, gospel-choir style backing vocals, a jittering piano and bursts of brass. Lyrically the song features wit and honesty, with La Havas declaring her security in her relationship. It relies on turning the negative phrase "What You Don't Do" into a positive message, talking about the games La Havas is not "forced to endure" during her relationship. "Tokyo" contains a slow groove built over a hazy effect, lyrically the song sees La Havas yearning and in state of disorientation. La Havas wrote "Tokyo" based on the feeling of loneliness and moving from one place to another. The song was titled after the city of Tokyo due to it being a bustling city, but La Havas stated that "you can feel so alone there". The song also drew some inspiration from the movie Lost in Translation, which La Havas used as inspiration when writing the song.

"Wonderful" has a sleepy production that is similar to a lullaby. The song is a slow tempo track built over finger snaps, prickles of string, and drums subtly played in reverse with lyrics involving themes of sadness. "Midnight" is an upbeat neo soul song that features brassy accents. "Midnight" was written in Jamaica and was inspired by La Havas' Greek and Jamaican heritage. La Havas stated that lyrically the song represents a "newfound confidence" in who she is as an artist, her heritage, and her musical style. "Grow" is a reggae-derived song that features the use of an acoustic guitar. Lyrically it sees La Havas attempting to resist evil, followed by a climatic chorus that hears Havas using the height of her vocal range. According to Havas, "Grow" was inspired by personal growth;

I wanted it to be hopeful. I wanted it to be joyous, I guess. I seemed to feel better as I did each part of this album. I was using music to discover what I liked. Womanhood, feeling like an adult, but not being quite mature yet – I wanted to celebrate that.

== Release and promotion ==
Blood was released on 31 July 2015 through Warner Bros. Records. The album was distributed in six release formats including two 12-inch vinyl records, one of which included an exclusive signing; the CD, which was released as a standard version and an exclusively signed version; and the digital download, which was released in a standard format and an iTunes mastered format. The album was titled Blood due to La Havas gravitating towards the word when songwriting. La Havas also stated that the album was titled Blood because it was at the heart of the album due to her inspiration from her heritage and her family's Jamaican and Greek bloodline.

Prior to the album's release La Havas previewed tracks from Blood at various intimate shows, starting in Brigton Komedia on 18 May, followed by London's Wilton's Music Hall on 19 May, and then dates in Amsterdam and Berlin later in that month, before going on to tour festivals. The album's lead single "Unstoppable" was made available to stream on 21 April 2015 and was released for digital download on 1 June in the United Kingdom. "What You Don't Do" was released as the album's second single along with a music video, and was sent for digital release on 7 August 2015.

La Havas promoted the album further throughout the summer of 2015 with appearances in Swansea and Manchester as a special guest to Paolo Nutini. Her summer festival appearances commenced with a Glastonbury set followed by appearances at How the Light Gets In, Latitude, Gentlemen of the Road, curated by Mumford and Sons, and Bestival. La Havas later announced she would be embarking on a month-long North American tour beginning 23 September 2015 with stops in Washington, DC; Chicago; Boston; San Francisco; and Austin, among others. The tour followed previously announced performances at the Essence Festival in New Orleans and a sold-out pair of intimate evenings at the Troubadour in Los Angeles and Bowery Ballroom in New York in July. Tickets for the fall shows went on sale on 26 June, and included a digital download of Blood in its entirety using a code sent by email. Additionally, a limited amount of VIP packages that included a ticket to the show, custom merchandise items, and priority entry at participating venues were made available.

Following her performance at Glastonbury and the announcement of her North American tour, La Havas confirmed she would embark on a tour across Ireland and the United Kingdom. The tour took place during December 2015 and visited Dublin, Olympia Theatre; Birmingham, The Institute; Bournemouth, O2 Academy; Cambridge, Corn Exchange; Bristol, O2 Academy; Glasgow, O2 Academy; Manchester, Albert Hall; Leeds, O2 Academy; and Brixton, O2 Academy.

== Critical reception ==
Professional ratings
Aggregate scores
Source	Rating
Metacritic	72/100
Review scores
Source	Rating
AllMusic	4/5 stars
DIY	4/5 stars
The Guardian	3/5 stars
The Guardian (Charlottetown)	3.5/5 stars
Inyourspeakers Media	80/100
Pitchfork	7.7/10
Rolling Stone	3.5/5 stars

Upon its release, Blood received generally positive reviews from most music critics. At Metacritic, which assigns a weighted mean rating out of 100 to reviews from music critics, the album received an aggregate score of 72 from Metacritic. Tshepo Mokoena of The Guardian gave the album three out of five stars and praised La Havas' vocals, stating that it makes "for addictive listening". Rolling Stone's Joe Levy gave the album three-and-a-half stars, describing La Havas' new musical direction as "bass, and plenty of it" and the songs "Unstoppable" and "What You Don't Do" as its standouts. Entertainment Weekly's Jessica Goodman gave it a B+ rating and complimented La Havas' vocals and her ability to take bigger risks musically.

AllMusic's Andy Kellman gave it four out of five stars and called it "impressive", continuing to state that Blood leaves Havas' debut in the "dust". In a mixed review by the Chicago Tribune's Greg Kot, he described the album's content as "bloodiness" and claimed that La Havas' vocals do not make an impact as an "emotional imperative". The Star's Chester Chin meanwhile, said the album showcases La Havas' ability as "a masterful vocalist capable of both sophistication and soul".

== Commercial performance ==
Blood was a commercial success, debuting at number two on the UK Albums Chart, missing out on the top spot by 1,300 copies. Five singles were released from the album, including "Unstoppable" on 21 April 2015, and "What You Don't Do" on 7 August. "Unstoppable" performed poorly, only making an appearance on the Belgium Flanders Ultratip chart. The second single "What You Don't Do" experienced more success than its predecessor, peaking at number fifty-four on the Flanders Ultratip chart and peaking at number twenty-nine on the US Billboard Adult R&B Songs chart.

== Track listing ==
No.	Title	Writer(s)	Producer(s)	Length
1.	"Unstoppable"	Lianne La Havas; Paul Epworth	Epworth	5:29
2.	"Green & Gold"	La Havas; Jamie Lidell; Matt Hales	La Havas; Lidell; Hales^{[a]}	4:38
3.	"What You Don't Do"	Hales; Sam Dew	Hales; Al Shux^{[a]}	3:41
4.	"Tokyo"	La Havas; Hales	Hales	4:29
5.	"Wonderful"	La Havas; Hales; Howard Lawrence	Hales	4:16
6.	"Midnight"	La Havas; Stephen McGregor; Shea Taylor; Dew	Di Genius	3:30
7.	"Grow"	La Havas; Mark Batson	Batson	3:39
8.	"Ghost"	La Havas; Hales	Hales	3:44
9.	"Never Get Enough"	La Havas; Batson	Batson	3:22
10.	"Good Goodbye"	La Havas; Hales	Hales	3:49
Total length:				40:37

Notes

- ^{^[a]} signifies an additional producer
- Credits adapted from Blood liner notes

=== Blood (Solo) ===
Blood (Solo) is an EP by Lianne La Havas, released on 12 February 2016. The EP includes stripped-down versions of songs previously released on Blood, and also includes a new song, "Fairytale". In some countries, a reissued version of the album was released with the Solo tracks added to the original track listing.

Blood Solo – EP
No.	Title	Writer(s)	Producer(s)	Length
1.	"Unstoppable" (Solo)	La Havas; Epworth	Epworth	4:29
2.	"Fairytale" (Solo)	La Havas		4:41
3.	"Green & Gold" (Solo)	La Havas; Lidel; Hales	La Havas; Lidell; Hales^{[a]}	3:54
4.	"Wonderful" (Solo)	La Havas; Hales; Lawrence	Hales	4:21
5.	"Grow" (Solo)	La Havas; Batson	Batson	3:53
6.	"Green & Gold (Interlude)" (Solo)	La Havas; Lidel; Hales	La Havas; Lidell; Hales^{[a]}	0:32
7.	"Midnight" (Solo)	La Havas; McGregor; Taylor; Dew	McGregor	3:29

Notes

- ^{^[a]} signifies an additional producer

== Formats ==
Release formats adapted from La Havas official websites.

- Blood standard CD
- Blood standard CD exclusively signed
- Blood limited CD soft pack
- Blood standard 12" vinyl
- Blood standard 12" vinyl exclusively signed
- Blood standard digital download
- Blood mastered for iTunes

== Charts ==
=== Weekly charts ===
Chart (2015)	Peak position
Australian Albums (ARIA)	30
Austrian Albums (Ö3 Austria)	32
Belgian Albums (Ultratop Flanders)	10
Belgian Albums (Ultratop Wallonia)	39
Dutch Albums (Album Top 100)	1
French Albums (SNEP)	24
German Albums (Offizielle Top 100)	37
Irish Albums (IRMA)	24
Scottish Albums (OCC)	3
Swiss Albums (Schweizer Hitparade)	14
UK Albums (OCC)	2
US Billboard 200	52
US Top Alternative Albums (Billboard)	5
US Top R&B Albums (Billboard)	4
US Top R&B/Hip-Hop Albums (Billboard)	8

=== Year-end charts ===
Chart (2015)	Position
Belgian Albums (Ultratop Flanders)	198
Dutch Albums (Album Top 100)	93

Chart (2016)	Position
Belgian Albums (Ultratop Flanders)	121

== Certifications ==
Region	Certification	Certified units/sales
United Kingdom (BPI)	Silver	60,000^{‡}
^{‡} Sales+streaming figures based on certification alone.

== Release history ==
Region	Date	Format	Edition	Label	Ref.
United Kingdom	31 July 2015	CD; LP; digital download	Standard; deluxe	Warner Bros.	
United States	31 July 2015	Digital download	Standard; deluxe	Warner Bros.	
