= Scott Matthews =

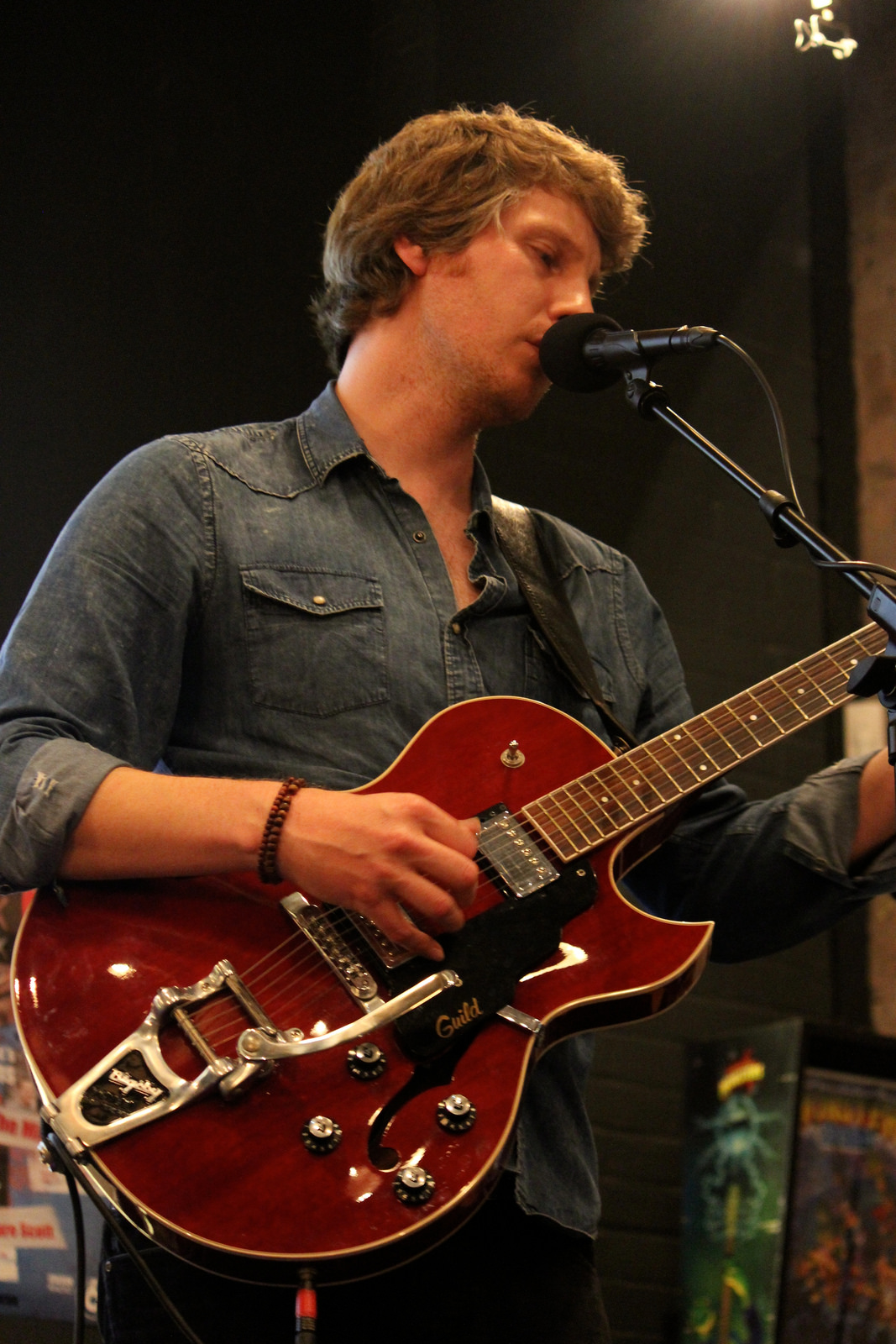
- Musician Scott Matthews performing at Dockyard Bar in Salford on 25 September 2014.

Background information
- Born: 15 January 1976 (age 50); Wolverhampton, England
- Genres: Folk rock; indie folk; blues
- Occupations: Singer-songwriter; guitarist
- Instruments: Vocals; guitar
- Years active: 2000s
- Labels: San Remo, Island Records, Shedio Records
- Website: scottmatthews.uk

Scott Matthews (born 15 January 1976) is an English singer-songwriter from Wolverhampton, England.

== Life and career ==
His first album Passing Stranger was released on 13 March 2006 on San Remo Records before being re-released on Island Records later in the year. Janice Long was the first of the BBC DJs to play his music. Soon, tracks from Passing Stranger were also being played by Mark Radcliffe and Bob Harris on BBC Radio 2. In April, Scott played sessions on BBC Radio 2 & BBC 6 Music.

Matthews' first single "Elusive" was released in September. In May 2007 Matthews won the Ivor Novello Award for "Best Song Musically and Lyrically" for "Elusive".

Matthews has toured the UK in support of his album and appeared in support of the Foo Fighters for their acoustic Skin and Bones concerts around the country in June 2006.

Matthews' second album Elsewhere was produced by Matthews and Gavin Monaghan and released on Island Records.

His third album, What the Night Delivers, was produced by Jon Cotton.

Home Part 1 is the fourth studio release from Matthews. What the Night Delivers features guest performances by double bassist Danny Thompson (whom Matthews met whilst performing in Joe Boyd’s stage production of Way to Blue-The Songs of Nick Drake) and regular contributing musicians, Sam Martin, Danny Keane and Scott's brother, Darren Matthews who plays piano on two tracks; "The Clearing" and "The Night is Young".

The album was followed by Home Part 2 in September 2016, released via Scott's own label Shedio Records. Tracks include "Black Country Boy", the title of which references the Black Country region of the West Midlands. The album was produced by Scott.

The album New Skin (2020) was a product of the COVID-19 lockdown, and he followed it up with Restless Lullabies in 2023.

== Discography ==
=== Albums ===
- Passing Stranger (2006) No. 45 UK Albums Chart
- Elsewhere (2009) Released 25 May 2009
- Live in London (2010) Released November 2010
- What The Night Delivers (2011) Released 5 September 2011
- Home (Part 1) (2014) Released November 2014
- Home Part 2 (2016) Released September 2016
- The Great Untold (2018) Released April 2018
- New Skin (2020) Released December 2020
- Restless Lullabies (2023)

=== Singles ===
Year	Song	UK Singles Chart	Album
2006	"Elusive"	56	Passing Stranger
2006	"Dream Song"	78	Passing Stranger
2007	"Passing Stranger"	-	Passing Stranger
2007	"iTunes Festival: London 2007 EP"	-	Passing Stranger
2015	"Mona ( Birthday Mix )"	-	-

=== Other contributions ===
- The Saturday Sessions: The Dermot O'Leary Show (2007, EMI) – "Boy With the Thorn in His Side"
