= Lianne La Havas (album) =

Studio album by Lianne La Havas
- Released: 17 July 2020
- Recorded: October 2019 – December 2019
- Genres: Folk; neo soul; jazz
- Length: 48:06
- Labels: Warner; Nonesuch
- Producers: Lianne La Havas, Matt Hales, Beni Giles, Sam Crowe, Mura Masa, Nick Hakim, Chris Tabron

Lianne La Havas chronology
Blood (2015)	Lianne La Havas (2020)

Singles from Lianne La Havas
- 1. "Bittersweet" Released: 25 February 2020; 2. "Paper Thin" Released: 4 May 2020

Lianne La Havas is the third studio album by English singer Lianne La Havas. The album was released on 17 July 2020. Released after a five-year hiatus and La Havas' break-up with a partner, the album was inspired by the life cycle of nature and its ability to thrive, go away, and come back stronger. Recording of the album took place between October 2019 and December 2019, with sessions taking place in London, Bath and New York. The album's production was handled by La Havas along with long-term collaborator Matt Hales, co-producers Beni Giles, Sam Crowe and guest co-producer Mura Masa.

Lianne La Havas is a concept album with a song cycle that depicts the stages of a relationship, from early romance to demise. The album's musical style was inspired by Milton Nascimento, Joni Mitchell, Jaco Pastorius, Al Green, and Destiny's Child, resulting in a predominately neo soul album with elements of jazz and folk. Upon release, the album was met with rave reviews from critics, who praised the album's eclectic musical style and lyrical exploration.

== Background ==
Following the release of La Havas' second studio album Blood (2015), Havas was not satisfied with the album and felt it did not express or represent her at the time. She took time off from her recording career, entering a new relationship and later dealing with the break-up, although she continued to tour in the period between albums. The relationship's demise would go on to inspire La Havas to begin work on the follow-up to Blood. La Havas wanted a greater artistic input for the album and wanted to be in control of the album's style and direction. La Havas did not know what direction the album would initially take and "tapped into the best and worst parts" to help inform it. She described the album's process as being "driven by emotion" and at the time being the closest she had gotten to "pure" artistic expression.

The album's process took La Havas five years, something she had not planned for, stating "to make a complete piece of work that meant something that had a story just took a little bit of time". The album's theme was inspired by the life cycle of nature and plants. La Havas wanted the album to follow the journey of a seasonal flower, one that "blooms, thrives, goes away, and comes back even stronger. A flower has to dry up and die in order to be reborn. You have to get to the rock bottom to rebuild yourself." The relationship and its break-up became the main theme of the album's lyrical content, which follows a journey of three vignettes. The first describes the early and joyous period a new relationship, the second focuses on the demise of the relationship whilst the third revolves around the enjoyment and loneliness of being independent.

== Writing and recording ==
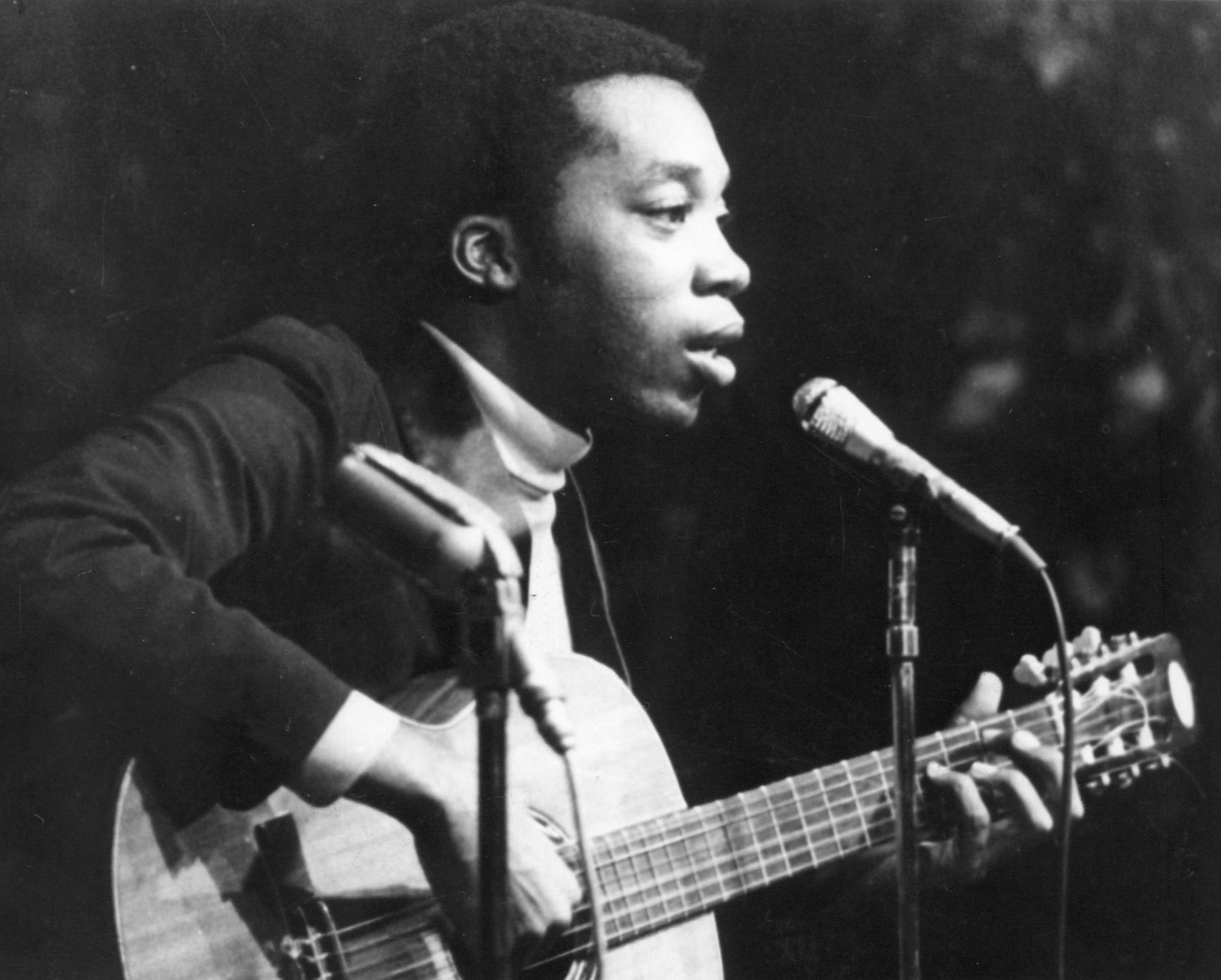
Milton Nascimento was one of numerous artists to inspire La Havas during the album's writing process.

The album was written after La Havas' breakup from her partner, with La Havas stating, "I can't write when I'm in the thick of it. I think I've got to calm down a little bit." The album's writing sessions happened sporadically over a ten-month period. The writing sessions took place between the United Kingdom and the United States and were inspired by a variety of artists including Milton Nascimento, Joni Mitchell, Jaco Pastorius, Al Green, and Destiny's Child harmonies and themes of empowerment. Recording of the album was not initially planned. Following La Havas' performance at the Glastonbury festival in June 2019, La Havas and her band went to the studio to work on a live version of Radiohead's "Weird Fishes" from their record In Rainbows. La Havas enjoyed the session and wanted her third album to be recorded in a similar way:

I had the most wonderful, nourishing experience recording that, and that's where I decided: the rest of the album needs to be like this. It's got to be my band, and I’ve got to do it in London, whenever people have time.

By October 2019, La Havas had written all ten tracks and by December the album's recording had been completed. The recording sessions took place in London, Bath and New York. The album's production was handled by long-term collaborator Matt Hales, co-producer Beni Giles, and guest co-producer Mura Masa. "Paper Thin", started from a dream in which La Havas could hear a melody and the opening lyric. The song was later recorded at Homer Steinweiss' New York studio, the song's minimalist production inspired La Havas and informed the sound and style of the album. "Can't Fight" was inspired by R&B from La Havas' childhood. The song was created and recorded in Peckham along with producer Mura Masa. During the production of the song La Havas and Masa were listening to Vulfpeck, which inspired the song's soulful production.

== Composition ==
To call it soul music would be reductive; too many black artists have hastily been assigned the label just for the color of their skin, a restrictive tendency that La Havas herself has railed against. But without a doubt, La Havas makes soul music insofar as it originates from the soul.

— Sophia Ordaz of Slant Magazine, discussing the album's musical

The album's digital version features twelve tracks, whilst the album's physical version features ten. The album is a predominantly neo-soul album, however Sophia Ordaz of Slant Magazine states "La Havas's style remains tricky to pin down, existing somewhere in the nexus of the soulful warmth of Corinne Bailey Rae, the confessional lyricism of Amy Winehouse, and the folky melodicism of Joni Mitchell." The album adopted a more cohesive composition than its predecessors. Jenessa Williams of the NME notes that Liana La Havas is "focused around a primary nucleus of intimate vocals, nimble guitar-work and driving percussion. Where debut ‘Is Your Love Big Enough’ at times felt forcibly upbeat, these new songs are languid and spacious, roaming from song to song in a way that suits their creator's natural approach to storytelling."

The album is made up of three vignettes, with each one focusing on a particular moment during La Havas' past relationships. The album's opening song "Bittersweet" is a soul song that features piano chords and subtle guitar lines. The song does not sit within the three vignette's but was described by La Havas as an "overview" of the album's themes. From "Bittersweet" onward, the album follows the arc of a relationship headed for disaster. The first phase, infatuation, is introduced in the second song "Read My Mind". The song lyrically describes La Havas' being smitten with new love.

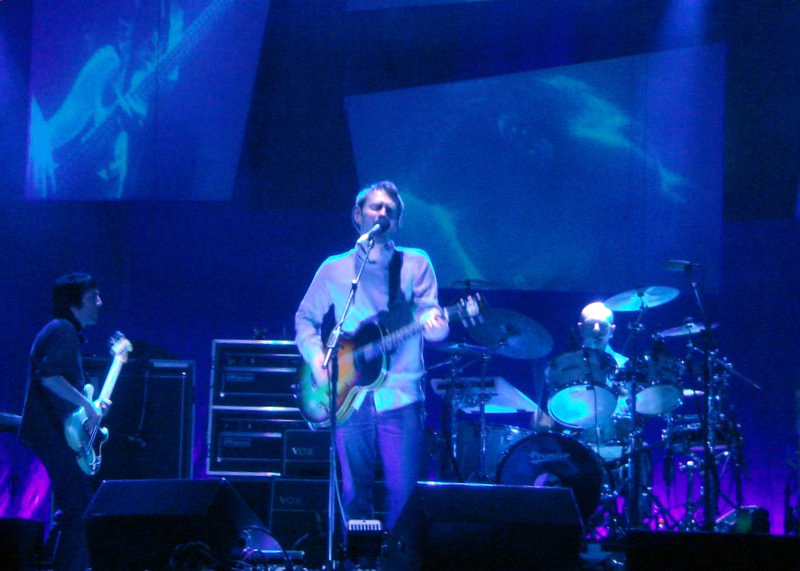
Weird Fishes is a cover of a song originally written and performed by Radiohead.

"Can't Fight" features the use of the guitar and lyrically discusses wanting something that is not right for you. Expanding on this theme, La Havas said "People say if you're having a hard time in a relationship, just leave. It's so easy to say, but it's so much more complicated than that. Because there's two of you, and neither of you are perfect. And there are things that you're learning along the way. So you think, Well, let me do a little bit of work and just see if we can get that feeling back—it's possible because we do really love each other." "Paper Thin" features a "soothing" and strumming guitar. "Weird Fishes" is a cover version originally performed by Radiohead from the album In Rainbows (2007). La Havas' version features a stripped-down production containing soulful and key-heavy tones.

"Seven Times" incorporates elements of Spanish flamenco and jazz and drew comparisons to Lauryn Hill. "Sour Flower" is a seven-minute song that features folk and art-rock influences and was noted by Michael Cragg from The Observer as "recalls Rainbows-era Radiohead".

== Release and promotion ==
The album was released on 17 July 2020, by Warner Records, La Havas' third to be released under the label. The standard edition was released on CD, vinyl, digital download and streaming. The digital version of the album contains two additional tracks; "Bittersweet" (Full Length) and "Out of Your Mind" (interlude). The vinyl version of the album was released in two formats; a standard version and an exclusive clear version.

To promote the album La Havas' did multiple live performances. In late February La Havas sang at the Barbican in London alongside the BBC Symphony Orchestra and Jules Buckley. In early May, La Havas performed from home at "NPR's "Tiny Desk (Home) Concert" series. The homemade video featured La Havas accompanied by her string guitar whilst performing "Bittersweet" and "Paper Thin".

The album was supported by the release of two singles. The album's lead single "Bittersweet" was released on 25 February 2020. La Havas released "Paper Thin" on 4 May 2020, the same day that the album was announced.

== Critical reception ==
Professional ratings
Aggregate scores
Source	Rating
AnyDecentMusic?	8.0/10
Metacritic	83/100
Review scores
Source	Rating
AllMusic	4.5/5 stars
The Daily Telegraph	4/5 stars
musicOMH	5/5 stars
NME	4/5 stars
The Observer	4/5 stars
Q	3/5 stars
Slant Magazine	4/5 stars
Pitchfork	7.8/10
The Times	4/5 stars

Lianne La Havas received widespread acclaim from critics. At Metacritic, which assigns a normalized rating out of 100 to reviews from mainstream publications, the album received an average score of 83, based on 19 reviews. Aggregator AnyDecentMusic? gave it 8.0 out of 10, based on their assessment of the critical consensus.

The album's eclectic musical style was well received by reviewers. musicOMH writer Chloe Johnson described the album as "truly captivating" saying "every song is an earworm, and Lianne La Havas’ third album is haunting in the way only inspiring music can claim to be; a beautiful ghost to soundtrack your life to." NME's Jenessa Williams similarly praised the album's composition observing that "‘Lianne La Havas’ is a far more cohesive record than any of its predecessors, focused around a primary nucleus of intimate vocals, nimble guitar-work and driving percussion." Michael Cragg from The Observer summarised the album saying "While there are still nods to the polite dinner-party soundtrack feel of her early work – the string-drenched Courage, for example – this is a much bolder statement of intent."

Other reviews recognized that the album's lyrical exploration. Neil McCormick from The Daily Telegraph called the album a "jazzy, soulful, understated account of breakup and recovery, that shimmers like a gorgeous summer groove and lets La Havas's tender singing and cryptic lyrics carry the bittersweet emotion." Slant Magazine writer Sophia Ordaz believed "the album instantly feels more purposeful than its predecessor: Where Blood can feel labored over, perhaps too hungry for hits, Lianne La Havas isn't seemingly beholden to such expectations." Andy Kellman made a similar comparison in the review for AllMusic, claiming that "La Havas' lithe voice forms a tighter bond with the lyrics, and her gently ringing guitar rarely leaves her hands."

Rachel Aroesti from Q was more critical and believed "there's a wobbly quality to La Havas's toplines that means they can get lost in the more densely instrumented tracks, yet the sparser finger-picked guitar numbers give her songwriting space to shine."

== Track listing ==
Lianne La Havas track listing
No.	Title	Writer(s)	Producer(s)	Length
1.	"Bittersweet"	Lianne La Havas; Matthew Hales; DiFosco Ervin, Jr.; Isaac Hayes; Rudy Love	La Havas; Hales; Beni Giles	4:52
2.	"Read My Mind"	La Havas; Hales; Benjamin Edwards	La Havas; Hales; Giles	4:48
3.	"Green Papaya"	La Havas; Hales; Samuel Crowe; Frida Touray	La Havas; Crowe; Giles^{[a]}	4:05
4.	"Can't Fight"	La Havas; Hales; Alexander Crossan	La Havas; Hales; Giles; Mura Masa	3:10
5.	"Paper Thin"	La Havas; Hales	La Havas; Homer Steinweiss; Joe Harrison; Hales^{[v]}	4:58
6.	"Out of Your Mind" (interlude)	La Havas; Geordan Reid-Campbell	La Havas; Geo	1:04
7.	"Weird Fishes"	Thom Yorke; Jonny Greenwood; Colin Greenwood; Ed O'Brien; Philip Selway	La Havas; Giles	5:54
8.	"Please Don't Make Me Cry"	La Havas; Hales; Nicholas Hakim	La Havas; Hakim; Giles^{[a]}; Hales^{[v]}	5:14
9.	"Seven Times"	La Havas; Hales	La Havas; Hales; Giles	3:30
10.	"Courage"	La Havas; Hales; Joseph Harrison	La Havas; Harrison; Hales^{[v]}	3:38
11.	"Sour Flower"	La Havas; Hales; Crowe	La Havas; Chris Tabron; Hales^{[v]}	6:47
Total length:				48:06

Notes

- A 3:56 edit of "Bittersweet" is included at the end of some digital editions. "Out of Your Mind (interlude)" is included as a hidden track after "Paper Thin" on physical editions.

Sampling credits

- "Bittersweet" contains a sample of "Medley: "Ike's Rap III" / "Your Love Is So Doggone Good" performed by Isaac Hayes
- "Weird Fishes" is a cover version of "Weird Fishes / Arpeggi" (2007) performed by Radiohead, written by Thom Yorke, Jonny Greenwood, Colin Greenwood, Ed O'Brien and Philip Selway.

== Personnel ==
Musicians

- Lianne La Havas – lead vocals (all tracks), backing vocals (1, 3, 7, 11), guitar (1–5, 7–11), snare drums (8)
- James Wyatt – backing vocals, keyboards (1, 7); Moog, piano, Rhodes (2); claps, vocal arrangement, vocoder (7)
- Frida Touray – backing vocals (1, 3, 7), claps (7)
- Yves Fernandez – bass guitar (1, 2, 4, 7, 9), claps (7)
- Dan See – drums, percussion (1, 2, 4, 7, 9); additional drums (8)
- Richard Adlam – drums, keyboards, programming (1)
- Hal Ritson – drums, keyboards, programming (1)
- Elroy Powell – vocals (1)
- Dan Grech – additional programming (1, 7)
- Bruno Major – guitar, piano (2)
- Sam Crowe – keyboards (2, 11), piano (3, 11); Rhodes, Moog (3)
- Chris Tabron – keyboards (2)
- Davide Rossi – string arrangement, cello, viola, violin (4)
- Joe Harrison – bass guitar (5); guitar, keyboards (10)
- Homer Steinwess – drums (5)
- Geordan Reid-Campbell – bass guitar, drums, keyboards, percussion (6)
- Nick Hakim – backing vocals, drum programming, electric guitar, Mellotron, Minimoog, Wurlitzer (8)
- Matt Hales – bass guitar, drum programming, Rhodes (9)
- Gareth Lockrane – flute (9)
- Tim Mcnalley – cello, viola (10)
- Paul Castelluzzo – whistle (10)
- Burniss Travis – double bass (11)
- Mark Guiliana – drums, percussion (11)

Technical

- Stuart Hawkes – mastering (1–)
- Dan Grech – mixing (1, 7)
- Renaud Letang – mixing (2, 4)
- Beni Giles – mixing (3, 9), additional vocal recording (3)
- Matt Hales – mixing (5, 6, 10), vocal engineering (2, 10, 11)
- Chris Tabron – mixing (8, 11), engineering (11)
- Robert Wilkes – engineering (1, 2, 7), additional vocal recording (3)
- Daniel Moyler – engineering (2, 4, 9), additional vocal recording (7)
- Sam Crowe – engineering (3)
- Joe Harrison – engineering (5)
- Homer Steinwess – engineering (5)
- Geordan Reid-Campbell – engineering (6)
- Nick Hakim – engineering, recording (8)
- Bill Malina – engineering (10)
- Nate Odden – engineering (11)
- Brandon Peralta – mixing assistance (8, 11), engineering assistance (11)
- Jonny Breakwell – engineering assistance (2, 4, 9), additional vocal recording (7)
- Augusto Sanchez – engineering assistance (11)

== Charts ==
Chart performance for Lianne La Havas
Chart (2020)	Peak position
Austrian Albums (Ö3 Austria)	44
Belgian Albums (Ultratop Flanders)	8
Belgian Albums (Ultratop Wallonia)	49
Dutch Albums (Album Top 100)	9
French Albums (SNEP)	106
German Albums (Offizielle Top 100)	20
Hungarian Albums (MAHASZ)	7
Scottish Albums (Official Charts)	8
Swiss Albums (Schweizer Hitparade)	6
UK Albums (Official Charts)	7
UK R&B Albums (Official Charts)	1
US Top Album Sales (Billboard)	26

== Release history ==
Region	Date	Format	Label	Ref.
Various	17 July 2020	CD; LP; digital download; streaming	Warner	
