= Lianne La Havas =

British musician

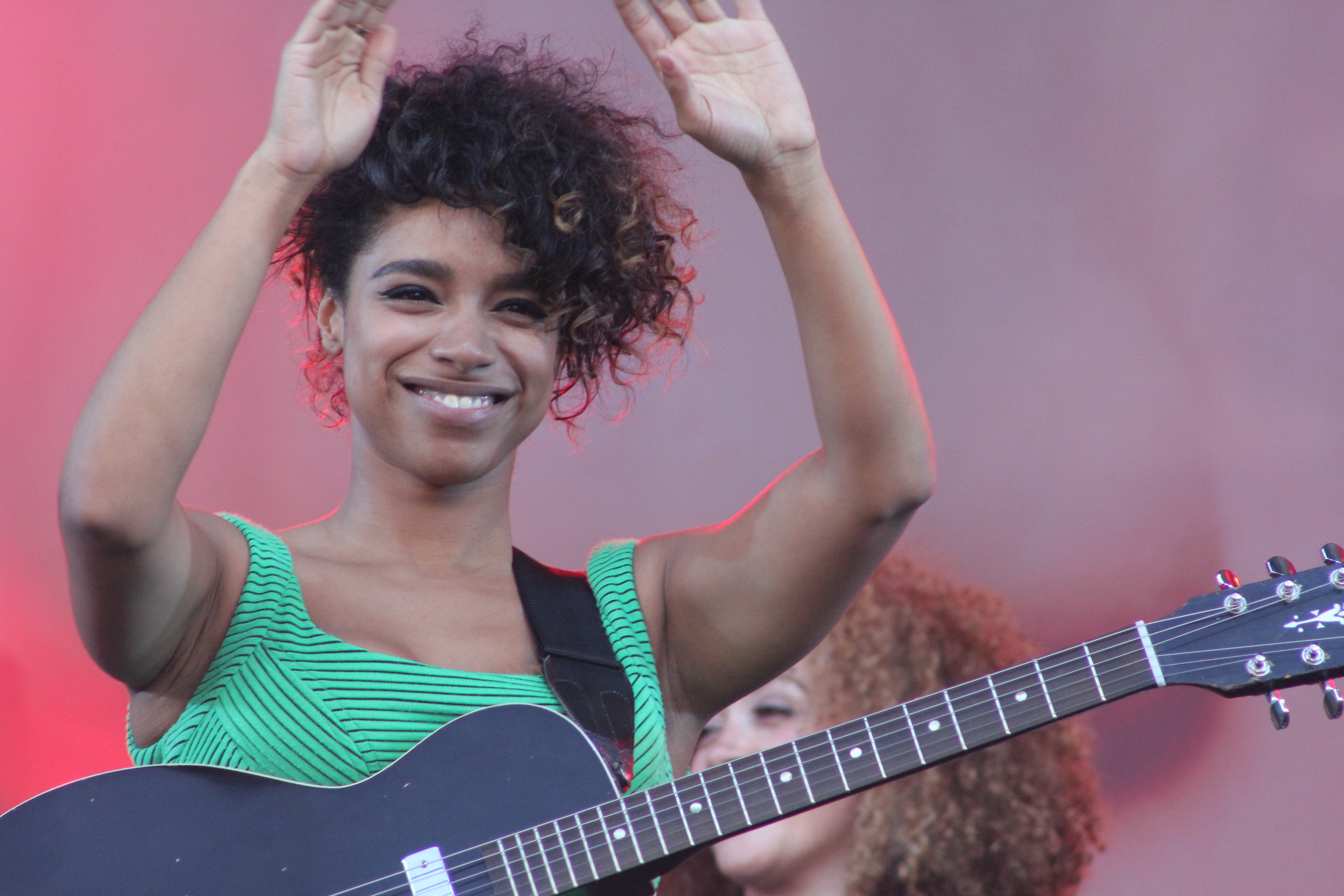
- La Havas in 2013

Background information
- Born: Lianne Charlotte Barnes; 23 August 1989 (age 37); London, England
- Genres: Soul; Jazz fusion; R&B
- Occupation: Singer-songwriter
- Instruments: Vocals; guitar
- Years active: 2011–present
- Labels: Warner Bros.; Nonesuch; Labour of Love
- Website: www.liannelahavas.com

Lianne Charlotte Barnes (born 23 August 1989), known professionally as Lianne La Havas (/liˈæn ləˈhævəs/ lee-AN lə-HAV-əs), is a British singer-songwriter. Her career began after being introduced to various musicians, including singer Paloma Faith, for whom she sang backing vocals. In 2010, La Havas signed to Warner Bros. Records, spending two years developing her songwriting, before releasing any music. La Havas' debut studio album, Is Your Love Big Enough? (2012), was released to positive reviews from critics and earned her a nomination for the BBC's Sound of 2012 poll and awards for the iTunes Album of The Year 2012. She has released two other studio albums since, Blood in 2015 and Lianne La Havas in 2020. She was nominated once for a Grammy award in 2016 and twice for the Brit Awards, in 2017 and 2021. She currently lives in London.

== Early life ==
La Havas was born and raised in London, England, to a Greek father and Jamaican mother. She was raised in Tooting and Streatham, spending the majority of her time with her grandparents after her parents separated. La Havas began singing at seven, and she cites her parents' diverse musical tastes as having the biggest influence on her music. Her father, an accomplished multi-instrumentalist, taught her the basics of guitar and piano. La Havas wrote her first song at the age of 11 but did not learn to play the guitar until she was 18 years old. She sang in her school choir. She attended Norbury Manor Business and Enterprise College for Girls in Thornton Heath, where she studied her A-levels. She had planned to take an art foundation course before she decided to leave college to pursue a career in music full-time.

Her stage name is a phoneticization of her father's surname.

== Career ==
=== Beginnings and debut (2008–2014) ===
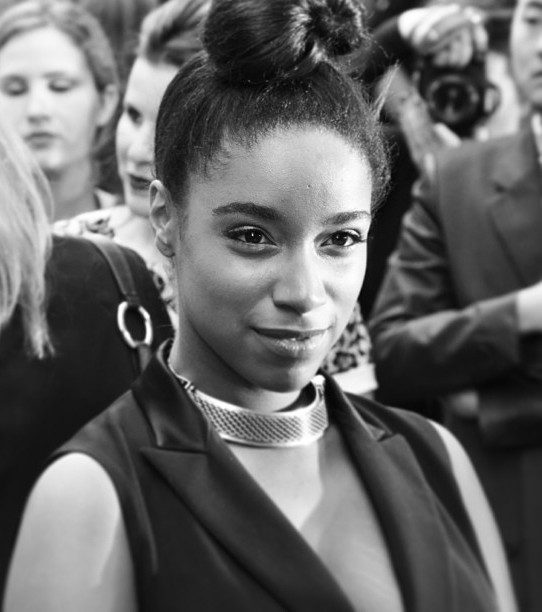
Lianne La Havas in 2012

Whilst attending sixth-form in Croydon, La Havas was introduced to musicians who would go on to assist her in the recording of her first demos. Through the same friends, La Havas was also introduced to British singer Paloma Faith; she later sang backing vocals on tour for Faith. La Havas was discovered on Myspace in 2008. Duncan Ellis, owner of Scruffy Bird Artist Management, first heard of La Havas through colleague Alex Hardee of the Coda Music Agency. When Ellis first saw La Havas perform, she was in the duo the Paris Parade, collaborating with future Elephant member Christian Pinchbeck (he later designed the artwork for Lost & Found). Paris Parade's short-lived career would kick off La Havas' career in commercial music.

In 2010, La Havas signed to Warner Bros. Records, spending two years developing her songwriting skills before releasing any music publicly.

Her first EP, Lost & Found, was released on 21 October 2011 on the Labour of Love label. It featured Willy Mason on the opening track "No Room for Doubt". That same month, La Havas released the live EP Live from LA, which was made available for free download on her website. La Havas made her television debut on the 21 October 2011 broadcast of BBC Two's Later... with Jools Holland, a programme that also featured Wisconsin folk band Bon Iver. Soon after her TV debut, on 25 October 2011, it was announced that La Havas would be the supporting act for Bon Iver's December 2011 North American tour.

Her official debut single "Lost & Found" was released in the UK on 30 April 2012, and her debut album, Is Your Love Big Enough?, was released on 9 July 2012 on Warner Brothers. At the end of 2012, Is Your Love Big Enough? was named iTunes Album of the Year.

On 24 September 2012, La Havas supported Alicia Keys at MTV 'Crashes' Manchester, a live performance in front of 1,000 people in Manchester Cathedral, broadcast in 164 countries. On 31 December 2012, she appeared on BBC Two's New Year's Eve show Jools' Annual Hootenanny, singing "Cow Cow Boogie". On 9 June 2013, La Havas played at the RockNess music festival in Inverness, Scotland, and on 30 June 2013, she performed at the Glastonbury Festival 2013. La Havas also performed at the Isle of Wight Festival in June 2013.

In early 2014, Prince played a gig in La Havas' living room in London. She also appeared on Alt-J's 2014 album This Is All Yours on the track "Warm Foothills". On 30 September 2014, Prince released Art Official Age, featuring La Havas heavily throughout the album, singing on "Clouds" and providing vocals on "Affirmation I&II", "Way Back Home" and "Affirmation III". La Havas also performed with Prince on an episode of Saturday Night Live as a featured vocalist on 1 November 2014.

She collaborated with Aqualung on the song "Eggshells" from his album 10 Features, released on 19 January 2015.

=== 2015–19: Blood ===
After touring was completed for her first album, La Havas and her mother travelled to Jamaica. During the trip, La Havas was inspired to write new material, which would eventually become part of her second album. She gave a live performance for her family and producer, Stephen McGregor, who would later co-produce her forthcoming album. Many of the songs were inspired by La Havas' reconnection to her Greek and Jamaican heritage. The first single of the album, "Unstoppable", premiered for streaming on 1 April 2015. The single, which was co-written with Paul Epworth, was officially released in the UK on 1 June 2015. Its music video premiered on 12 May 2015 on La Havas' official YouTube channel. The full album, called Blood, was released on 31 July 2015 for physical and digital formats. La Havas toured in the UK and Europe in support of album from mid-May to September 2015. The album was nominated for Best Urban Contemporary Album at the 58th Annual Grammy Awards.

La Havas features twice on Rudimental's album, We the Generation (2015), on the songs "Needn't Speak" and "Breath". She appeared on The Late Show with Stephen Colbert on CBS in the United States on 27 October 2015, singing with Colbert's regular band, New Orleans jazz bandleader Jon Batiste and Stay Human. She also performed a Tiny Desk Concert on NPR in October 2015.

In 2016 La Havas supported Coldplay on the European and Latin American legs of their A Head Full of Dreams world tour.

La Havas lately plays a hollow-bodied 1964 Harmony Alden Stratotone guitar, which is put through a Fender Hot Rod Deluxe amp on stage with her band. For solo gigs she uses a SansAmp DI, and a Roland CUBE amp is used for practice.

=== 2020: Lianne La Havas ===
La Havas released "Bittersweet" on 25 February 2020 as the lead single from her self-titled album, Lianne La Havas. On 4 May 2020, La Havas released the second single "Paper Thin" and announced that the album would be released on 17 July 2020. Recording of the album took place between October 2019 and December 2019, with sessions taking place in London, Bath, Los Angeles and New York City. The album's production was handled by La Havas along with long-term collaborator Matt Hales, co-producers Beni Giles and Sam Crowe, and guest co-producer Mura Masa.

The album won in the Best Album category at the 2021 Ivor Novello Awards. It also received a number of positive reviews from major publishers. The New York Times' chief pop music critic Jon Pareles, in his review, said:

The songs illuminate passion, impulsiveness, ambivalence and uncertainty, yet the structures La Havas created are lucid and poised. While matters of the heart may be out of control, her fingers and voice are impeccable.

Another reviewer, David Cheal, described the album in FT as "soulful" and compared it to the music of Jill Scott and Erykah Badu.

Following a five year hiatus, La Havas released "Disarray", an independently released single.

== Discography ==
- Is Your Love Big Enough? (2012)
- Blood (2015)
- Lianne La Havas (2020)

== Concert tours ==
Headlining

- Is Your Love Big Enough? Tour (2012–13)
- Blood Tour (2015–16)

Supporting

- A Head Full of Dreams Tour (2016)

== Awards and nominations ==
Year	Organisation	Award	Nominee / work	Result
2011	BBC Sound of...	Sound of 2012	Herself	Nominated
2012	Barclaycard	Mercury Prize	Is Your Love Big Enough?	Nominated
2012	iTunes Best of 2012	Album of the Year	Is Your Love Big Enough?	Won
2013	MOBO Awards	Best Female Act	Herself	Nominated
2013	MOBO Awards	Best R&B/Soul Act	Herself	Nominated
2015	MOBO Awards	Best Female Act	Herself	Nominated
2015	MOBO Awards	Best R&B/Soul Act	Herself	Nominated
2015	MOBO Awards	Best Album	Blood	Nominated
2016	58th Annual Grammy Awards	Best Urban Contemporary Album	Blood	Nominated
2017	2017 Brit Awards	British Female Solo Artist	Herself	Nominated
2021	2021 Brit Awards	British Female Solo Artist	Herself	Nominated
2021	Ivor Novello Awards	Best Album	Lianne La Havas	Won
