= Michael Bublé discography =

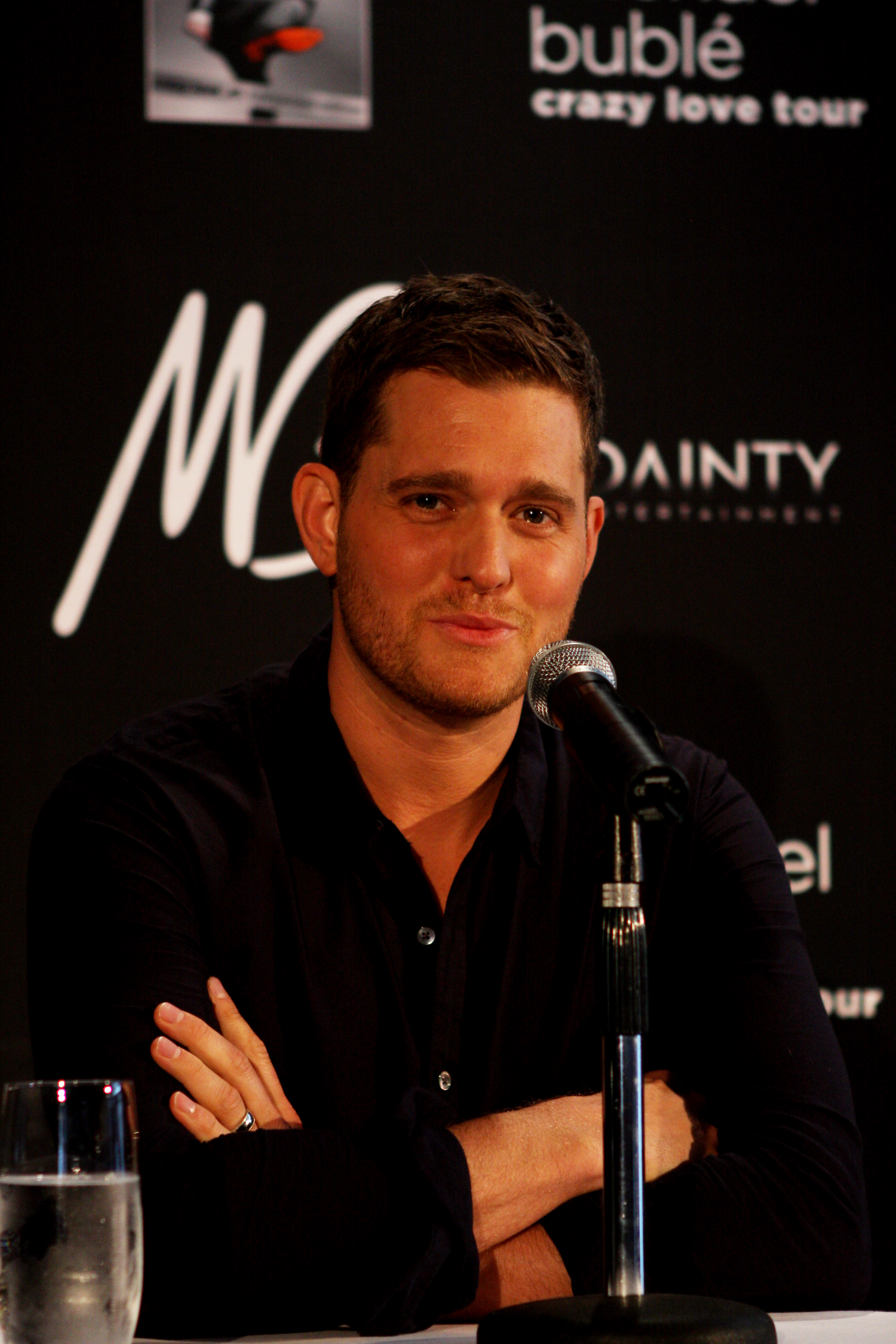
- Bublé during the Crazy Love Tour
- Studio albums: 11
- Extended plays: 9
- Live albums: 3
- Compilation albums: 1
- Singles: 18
- Music videos: 14

Canadian singer Michael Bublé has released eleven studio albums, three live albums, one compilation album, nine EPs, eighteen singles, and fourteen music videos. He has recorded for Warner Bros. Records, Reprise Records, and 143 Records. Bublé has sold over 75 million records worldwide, making him one of the best-selling Canadian artists in history. Billboard listed him as the 3rd Top Canadian Artist of all time (behind only Céline Dion and Shania Twain). He has scored 4 No. 1 albums on Billboard 200. He was listed by Billboard as the 47th Top Artist of 2010s decade, with three albums on Billboard 200 Albums of the 2010s Decade, including: Christmas (No. 24), To Be Loved (No. 179) and Crazy Love (No. 193).

Bublé debuted independently in 1995 with his first EP, First Dance. In 2001 and 2002 he released the albums BaBalu and Dream respectively, without any record company support. In 2003, he signed a record deal with 143 Records and released his first studio album Michael Bublé, which was very successful. On May 23 of that year, he released his first live album, Come Fly with Me and later his second and third EPs, Totally Bublé and Let It Snow. On February 8, 2005, Bublé released his second album, It's Time, which ended up with several certifications for its high sales. In the same year he issued his second live album Caught in the Act, launched a special Christmas edition of his self-titled studio album which obtained a silver certification in the UK and also his fourth EP, More. His fifth EP, With Love, followed the next year and achieved a gold certification in the US.

In 2007, he released his third studio album, Call Me Irresponsible and the next year released his sixth EP, A Taste of Bublé. Bublé's third live album, Michael Bublé Meets Madison Square Garden, was released on July 16, 2009, and his fourth studio album, Crazy Love, saw release in October of the same year. In 2011, he released his fifth studio album, Christmas, which contained carols and collaborations with the Puppini Sisters, Thalía, and Shania Twain. This album is considered the most prestigious of Bublé's because of its many certifications and is one of the best-selling albums of 2011. The same year he released the EP A Holiday Gift for You, which contains extra songs that were not included on the Christmas album. Bublé's sixth album, To Be Loved, was released on April 23, 2013. His seventh album, Nobody But Me, was released on October 21, 2016. His eighth album, Love, was released on November 16, 2018. His ninth and latest album, Higher, was released on March 25, 2022.

== Albums ==
=== Studio albums ===
Title	Album details	Peak chart positions										Certifications	Sales
Title	Album details	CAN	AUS	AUT	GER	IRE	NLD	SWE	SWI	UK	US	Certifications	Sales
BaBalu	Released: 2001; Label: Self-released; Formats: Cassette, CD	—	—	—	—	—	—	—	—	—	—		
Dream	Released: 2002; Label: Self-released; Formats: Cassette, CD	—	—	—	—	—	—	—	—	—	—		
Michael Bublé	Released: February 11, 2003; Label: 143, Reprise; Formats: Cassette, CD, digital download	7	1	—	49	8	32	28	53	6	47	MC: 4× Platinum; ARIA: 7× Platinum; BPI: 2× Platinum; RIAA: Platinum	
It's Time	Released: February 8, 2005; Label: 143, Reprise; Formats: CD, digital download	1	2	3	2	5	2	4	7	4	7	MC: 6× Platinum; ARIA: 5× Platinum; BPI: 3× Platinum; BVMI: 2× Platinum; IFPI AUT: Gold; IFPI SWI: Platinum; IRMA: Platinum; RIAA: 3× Platinum	UK: 881,000; US: 3,832,000
Call Me Irresponsible	Released: May 1, 2007; Label: 143, Reprise; Formats: CD, digital download	1	1	2	1	1	1	5	3	2	1	MC: 4× Platinum; ARIA: 5× Platinum; BPI: Platinum (standard edition); BPI: 3× Platinum (special edition); BVMI: Platinum; RIAA: Platinum; RMNZ: Platinum	WW: 4,100,000; UK: 990,000 (special edition); US: 2,244,000
Crazy Love	Released: October 9, 2009; Label: 143, Reprise; Formats: CD, digital download	1	1	8	5	1	2	17	4	1	1	MC: 4× Platinum; ARIA: 5× Platinum; BPI: 10× Platinum; BVMI: Platinum; IRMA: 15× Platinum; NVPI: Platinum; RIAA: 2× Platinum	UK: 3,137,898
Christmas	Released: October 25, 2011; Label: 143, Reprise; Formats: CD, digital download	1	1	1	1	1	1	1	1	1	1	MC: Diamond; ARIA: 2× Diamond; IFPI AUT: 3× Platinum; BPI: 11× Platinum; BVMI: 5× Gold; GLF: Gold; IRMA: 8× Platinum; IFPI SWI: Platinum; RIAA: 6× Platinum; RMNZ: 14× Platinum	WW: 16,000,000; CAN: 1,500,000; AUS: 1,000,000; UK: 3,200,000; US: 4,500,000
To Be Loved	Released: April 23, 2013; Label: 143, Reprise; Formats: CD, digital download	1	1	1	2	1	1	3	1	1	1	MC: 4× Platinum; ARIA: Platinum; IFPI AUT: Platinum; BPI: 2× Platinum; BVMI: 3× Gold; IRMA: 2× Platinum; RIAA: Platinum; RMNZ: 2× Platinum	WW: 3,000,000; CAN: 350,000; UK: 831,000; US: 881,000
Nobody but Me	Released: October 21, 2016; Label: Reprise; Formats: CD, digital download	2	2	3	4	2	4	16	5	2	2	MC: Platinum; ARIA: Gold; BPI: Platinum; RMNZ: Gold	WW: 1,200,000; US: 85,000
Love	Released: November 16, 2018; Label: Reprise; Formats: CD, digital download	1	2	2	6	4	4	27	3	1	2	MC: Platinum; BPI: Platinum; IFPI AUT: Gold; RMNZ: Gold	US: 105,000
Higher	Released: March 25, 2022; Label: Reprise; Formats: CD, digital download	3	2	5	7	8	11	—	9	1	12	BPI: Silver	
"—" denotes album that did not chart or was not released.

=== Live albums ===
Title	Album details	Peak chart positions									Certifications
Title	Album details	CAN	AUS	AUT	GER	IRE	NLD	SWI	UK	US	Certifications
Come Fly with Me	Released: March 8, 2004; Label: 143, Reprise; Formats: CD, digital download	—	18	—	—	37	40	—	52	55	MC: 3× Platinum; ARIA: Gold; BPI: Gold
Caught in the Act	Released: July 8, 2005; Label: 143, Reprise; Formats: CD, digital download	26	15	30	31	19	26	51	25	82	MC: 8× Platinum; ARIA: Gold; BPI: Gold
Michael Bublé Meets Madison Square Garden	Released: June 16, 2009; Label: 143, Reprise; Formats: CD, digital download	—	23	47	71	5	7	67	22	14	BPI: Silver

=== Compilation albums ===
Title	Album details	Peak chart positions			Certifications
Title	Album details	AUT	UK	US	Certifications
The Best of Bublé	Released: September 27, 2024; Label: Reprise; Formats: CD, LP, digital download	68	53	159	BPI: Silver

== Extended plays ==
Title	Extended play details	Peak chart positions				Certifications
Title	Extended play details	CAN	IRE	UK	US	Certifications
First Dance	Released: June 2, 1995; Label: Self-released; Formats: Cassette, CD	—	—	—	—	
Totally Bublé	Released: September 9, 2003; Label: DRG; Formats: CD, digital download	—	24	181	—	
Let It Snow!	Released: November 25, 2003; Label: 143, Reprise; Format: CD, digital download	38	—	71	32	
More	Released: June 26, 2005; Label: 143, Reprise; Format: CD, digital download	—	—	—	—	
With Love	Released: February 14, 2006; Label: 143, Reprise; Format: CD, digital download	—	—	—	—	RIAA: Gold
A Taste of Bublé	Released: April 29, 2008; Label: 143, Reprise; Format: CD, digital download	—	—	—	35	
Special Delivery	Released: February 5, 2010; Label: 143, Reprise; Format: CD, digital download	—	79	—	26	
Hollywood: The Deluxe EP	Released: October 25, 2010; Label: 143, Reprise; Format: CD, digital download	13	—	—	10	
A Holiday Gift for You	Released: December 1, 2010; Label: 143, Reprise; Format: Digital download	—	—	—	—	
"—" denotes EP that did not chart or was not released

== Singles ==
List of singles, with selected chart positions, showing year released and album name
Title	Year	Peak chart positions										Certifications	Album
Title	Year	CAN	AUS	AUT	GER	IRE	NLD	SWE	SWI	UK	US	Certifications	Album
"How Can You Mend a Broken Heart"	2003	—	—	—	—	—	—	—	—	—	—		Michael Bublé
"Kissing a Fool"	2003	—	—	—	—	—	—	—	—	—	—		Michael Bublé
"Sway"	2004	—	15	—	—	—	—	—	—	200	— (Note: "Sway" did not enter the Billboard Hot 100 Chart but peaked at number 24 on the US Adult Contemporary Chart.)	RMNZ: Gold	Michael Bublé
"Spider-Man Theme"	2004	6	21	—	—	—	—	—	—	—	—		Michael Bublé
"Feeling Good"	2005	—	70	66	36	—	61	—	—	69	—	BPI: Platinum; RMNZ: Platinum	It's Time
"Home"	2005	—	35	36	55	42	56	55	33	31	72	RIAA: Platinum; BPI: Platinum; RMNZ: Platinum	It's Time
"Home" / "Song for You"	2005	—	—	—	—	—	—	—	—	45	—		It's Time
"Save the Last Dance for Me"	2006	—	—	—	—	—	—	—	—	—	99	RIAA: Gold	It's Time
"Everything"	2007	10	19	34	39	39	5	43	28	38	46	RIAA: Platinum; BPI: Platinum; RMNZ: Platinum	Call Me Irresponsible
"Me and Mrs. Jones"	2007	—	—	—	—	—	—	—	68	127	—		Call Me Irresponsible
"Lost"	2007	25	—	55	44	24	30	—	66	19	97	BPI: Silver	Call Me Irresponsible
"It Had Better Be Tonight"	2007	89	—	—	—	—	—	—	—	74	—		Call Me Irresponsible
"Comin' Home Baby" (featuring Boyz II Men)	2008	—	—	—	—	—	—	—	—	—	—		Call Me Irresponsible
"Haven't Met You Yet"	2009	5	9	54	53	5	16	39	37	5	24	MC: Platinum; ARIA: 2× Platinum; RIAA: Platinum; BPI: Platinum; RMNZ: Platinum	Crazy Love
"Hold On"	2009	87	—	—	—	—	—	—	—	72	—		Crazy Love
"Baby (You've Got What It Takes)"	2009	—	—	—	—	—	—	—	—	—	—		Crazy Love
"Cry Me a River"	2010	—	—	—	—	29	—	—	—	34	—	BPI: Silver	Crazy Love
"Crazy Love"	2010	—	—	—	—	—	—	—	—	122	—		Crazy Love
"Hollywood"	2010	17	91	—	—	2	52	—	—	11	55	BPI: Silver	Crazy Love
"Don't Get Around Much Anymore" (featuring Tony Bennett)	2011	38	—	—	—	—	—	—	—	—	—		Duets II
"All I Want for Christmas Is You"	2011	—	76	—	80	—	88	39	—	149	99	BPI: Gold; RMNZ: Gold	Christmas
"Georgia on My Mind"^{A} (featuring Ray Charles)	2012	—	—	—	—	—	—	—	—	—	—		Crazy Love
"It's Beginning to Look a Lot Like Christmas" / "Jingle Bells" (featuring The Puppini Sisters)	2012	4	3	6	5	7	3	4	4	6	12	BPI: 4× Platinum; BVMI: Platinum; RMNZ: 3× Platinum	Christmas
"White Christmas"^{B} (featuring Bing Crosby)	2012	72	—	32	27	—	—	—	52	—	—		Christmas
"It's a Beautiful Day"	2013	20	33	24	28	28	24	—	32	10	94	ARIA: Gold; BPI: Gold; RMNZ: Gold	To Be Loved
"Close Your Eyes"	2013	—	—	—	—	77	—	—	—	72	—		To Be Loved
"After All" (featuring Bryan Adams)	2013	96	—	—	—	—	—	—	—	—	—		To Be Loved
"You've Got a Friend in Me"	2013	—	—	—	—	—	—	—	—	—	—		To Be Loved
"You Make Me Feel So Young"	2013	—	—	—	—	—	—	—	—	—	—		To Be Loved
"To Love Somebody"	2014	—	—	—	—	—	—	—	—	—	—		To Be Loved
"Baby, It's Cold Outside" (with Idina Menzel)	2014	58	58	—	—	62	—	—	—	39	78	BPI: Platinum; RMNZ: Gold	Holiday Wishes
"The More You Give (The More You'll Have)"	2015	—	97	—	—	—	—	—	—	—	—		Non-album single
"Nobody but Me"	2016	70	—	—	—	—	—	—	—	77	—		Nobody but Me
"I Believe in You"	2016	—	—	—	—	—	—	—	—	—	—		Nobody but Me
"When I Fall in Love"	2018	—	—	—	—	—	—	—	—	—	—		Love
"Love You Anymore"	2018	—	—	—	—	—	—	—	—	—	—		Love
"Such a Night"	2018	—	—	—	—	—	—	—	—	—	—		Love
"Forever Now"	2019	—	—	—	—	—	—	—	—	—	—		Love
"Gotta Be Patient" (with Barenaked Ladies and Sofia Reyes)	2020	—	—	—	—	—	—	—	—	—	—		Non-album single
"Elita" (with Gary Barlow & Sebastián Yatra)	2020	—	—	—	—	—	—	—	—	—	—		Music Played by Humans
"Cuddle Up, Cozy Down Christmas" (with Dolly Parton)	2020	—	—	—	—	52	—	—	—	55	—		A Holly Dolly Christmas
"I'll Never Not Love You"	2022	68	—	—	—	—	—	—	—	—	—		Higher
"Higher"	2022	—	—	—	—	—	—	—	—	—	—		Higher
"Spicy Margarita" (with Jason Derulo)	2024	—	—	—	—	—	—	—	—	80	—		Nu King
"Maybe This Christmas" (with Carly Pearce)	2024	79	—	—	—	—	—	—	—	—	— (Note: "Maybe This Christmas" did not enter the Billboard Hot 100, but peaked at number 6 on the Bubbling Under Hot 100 chart.)		Non-album single
"—" denotes single that did not chart or was not released

=== Notes ===
- ^{A} Released as a limited edition single for Record Store Day 2012, therefore ineligible to chart
- ^{B} Released to promote Michael Bublé: Home for the Holidays, which features a performance of the song with Bing. Shania Twain appears on the album version

== Other charted and certified songs ==
List of other charted songs, with selected chart positions, showing year released and album name
Title	Year	Peak chart positions										Certifications	Album
Title	Year	CAN	AUS	AUT	GER	IRE	NLD	SWE	SWI	UK	US	Certifications	Album
"Let It Snow!"	2003	—	22	25	35	32	56	—	28	—	—		Let It Snow!
"Moondance"	2007	—	—	—	—	—	—	—	—	178	—		Michael Bublé
"Have Yourself a Merry Little Christmas"	2011	—	48	—	—	—	—	57	—	78	41	RMNZ: Gold	Christmas
"Santa Claus Is Coming to Town"	2011	—	48	71	66	77	38	43	43	77	—	BPI: Platinum; RMNZ: Gold	Christmas
"Blue Christmas"	2011	—	—	—	—	—	—	—	—	—	—	BPI: Silver	Christmas
"Christmas (Baby Please Come Home)"	2011	—	87	57	43	93	58	31	—	47	—	BPI: Platinum	Christmas
"Silent Night"	2011	—	—	—	—	—	—	—	—	—	—	RMNZ: Gold	Christmas
"Cold December Night"	2011	96	80	—	91	—	—	—	—	—	—	BPI: Silver; RMNZ: Gold	Christmas
"White Christmas" (featuring Shania Twain)	2011	86	50	35	31	—	36	35	33	134	—	BPI: Silver; RMNZ: Gold	Christmas
"Jingle Bells" (featuring The Puppini Sisters)	2011	—	24	—	—	—	56	56	—	155	—	BPI: Silver; RMNZ: Gold	Christmas
"Winter Wonderland"	2012	—	84	—	60	—	—	—	—	132	—	BPI: Silver; RMNZ: Gold	Christmas
"Home" (featuring Blake Shelton)	2012	—	—	—	—	—	—	—	—	—	—	BPI: Platinum; RMNZ: Gold	Cheers, It's Christmas
"Who's Lovin' You"	2013	—	—	—	—	—	—	—	—	133	—		To Be Loved
"Holly Jolly Christmas"	2014	12	7	18	20	21	13	34	14	21	33	BPI: Platinum; RMNZ: Platinum	Christmas
"Santa Baby"	2014	—	97	—	—	—	—	—	—	192	—	BPI: Silver	Christmas
"I'll Be Home for Christmas"	2019	—	78	—	—	—	71	—	82	—	—	RMNZ: Gold	Christmas
"Let It Snow! (10th Anniversary)"	2021	—	—	—	—	—	—	—	—	44	— (Note: "Let It Snow! (10th Anniversary)" did not enter the Billboard Hot 100, but peaked at number 14 on the Bubbling Under Hot 100 chart.)		Christmas
"The Christmas Sweater"	2021	74	—	—	76	74	—	—	—	61	— (Note: "The Christmas Sweater" did not enter the Billboard Hot 100, but peaked at number seven on the Bubbling Under Hot 100 chart.)		Christmas
"—" denotes single that did not chart or was not released.

=== Holiday 100 chart entries ===
Since many radio stations in the US adopt a format change to Christmas music each December, many holiday hits have an annual spike in popularity during the last few weeks of the year and are retired once the season is over. In December 2011, Billboard began a Holiday Songs chart with 50 positions that monitors the last five weeks of each year to "rank the top holiday hits of all eras using the same methodology as the Hot 100, blending streaming, airplay, and sales data", and in 2013 the number of positions on the chart was doubled, resulting in the Holiday 100. Many Bublé recordings have made appearances on the Holiday 100, including his rendition of "It's Beginning to Look a Lot Like Christmas", which as of 2025 has charted in the Top 10 in four different years, and are noted below according to the holiday season in which they charted there.

Title	Holiday season peak chart positions															Album
Title	2011	2012	2013	2014	2015	2016	2017	2018	2019	2020	2021	2022	2023	2024	2025	Album
"All I Want for Christmas Is You"	21	13	55	54	48	57	60	100	—	—	—	—	—	—	—	Christmas
"Ave Maria"	—	—	88	—	—	—	—	—	—	—	—	—	—	—	—	Christmas
"Baby, It's Cold Outside" (Duet with Idina Menzel)	—	—	—	14	31	41	47	66	86	94	83	89	89	82	100	Holiday Wishes
"Blue Christmas"	—	—	91	—	—	—	—	—	—	—	—	—	—	—	—	Christmas
"Christmas (Baby Please Come Home)"	—	24	69	75	67	68	40	58	62	61	61	56	55	68	64	Christmas
"The Christmas Song"	—	—	—	—	90	88	90	—	—	—	—	—	—	—	—	Let It Snow!
"The Christmas Sweater"	—	—	—	—	—	—	—	—	—	—	96	—	—	—	—	Christmas (10th anniversary deluxe edition)
"Cold December Night"	—	41	—	—	—	90	72	91	—	—	—	—	—	—	—	Christmas
"Have Yourself a Merry Little Christmas"	45	30	58	64	37	75	65	24	33	29	28	33	33	40	50	Christmas
"Holly Jolly Christmas"	—	22	44	39	33	43	22	41	39	27	36	41	34	28	24	Christmas
"I'll Be Home for Christmas"	—	—	56	44	90	—	—	68	68	70	45	46	51	86	83	Christmas
"It's Beginning to Look a Lot Like Christmas"	16	10	15	14	13	16	10	16	23	14	8	15	14	11	9	Christmas
"Jingle Bells" (featuring The Puppini Sisters)	—	37	—	82	88	66	53	87	—	—	—	—	—	—	—	Christmas
"Let It Snow! Let It Snow! Let It Snow!"	—	—	86	100	—	—	45	—	—	—	—	—	—	—	—	Let It Snow!
"Let It Snow! (10th Anniversary)"	—	—	—	—	—	—	—	—	—	—	91	94	—	—	—	Christmas (10th anniversary deluxe edition)
"Santa Buddy (Santa Baby)"	—	—	34	60	94	99	—	—	—	—	—	—	—	—	—	Christmas
"Santa Claus Is Coming to Town"	—	35	93	67	53	51	58	63	76	96	78	—	96	95	—	Christmas
"Silent Night"	—	—	81	—	—	—	74	—	—	—	—	—	—	—	—	Christmas
"White Christmas" (Duet with Shania Twain)	—	29	29	22	57	53	79	—	—	—	—	—	—	—	—	Christmas
"Winter Wonderland"	—	—	—	—	—	—	93	—	—	—	—	—	—	—	—	Christmas

== Other appearances ==
Title	Year	Featured artist(s)	Album
"Strangers in the Night"	2000		Duets
"Dumb ol' Heart"	2000		Here's to Life!
"I've Never Been in Love Before"	2000		Here's to Life!
"When You're Smiling"	2000		Here's to Life!
"Down with Love"	2003	Holly Palmer	Down with Love
"I Won't Dance"	2004	Jane Monheit	Taking a Chance on Love
"Elf's Lament"	2004	Barenaked Ladies	Barenaked for the Holidays
"Let There Be Love"	2005	Chris Botti	To Love Again
"Peroxide Swing"	2005		Saint Germain des Prés Café, Vol. 7
"Just in Time"	2006	Tony Bennett	Duets: An American Classic
"Steppin' Out with My Baby"	2006	Tony Bennett	Duets: An American Classic
"How About You?"	2007	Lou Pomanti	Words to Music: The Canadian Songwriters Hall of Fame
"Too Close for Comfort"	2007		We All Love Ella: Celebrating the First Lady of Song
"You Are My Destiny"	2007	Paul Anka	Classic Songs, My Way
"L-O-V-E"	2007		Why Did I Get Married?
"Baby, It's Cold Outside"	2008	Anne Murray	Anne Murray's Christmas Album
"Mr. Templeton"	2009		Flu Shot
"When I Fall in Love"	2009	Boyz II Men	Love
"Baby, It's Cold Outside"	2009	Jennifer Hudson	Jennifer Hudson: I'll Be Home for Christmas
"Let It Snow!"	2009	Jennifer Hudson	Jennifer Hudson: I'll Be Home for Christmas
"Everybody Hurts"	2010	Various	Helping Haiti
"Gracias a la Vida"	2010	Various	Gracias a la Vida
"Maple Leaf Forever"	2010		Sounds of Vancouver 2010: Closing Ceremony Commemorative Album
"How Deep Is Your Love"	2011	Kelly Rowland	Home for Christmas
"Don't Get Around Much Anymore"	2011	Tony Bennett	Duets II
"Damn"	2012	Styles of Beyond	Reseda Beach
"Winter Wonderland"	2012	Rod Stewart	Merry Christmas, Baby
"Bésame Mucho"	2012	Thalía	Habítame siempre
"Pennies from Heaven"	2013	Paul Anka	Duets
"You'll Never Find Another Love Like Mine"	2013	Laura Pausini	20 - The Greatest Hits
"Soda Pop"	2013	Robbie Williams	Swings Both Ways
"It Had to Be You"	2014	Barbra Streisand	Partners
"Baby, It's Cold Outside"	2014	Idina Menzel	Holiday Wishes
"Alone Again (Naturally)"	2015	Diana Krall	Wallflower
"Fever"	2015	Elvis Presley	If I Can Dream
"Elita"	2020	Gary Barlow	Music Played by Humans

== Music videos ==
Title	Year	Director
"Sway"	2003	Peter Kasden
"Moondance"	2004	Peter Kasden
"Spider-Man Theme"	2004	Mike Danson
"Feeling Good"	2005	Noble Jones
"Home"	2005	Noble Jones
"Save the Last Dance for Me"	2005	Noble Jones
"Everything"	2007	Sean Turrell
"Me and Mrs. Jones"	2007	Sean Turrell
"Lost"	2007	Andrew MacNaughtan
"Haven't Met You Yet"	2009	Rich Lee
"Hold On"	2009	Rich Lee
"Cry Me a River"	2009	Brett Sullivan
"Crazy Love"	2010	Brett Sullivan
"Hollywood"	2010	Rich Lee
"Don't Get Around Much Anymore"	2011	Dex Lawson
"All I Want for Christmas Is You"	2011	Nicole Miller
"Santa Claus Is Coming To Town"	2011	
"It's a Beautiful Day"	2013	Marc Klasfeld
"Close Your Eyes"	2013	Marc Klasfeld & Brett Sullivan
"After All"	2013	
"You Make Me Feel So Young"	2013	Brett Sullivan
"To Love Somebody"	2014	Brett Sullivan
"When I Fall In Love"	2018	
"Love You Anymore"	2018	Ben Mor
"White Christmas [Official Animated Video]"	2019	Lior Molcho
"Let It Snow [10th Anniversary]"	2021	James Larese
"It's Beginning to Look a Lot Like Christmas"	2021	
"The Christmas Sweater"	2021	Lior Molcho
