= The Best of Bublé =

Greatest hits album by Michael Bublé
- Released: September 27, 2024
- Length: 77:54
- Label: Reprise

Michael Bublé chronology
Higher (2022)	The Best of Bublé (2024)

Singles from The Best of Bublé
- 1. "Don't Blame it On Me" Released: August 8, 2025

The Best of Bublé is a greatest hits album by Michael Bublé, released on September 27, 2024 by Reprise Records.

== Background and release ==
It was announced on August 8, 2024, with an announced release date of September 27 that same year. The compilation was released by Reprise Records on the announced date. On January 6, 2025, a singalong version of the album was released.

== Critical reception ==
Professional ratings
Review scores
Source	Rating
AllMusic	4/5 stars

Writing for AllMusic, Matt Collar wrote it "brings together all of his biggest and most loved hits", noting it "brings together both, touching on some of his most popular renditions of classic songs". In a review for the Associated Press, Martina Inchigolo calls it a "celebration of the Canadian singer’s best work", She notes it "does more than rehash the past. "The Best of Bublé" welcomes in the new through two unreleased songs, illustrating his range and elastic approach to genre", she concludes in her review that "is one to place under the tree, a delightful catalogue representing a modern classic voice."

== Track listing ==
No.	Title	Writer(s)	Original album	Length
1.	"Feeling Good"	Anthony Newley; Leslie Bricusse	It's Time (2005)	3:56
2.	"Haven't Met You Yet"	Michael Bublé; Alan Chang; Amy Foster-Gillies	Crazy Love (2009)	4:05
3.	"Sway"	Luis Demetrio (composer); Norman Gimbel (lyricist)	Michael Bublé (2003)	3:08
4.	"Everything"	Bublé; Chang; Foster-Gillies	Call Me Irresponsible (2007)	3:32
5.	"Me and Mrs. Jones"	Kenny Gamble; Leon Huff; Cary Gilbert	Call Me Irresponsible	4:33
6.	"Home"	Bublé; Chang; Foster-Gillies	It's Time	3:46
7.	"L-O-V-E"	Bert Kaempfert; Milt Gabler	Call Me Irresponsible (various special editions)	2:50
8.	"Cry Me a River"	Arthur Hamilton	Crazy Love	4:15
9.	"Don’t Blame it On Me"	Erik Kertes; Jeremy Silver; Bublé; Nina Woodford	New song	2:48
10.	"Baby (You've Got What It Takes)" (Sharon Jones and the Dap-Kings)	Clyde Otis; Murray Stein	Crazy Love	3:18
11.	"Fever"	Eddie Cooley; John Davenport	Michael Bublé	3:51
12.	"Quando, Quando, Quando" (duet with Nelly Furtado)	Alberto Testa; Pat Boone; Tony Renis	It's Time	4:44
13.	"Save the Last Dance for Me"	Doc Pomus; Mort Shuman	It's Time	3:38
14.	"Bring It On Home to Me"	Sam Cooke	Higher (2022)	4:36
15.	"Moondance"	Van Morrison	Michael Bublé	4:13
16.	"Spider-Man"	Paul Francis Webster; Bob Harris	BaBalu (2001)	3:03
17.	"It’s a Beautiful Day"	Bublé; Chang; Foster-Gillies	To Be Loved (2013)	3:19
18.	"Hold On"	Bublé; Chang; Foster-Gillies	Crazy Love	4:05
19.	"Quizas, Quizas, Quizas"	Osvaldo Farrés	New song	3:12
20.	"Higher"	Bublé; Noah Bublé; Ryan Tedder; Greg Wells	Higher	3:07
21.	"You and I"	Stevie Wonder	It's Time	3:55
Total length:				77:54

== Charts ==
Chart performance for The Best of Bublé
Chart (2024)	Peak position
Austrian Albums (Ö3 Austria)	68
Belgian Albums (Ultratop Flanders)	140
Portuguese Albums (AFP)	60
Scottish Albums (OCC)	53
Spanish Albums (Promusicae)	97
UK Albums (OCC)	53
US Billboard 200	159
US Top Jazz Albums (Billboard)	2

== Certifications ==
Region	Certification	Certified units/sales
United Kingdom (BPI)	Silver	60,000^{‡}
^{‡} Sales+streaming figures based on certification alone.
