= A Taste of Bublé =

EP by Michael Bublé
- Released: April 29, 2008
- Recorded: 2005–2007
- Genre: Vocal, traditional pop
- Length: 15:08
- Label: Reprise
- Producer: Bob Rock

Michael Bublé chronology
With Love (2006)	A Taste of Bublé (2008)	Special Delivery (2010)

A Taste of Bublé is an EP by Canadian artist Michael Bublé, released in the United States on April 29, 2008. The EP was made available as a digital download, and was also available exclusively on CD via Wal-Mart stores. The EP features tracks from one of Bublé's albums, Call Me Irresponsible, 2 tracks from his 2006 EP With Love, and a new remix of the track "Everything".

== Track listing ==
No.	Title	Length
1.	"Stuck in the Middle with You"
2.	"I've Got a Crush on You"
3.	"These Foolish Things (Remind Me Of You)"
4.	"Everything" (i-Soul Remix)

== Release history ==
Region	Date	Label
United States	April 29, 2008	Reprise Records
