= Jason Goldman =

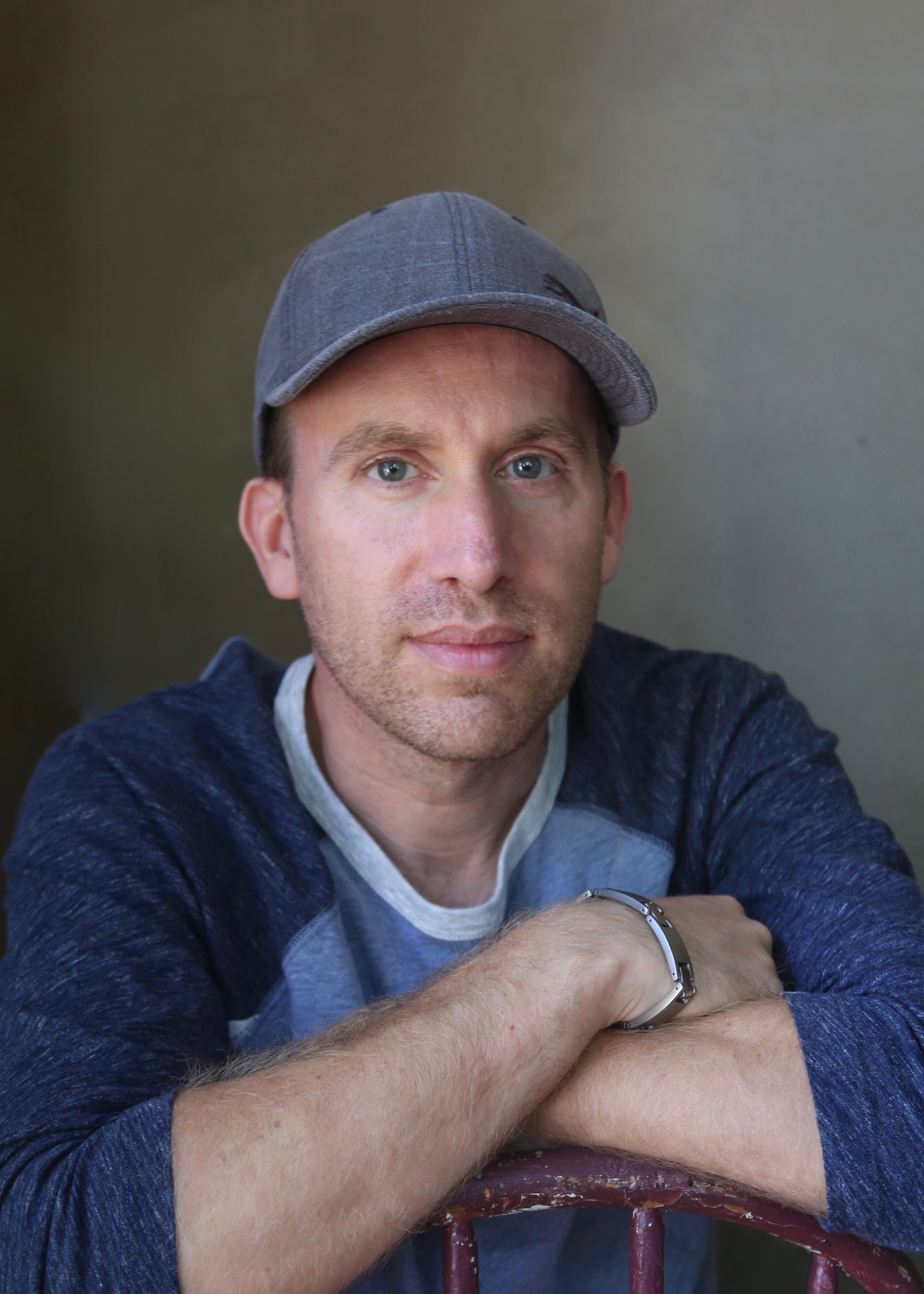

Background information
- Born: Stamford, Connecticut, U.S.
- Genres: Pop, jazz, electronic
- Occupation(s): Record producer, songwriter, arranger, orchestrator, educator, engineer
- Years active: 1999–present
- Website: jasongoldmanmusic.com

Jason "Spicy G" Goldman, is an American music producer, songwriter, arranger, multi-instrumentalist, and educator. Jason has been a producer and writer on Michael Buble's last 4 albums including his most recent 2023 Grammy winning album "Higher" as well as producing Bublé's most recent #1 on Billboard's Adult Contemporary charts for "Let It Snow". Goldman has arranged and orchestrated over a dozen songs on Bublé's multi-platinum albums over the span of the artist's career.

== Early life ==
Goldman grew up in Norwalk, Connecticut, and took up the saxophone at the age of 11 after being inspired by his father, who was an R&B saxophonist in his youth. Goldman attended the Berklee College of Music, concentrating on jazz composition and film scoring. In 1998, he moved to Los Angeles and was selected by Herbie Hancock and Wayne Shorter to be a member of the Thelonious Monk Institute of Jazz. He has performed with Herbie Hancock, Terence Blanchard, Christian McBride, Clark Terry, Jimmy Heath, Roy Haynes, Kenny Barron, and Wayne Shorter.

Goldman received a master's degree from the University of Southern California in 2002, then began teaching there as an adjunct professor and Director of Jazz at the Los Angeles County High School for the Arts.

== Career ==
In 2003, Goldman was selected by record producer David Foster to be the featured saxophonist in Michael Bublé's first touring band. While on Bublé's first global tour, Goldman began writing arrangements for the eight-piece band, including his takes on "Mack the Knife" on Bublé's "Come Fly With Me" DVD (2004) and Charlie Chaplin's "Smile" on the CD/DVD combo Caught in the Act (2005).

Before leaving the band in 2005, Goldman was asked by Foster to arrange "Let It Snow" for Bublé's Radio City Music Hall debut. Goldman's arrangement was released on the platinum selling album Let It Snow in 2007.

Goldman co-produced Michael Bublé's 2016 album Nobody But Me, which debuted on the Billboard Top 200 at No. 2. He arranged and orchestrated the big band songs on the album including "I Wanna Be Around", "My Kind of Girl", and "My Baby Just Cares for Me". He also wrote two songs on the album, "Take You Away" and the lead single "Nobody But Me".

In September 2016, Goldman signed a music publishing deal with Reservoir Publishing.

== Teaching ==
Goldman is a Professor of Practice and Chair of the Jazz Studies department at the University of Southern California, where he has been a faculty member since 2002. He has also been the faculty coordinator for the GRAMMY Museum's GRAMMY Camp since 2008.

== Works ==
In 2012 Goldman was hired by publishing company Radnofsky/Couper to write a jazz improvisation book. The Goldman Method is a systematic approach to jazz improvisation.

== Discography ==
As Leader/Co-Leader

- 2001 – The Definitive Standard
- 2008 – Wave Street Sessions
- 2020 - Hypnotized
- 2022 - There's Only One
- 2024 - Rock & Roll Remedy

As arranger

- 2003 – Come Fly with Me – Michael Bublé
- 2005 – Caught in the Act – Michael Bublé
- 2006 – Let It Snow – Michael Bublé
- 2016 - Tony Bennett Celebrates 90 - Tony Bennett
- 2016 - California Christmas - Jessy J
- 2018 - Love - Michael Bublé
- 2020 - Hypnotized - Jason 'Spicy G' Goldman
- 2022 - Higher - Michael Bublé
- 2022 - There's Only One - Jason 'Spicy G' Goldman & Lia Booth
- 2022 - The Music of a Charlie Brown Christmas - Doc Watkins
- 2022 - California Christmas vol. 2 - Jessy J
- 2024 - The Best of Bublé

As producer/co-producer

- 2016 – Nobody But Me – Michael Bublé
- 2018 - Love - Michael Bublé (Bonus track)
- 2020 - Hypnotized - Jason 'Spicy G' Goldman
- 2021 - Let It Snow (single) Christmas 10th Anniversary - Michael Bublé
- 2022 - Higher - Michael Bublé
- 2022 - There's Only One - Jason 'Spicy G' Goldman & Lia Booth
- 2022 - The Music of a Charlie Brown Christmas - Doc Watkins
- 2024 - The Best of Bublé

Other appearances

- 2011 - Reminiscence - Mann featuring Ty Dolla $ign and Jason Goldman
