= A Holiday Gift for You =

EP by Michael Bublé
- Released: 2010
- Recorded: 2004–2009
- Genres: Vocal, traditional pop
- Length: 15:08
- Label: Reprise
- Producer: Bob Rock

Michael Bublé chronology
Hollywood: The Deluxe EP (2010)	A Holiday Gift for You (2010)

A Holiday Gift for You is an EP by Canadian artist Michael Bublé, released in the United Kingdom on December 1, 2010. The EP was made available as a free download on the iTunes Store, becoming part of a 12 Days of Christmas promotion. The EP features tracks from three of Bublé's albums, More, Call Me Irresponsible and his live album, Michael Bublé Meets Madison Square Garden.

== Track listing ==
No.	Title	Length
1.	"Feeling Good" (Live from Madison Square Garden)	4:43
2.	"Everything" (Live from Madison Square Garden)	3:37
3.	"Mack the Knife"	3:20
4.	"Orange Coloured Sky"	3:28

== Release history ==
Region	Date	Label
United Kingdom	December 1, 2010	Reprise Records
