= Randy Waldman =

American musician (born 1955)

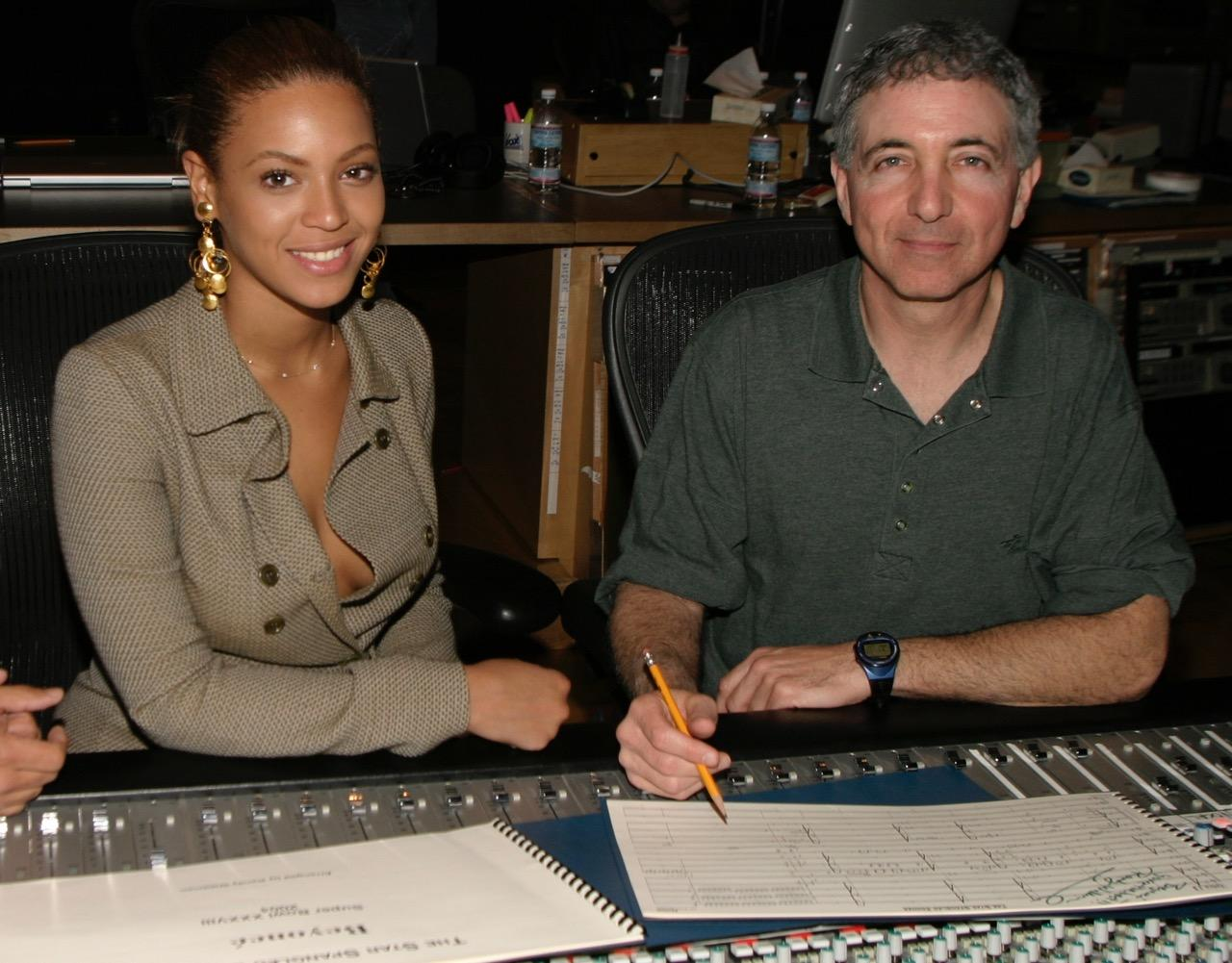
- Waldman with Beyoncé in 2004

Background information
- Born: September 8, 1955 (age 70); Chicago, Illinois, U.S.
- Genres: Jazz; pop
- Occupations: Pianist; arranger; conductor; composer
- Instrument: Piano
- Years active: 1966–present
- Website: jazzpilot.com

Randy Waldman (born September 8, 1955) is an American pianist, arranger, composer, and conductor. He has frequently collaborated with Barbra Streisand, serving as her pianist and conductor since 1984. Waldman has worked with notable artists including Frank Sinatra, Michael Jackson, Whitney Houston, Beyoncé, Ray Charles, and Stevie Wonder. His 2018 album Superheroes garnered the award for Best Arrangement at the 61st Annual Grammy Awards.

Waldman is also a helicopter and airplane instructor, holding a 2003 flight speed record in a Bell OH-58 helicopter.

== Early life ==
Waldman was born in Chicago, Illinois on September 8, 1955. Waldman began playing piano at age five at which time he was considered a child prodigy. He was hired to demonstrate pianos at a local piano store at age 12. While in high school, he performed with the Northwestern University Jazz band.

== Career ==
At the age of 21, Waldman was hired to go on tour as the pianist for Frank Sinatra. He was then hired by The Lettermen to go on tour from Chicago to Los Angeles. After the tour, Waldman relocated to Los Angeles and, within a year, he toured with Minnie Riperton, Lou Rawls, Paul Anka, and George Benson, the last of whom kept Waldman around as his pianist, musical director, and arranger for the following seven years.

Eventually, Waldman began a session career in Los Angeles that would go on to span 40 years. He has performed on hundreds of albums, motion picture soundtracks, television shows, and jingles. In the 1980s, Waldman worked on soundtracks such as Ghostbusters, Romancing the Stone, Back to the Future, Nuts, Beetlejuice, Salsa, Who Framed Roger Rabbit, The Abyss, and Weekend at Bernie's.

Waldman was nominated for a Grammy for Best Vocal Arrangement for "Code of Ethics" from The Manhattan Transfer 1983 album Bodies and Souls. Two years later, Waldman's co-arrangement of the West Side Story song "Somewhere", recorded by Barbra Streisand for The Broadway Album, won a Grammy. Waldman has contributed to many Streisand albums, films, and live concerts.

In the 1990s, Waldman worked on the soundtracks for numerous films including Forrest Gump, The Bodyguard, Mission: Impossible, and Titanic. He also worked with numerous artists over the course of his career including Barbra Streisand, Michael Jackson, Paul McCartney, Patti LaBelle, Celine Dion, Beyoncé, Madonna, Whitney Houston, Olivia Newton-John, Barry Manilow, Ray Charles, The Stylistics, Michael Bublé, Quincy Jones, Johnny Mathis, Stevie Wonder, Andrea Bocelli, John Travolta, Kenny G, Katey Sagal, and others.

Randy Waldman has also left a significant mark on the Japanese music scene with artists such as Tetsuya Komuro, Namie Amuro, and Tomomi Kahara through his string arrangements for various prominent Japanese artists, cementing his legacy as a key figure in enriching Japan’s pop and orchestral soundscape over two decades.

Waldman released Wigged Out, his first solo album, on his own WhirlyBird Records in 1998. Featuring bassist John Pattitucci and drummer Vinnie Colaiuta, the album consisted of a collection of classical songs reworked with jazz arrangements. His second album, UnReel, was released in 2001 and featured a variety of soundtrack and theme music from many different films and television shows. He worked on the soundtrack for Ice Age in 2002 before releasing Timing is Everything in 2003.

Waldman appeared on the 2017 Seal album Standards, featuring the songs of Frank Sinatra. He was also Barbra Streisand's pianist, music director, and conductor for her Barbra: The Music, The Mem'ries, The Magic tour. A filmed version of one of the shows was released on Netflix in November 2017. In September 2018, he released the studio album, Superheroes, with Vinnie Colaiuta on drums and Carlitos Del Puerto on bass. The album also featured guest appearances from artists like Chick Corea, Wynton Marsalis, George Benson, Take 6, Chris Potter, and several others. Waldman's arrangement of the album's "Spiderman Theme" would go on to win the Grammy Award for Best Arrangement, Instrumental and Vocals at the 61st Grammy Awards in 2019. His arrangement of the "Batman Theme" was also nominated for the Grammy Award for Best Arrangement, Instrumental or A Cappella.

== Selected discography ==
=== Studio albums ===
List of studio albums with selected album details
Title	Details
Wigged Out	Released: 1998 (US); Label: WhirlyBird/Concord Jazz; Formats: CD, Vinyl
UnReel	Released: 2001 (US); Label: WhirlyBird/Concord Jazz; Formats: CD, Vinyl
Timing is Everything	Released: 2003 (US); Label: WhirlyBird/Concord Jazz; Formats: CD, Vinyl
Superheroes	Released: September 28, 2018 (US); Label: BFM Jazz; Formats: CD, Vinyl

=== Songwriting, instrumental, and production ===
List of songwriting, instrumental, and production credits on selected albums
Album	Year	Artist	Role	Notes
Lou Rawls Live	1978	Lou Rawls	Keyboards	
Bodies and Souls	1983	The Manhattan Transfer	Piano, synthesizers, instrumental arrangements, composer	He was nominated for a Grammy for Best Vocal Arrangement
Emotion	1984	Barbra Streisand	Synthesizer	US #19
The Broadway Album	1985	Barbra Streisand	Arranger; Keyboards; Synthesizer; Assistant Engineer	US #1, co-arrangement of "Somewhere" won Grammy
20/20	1985	George Benson	Arranger; Keyboards; Synthesizer	US #45
One Voice	1987	Barbra Streisand	Synthesizer	US #9
Bad	1987	Michael Jackson	Synthesizer	US #1
Till I Loved You	1988	Barbra Streisand	Arranger; Piano; Synthesizer; Programming; Drum programming; Rhythm arrangements	US #10
This Christmas	1990	Patti LaBelle	Producer; Engineer; Arranger; Piano; Synthesizer; Drum programming; Vocal arrangement; Composer	
The Comfort Zone	1991	Vanessa Williams	Arranger; Piano; Arrangement preparation; Writer	US #17
Love Remembers	1993	George Benson	Strings; Piano; Keyboards	
My World	1993	Ray Charles	Guitar; Synthesizer	US #145
The Concert	1994	Barbra Streisand	Piano; Synthesizer	US #10
Miracles: The Holiday Album	1994	Kenny G	Piano	US #1
Earth Songs	1995	John Denver	Piano; Synthesizer	
My Cherie	1995	Sheena Easton	Arranger; Keyboards; Programming; Guest artist	
HIStory: Past, Present and Future, Book I	1995	Michael Jackson	Keyboards; Synthesizer	US #1
The Best of George Benson	1995	George Benson	Synthesizer	
Love Brace	1996	Tomomi Kahala	Strings arrangement	JP #1
Sweet 19 Blues	1996	Namie Amuro	Arranger	JP #1
By Myself	1996	Hitomi	Piano	JP #1
Star Bright	1996	Vanessa Williams	Arranger; Piano	US #36
Higher Ground	1997	Barbra Streisand	Piano	US #1
Blood on the Dance Floor: HIStory in the Mix	1997	Michael Jackson	Keyboards; Synthesizer	US #24
Concentration 20	1997	Namie Amuro	Strings arrangement	JP #1
Greatest Hits Volume III	1997	Billy Joel	Keyboards	US #9
The Complete Hits Collection: 1973–1997	1997	Billy Joel	Keyboards	
Storytelling	1997	Tomomi Kahala	Strings arrangement	JP #1
Bathhouse Betty	1998	Bette Midler	Piano; Guest artist	US #32
The Collection	1998	John Denver	Arranger	
The Movie Album: As Time Goes By	1998	Neil Diamond	Keyboards	US #31
SA	1999	Ami Suzuki	Strings arrangement	JP #1
A Love Like Ours	1999	Barbra Streisand	Piano; Keyboards; Guest artist; Synthesizer	US #6
Classics in the Key of G	1999	Kenny G	Piano; Guest artist	US #17
Faith: A Holiday Album	1999	Kenny G	Piano; Guest artist	US #6
Infinity Eighteen Vol. 1	2000	Ami Suzuki	Strings arrangement	JP #1
Timeless: Live in Concert	2000	Barbra Streisand	Arranger; Keyboards; Orchestration	US #21
Les Incontournables	2000	George Benson	Synthesizer; Programming	
The George Benson Anthology	2000	George Benson	Synthesizer	
Mathis on Broadway	2000	Johnny Mathis	Producer; Engineer; Arranger; Guest artist; Piano; Keyboards	
Freedom	2000	Sheena Easton	Producer; Engineer; Arranger; Programming	
Best Ballads	2000	Sheena Easton	Arranger; Keyboards; Programming	
Christmas Memories	2001	Barbra Streisand	Keyboards	US #15
Duets	2002	Barbra Streisand	Arranger	US #38
Paradise	2002	Kenny G	Piano	US #9
Wishes: A Holiday Album	2002	Kenny G	Piano	US #29
The Christmas Album	2002	Johnny Mathis	Piano	US #143
Just Whitney	2002	Whitney Houston	String arrangements; String conductor	US #9
Alejandro Sanz: MTV Unplugged		Alejandro Sanz	Piano	
The Movie Album	2003	Barbra Streisand	Piano; Keyboards	US #5
Michael Bublé	2003	Michael Bublé	Arranger; Piano; Keyboards; Horn arrangements	US #5
Let It Snow	2003	Michael Bublé	Arranger; Keyboards	US #32
The Greatest Hits of All	2003	George Benson	Synthesizer	US #138
Bette Midler Sings the Rosemary Clooney Songbook	2003	Bette Midler	Piano; Harpsichord	US #14
Genius Loves Company	2004	Ray Charles	Arranger; Piano; Keyboards; Rhythm Arrangement	US #1
The Essential Johnny Mathis	2004	Johnny Mathis	Piano	
It's Time	2005	Michael Bublé	Piano	US #7
The Greatest Holiday Classics	2005	Kenny G	Piano; Keyboards; Horn Arrangements	US #39
My Lives	2005	Billy Joel	Keyboards	US #171
With Love	2006	Michael Bublé	Piano	
Givin' It Up	2006	George Benson and Al Jarreau	Piano; Arranger	US #58
Navidades	2006	Luis Miguel	Piano	US #51
I'm in the Mood for Love...The Most Romantic Melodies of All Time	2006	Kenny G	Conductor; Piano; Arranger	US #37
Cool Yule	2006	Bette Midler	Piano; Keyboards	US #33
Amore	2006	Andrea Bocelli	Piano; Keyboards	US #3
Live in Concert 2006	2007	Barbra Streisand	Arranger; Piano; Orchestration	US #7
Call Me Irresponsible	2007	Michael Bublé	Arranger; Keyboards	US #1
King of Pop	2008	Michael Jackson	Keyboards; Synthesizer	
The Collection	2009	Michael Jackson	Synthesizer	
Special Delivery	2010	Michael Bublé	Piano	US #26
What Matters Most	2011	Barbra Streisand	Piano	US #4
Release Me	2012	Barbra Streisand	Piano	US #7
The Classic Christmas Album	2012	Kenny G	Piano	US #128
This Christmas	2012	John Travolta and Olivia Newton-John	Producer; Arranger; Conductor; Mixing; Organ; Piano; Synthesizer bass	US #81
Back to Brooklyn	2013	Barbra Streisand	Keyboards	
Inspiration: A Tribute to Nat King Cole	2013	George Benson	Producer; Conductor; Arranger; Piano; Background vocals	US #89
Love in Portofino	2013	Andrea Bocelli	Keyboards; Piano	US #40
Partners	2014	Barbra Streisand	Piano	US #1
Stages	2015	Josh Groban	Piano	US #2
Stages: Live	2016	Josh Groban	Piano	US #149
Encore: Movie Partners Sing Broadway	2016	Barbra Streisand	Piano	US #1
The Music...The Mem'ries...The Magic!	2017	Barbra Streisand	Music direction; Piano	US #69
Standards	2017	Seal	Piano	

== Nominations and awards ==
Year	Award	Category	Nominee(s)	Result	Ref.
1984	Grammy Award	Best Vocal Arrangement	Arrangement of The Manhattan Transfer's "Code of Ethics"	Nominated	
2019	Grammy Award	Best Arrangement, Instrumental or A Cappella	Arrangement of "Batman Theme" from Waldman's Superheroes	Nominated	
2019	Grammy Award	Best Arrangement, Instrumental and Vocals	Arrangement of "Spiderman Theme" from Waldman's Superheroes	Won	
