= With Love (Michael Bublé EP) =

EP by Michael Bublé
- Released: February 14, 2006
- Genres: Big band; traditional pop
- Length: 32:33
- Labels: 143; Reprise; Hallmark Cards
- Producer: David Foster

Michael Bublé chronology
Caught in the Act (2005)	With Love (2006)	Call Me Irresponsible (2007)

Professional ratings
Review scores
Source	Rating
AllMusic	3.5/5 stars
Billboard	(Favorable)

With Love is an EP released by Canadian jazz performer Michael Bublé. It was released on February 14, 2006 as part of a Valentine's Day promotion, and was exclusively sold in Hallmark Gold Crown stores, under the licensee Hallmark Cards, under license from 143 and Reprise. The album compiles tracks previously released on Michael Bublé (2003), Come Fly with Me (2004), and It's Time (2005), along with two previously unreleased tracks.

== Track listing ==
No.	Title	Writer(s)	Length
1.	"Fever"	Eddie Cooley; John Davenport	3:51
2.	"Try a Little Tenderness"	Jimmy Campbell; Reg Connelly; Harry M. Woods	4:05
3.	"You and I"	Stevie Wonder	3:54
4.	"I've Got a Crush on You"	George Gershwin; Ira Gershwin	3:03
5.	"Can't Help Falling in Love"	Hugo Peretti; Luigi Creatore; George David Weiss	3:49
6.	"My Funny Valentine"	Richard Rodgers; Lorenz Hart	5:15
7.	"These Foolish Things (Remind Me of You)"	Jack Strachey; Holt Marvell	4:37
8.	"That's All"	Alan Brandt; Bob Haymes	3:59
Total length:			32:33

== Certifications ==
Region	Certification	Certified units/sales
United States (RIAA)	Gold	500,000^{^}
^{^} Shipments figures based on certification alone.

== Release history ==
Region	Date	Label
United States	February 14, 2006	Reprise Records / 143 Records
