= Higher (Michael Bublé album) =

Studio album by Michael Bublé
- Released: March 25, 2022
- Genres: Pop; swing
- Length: 47:13
- Label: Reprise
- Producers: Greg Wells; Paul McCartney; Bob Rock; Jason Goldman; Alan Chang

Michael Bublé chronology
Love (2018)	Higher (2022)	The Best of Bublé (2024)

Singles from Higher
- 1. "I'll Never Not Love You" Released: January 28, 2022; 2. "Higher" Released: March 10, 2022

Higher is the eleventh studio album by Canadian singer Michael Bublé, released on March 25, 2022, by Reprise Records. The album won Best Traditional Pop Album at the 2023 Grammy Awards in Los Angeles. Higher includes arrangements of Paul McCartney's ballad "My Valentine", produced by McCartney himself, and Sam Cooke's "Bring It On Home to Me" as well as a collaboration with Willie Nelson on a cover of Nelson's "Crazy".

== Critical reception ==
Professional ratings
Review scores
Source	Rating
AllMusic	4/5 stars
Digital Journal	5/5 stars

Matt Collar from AllMusic gave the album four out of five stars, saying: "His relaxed, kitten-soft voice is a perfect match for the nuanced and sophisticated style of these songs." Markos Papadatos from Digital Journal gave the album five out of five stars, calling it "one of the most captivating albums of his career." Mike Wass from Variety wrote that Bublé "gets to show the full breadth of his talent, while staying true to idols, influences, and, most importantly, himself."

== Commercial performance ==
Higher debuted at number one on UK Albums Chart, becoming Bublé's fifth album to reach the top spot in the country. In Australia, Higher debuted at number two on ARIA Top Albums Chart, becoming his ninth album to reach the second spot. The album also proved to be a success around the world, reaching number one in Scotland and top 10 peaks in New Zealand (No. 2), Ireland (No. 4), the Flanders region of Belgium (No. 8) and Switzerland (No. 9).

== Track listing ==
Higher – Standard edition
No.	Title	Writer(s)	Producer(s)	Length
1.	"I'll Never Not Love You"	Bublé; Michael Pollack	Greg Wells	3:38
2.	"My Valentine"	Paul McCartney	McCartney	3:28
3.	"A Nightingale Sang in Berkeley Square"	Eric Maschwitz; Manning Sherwin	Wells	3:05
4.	"Make You Feel My Love"	Bob Dylan	Bob Rock	3:17
5.	"Baby I'll Wait"	Fraser Churchill; Wells; Jason Reeves; John Mayer; Bublé; Nathan Chapman	Wells	2:23
6.	"Higher"	Bublé; Noah Bublé; Ryan Tedder; Greg Wells	Wells	3:05
7.	"Crazy" (with Willie Nelson)	Nelson	Rock	4:54
8.	"Bring It On Home to Me"	Sam Cooke	Rock	4:35
9.	"Don't Get Around Much Anymore"	Bob Russell; Duke Ellington	Jason "Spicy G" Goldman	3:23
10.	"Mother"	Wells; Jon Bellion; Bublé; Pollack	Wells	3:57
11.	"Don't Take Your Love from Me"	Henry Nemo	Wells	3:56
12.	"You're the First, the Last, My Everything"	Barry White; Peter Radcliffe; Tony Seppe	Wells	3:45
13.	"Smile"	Charlie Chaplin; Geoffrey Parsons; John Turner	Alan Chang	3:47
Total length:				47:13

Higher – European bonus track
No.	Title	Writer(s)	Producer(s)	Length
14.	"Pennies from Heaven"	Arthur Johnston, Johnny Burke	Jason "Spicy G" Goldman	2:42
Total length:				49:55

== Charts ==
Chart performance for Higher
Chart (2022)	Peak position
Australian Albums (ARIA)	2
Austrian Albums (Ö3 Austria)	5
Belgian Albums (Ultratop Flanders)	8
Belgian Albums (Ultratop Wallonia)	16
Canadian Albums (Billboard)	3
Dutch Albums (Album Top 100)	11
French Albums (SNEP)	113
German Albums (Offizielle Top 100)	7
Hungarian Albums (MAHASZ)	1
Irish Albums (Official Charts)	4
Italian Albums (FIMI)	43
New Zealand Albums (RMNZ)	2
Polish Albums (ZPAV)	12
Portuguese Albums (AFP)	3
Scottish Albums (Official Charts)	1
Spanish Albums (PROMUSICAE)	4
Swiss Albums (Schweizer Hitparade)	9
UK Albums (Official Charts)	1
US Billboard 200	12

== Certifications ==
Certifications for Higher
Region	Certification	Certified units/sales
United Kingdom (BPI)	Silver	60,000^{‡}
^{‡} Sales+streaming figures based on certification alone.
