= Quizás, Quizás, Quizás =

1947 song by Cuban songwriter Osvaldo Farrés

Song by Osvaldo Farrés
- Language: Spanish
- English title: Perhaps, Perhaps, Perhaps
- Genre: Popular
- Songwriter: Osvaldo Farrés

"Quizás, quizás, quizás", sometimes known simply as "Quizás" (Latin American Spanish: [kiˈsas]; "Perhaps"), is a popular song by the Cuban songwriter Osvaldo Farrés. Farrés wrote the music and original Spanish lyrics for the song which became a hit for Bobby Capó in 1947.

== English version ==
English lyrics for "Perhaps, Perhaps, Perhaps" were made by Joe Davis from the original Spanish version. That English version was first recorded by Desi Arnaz in 1948 (RCA).

== French version ==
The French lyrics, Qui sait, qui sait, are by Jacques Larue, with a slightly different meaning. The story is about a man wondering if the flirting of his girlfriend while dancing with an unknown man will have impact on their relationship: "Who knows?". It has been first recorded by Luis Mariano in 1948, on a single for His Master's Voice.

== Cover versions ==
Notable cover versions include:

- 1951: Bing Crosby recorded the song with the Bando da Lua on February 5, 1951, for Decca Records.
- 1953: Xavier Cugat
- 1955: Fairuz [in Arabic, titled Murafrif-ud-Dalāli (مرفرف الدلال)]
- 1957: Perez Prado
- 1958: Nat King Cole regularly performed the song. His version appeared on his 1958 album Cole Español and frequently appeared in the 2000 film In the Mood for Love.
- 1958: Caterina Valente
- 1960: Connie Francis, with the A-side Granada. It was released in Spain and both songs reached No. 7 there.
- 1960: The Ames Brothers with orchestra under the direction of Juan Garcia Esquivel
- 1960: Los Panchos recorded a version with Johnny Albino.
- 1963: Cliff Richard and The Shadows on their album When in Spain
- 1964: Celia Cruz
- 1965: Doris Day recorded the English version of the song, released on her album Latin for Lovers. This cover was later used in the 1992 film Strictly Ballroom.
- 1971: Dennis Brown made the English version the opening song of his second studio album If I Follow My Heart
- 1996: Cake covered the English version on their album Fashion Nugget
- 2000: Mari Wilson sang it for the titles of the television series Coupling.
- 2008: Halie Loren released a version on her album They Oughta Write a Song, using the English and Spanish lyrics.
- 2009: The Pussycat Dolls on their album Doll Domination.
- 2010: Gaby Moreno released a single simply titled "Quizás".
- 2013: Andrea Bocelli released a version with Jennifer Lopez.
- 2017: Gregory Porter on his album Nat King Cole & Me.
- 2022: Arthur Hanlon with Debi Nova.
- 2024: Michael Bublé on his album The Best of Bublé.
