= BaBalu =

Studio album by Michael Bublé
- Released: 2001
- Genre: Jazz, easy listening
- Length: 40:53

Michael Bublé chronology
First Dance (1995)	BaBalu (2001)	Dream (2002)

BaBalu is the debut studio album by Canadian singer Michael Bublé. It was released independently by Bublé in 2001.

== Background ==
Bublé stated that his interest in singing jazz and swing standards stems from his listening to old Mills Brothers recordings, as is evident on albums such as BaBalu, where he re-records several Mills Brothers hits, such as "Lazy River". Bublé says, "Although I like rock 'n' roll and modern music, the first time my granddad played me the Mills Brothers, something magical happened. The lyrics were so romantic, so real, the way a song should be for me. It was like seeing my future flash before me. I wanted to be a singer and I knew that this was the music that I wanted to sing." The track "Spiderman Theme" was later remixed by Junkie XL, released as a single and also used in the movie Spider-Man 2. "Spider-Man" is misspelled on the original album packaging, omitting the hyphen.

== Inspiration ==
The title, BaBalu, refers to the Vancouver night club where Bublé regularly performed in the late 1990s before gaining broad recognition outside his home town. The club has since become Doolin's Irish Pub, located on Granville Street at Nelson. The word "Babalu" is a reference to Margarita Lecuona's song "Babalu" popularized by famous Cuban big band singers Miguelito Valdés and Desi Arnaz. It can also be seen, as such, with the character of Ricky Ricardo (played by Desi Arnaz) on the classic TV comedy series I Love Lucy. The word originally refers to "Babalú-ayé", an orisha or deity in the Santería religion. The album title informally written as Babalu is often seen written as BaBalu because on the album art, the second B is also capitalized. The Vancouver night club and lounge, BaBalu, after which the album is named, was also written with the second B capitalized.

== Track listing ==
No.	Title	Writer(s)	Length
1.	"Spiderman Theme"	Bob Harris, Paul Francis Webster	3:01
2.	"You Must Have Been a Beautiful Baby"	Johnny Mercer, Harry Warren	2:43
3.	"You'll Never Know"	Mack Gordon, Harry Warren	4:19
4.	"Lazy River"	Hoagy Carmichael, Sidney Arodin	4:17
5.	"Oh Marie"	Eduardo di Capua, Howard Johnson	2:47
6.	"Can't Help Falling in Love"	Luigi Creatore, Hugo Peretti, George David Weiss	4:38
7.	"Bill Bailey"	Hughie Cannon	3:12
8.	"Buena Sera^{[a]}"	Peter De Rose, Carl Sigman	3:45
9.	"When You're Smiling"	Mark Fisher, Joe Goodwin, Larry Shay	2:45
10.	"What a Wonderful World"	Bob Thiele, George David Weiss	4:16
11.	"Don't Get Around Much Anymore"	Bob Russell, Duke Ellington	2:31
12.	"Mack the Knife"	Bertolt Brecht, Kurt Weill	4:50
13.	"La Vie en Rose"	Louiguy	2:05

== Notes ==
- ^{a} Spelled as "Buena Sera" on the album, the song's official spelling is "Buona Sera".
