= Caught in the Act (Michael Bublé album) =

Live album by Michael Bublé
- Released: November 15, 2005
- Venues: Wiltern Theater (Los Angeles)
- Genres: Vocal jazz; traditional pop
- Length: 87:51 (video); 31:06 (audio)
- Labels: 143; Reprise
- Director: David Horn
- Producers: Mitch Owgang (video); David Foster; Humberto Gatica

Michael Bublé chronology
More (2005)	Caught in the Act (2005)	With Love (2006)

Professional ratings
Review scores
Source	Rating
AllMusic	4/5 stars

Caught in the Act is the second live album released by Canadian jazz singer Michael Bublé on November 15, 2005. It was filmed and recorded at the Wiltern Theater in Los Angeles. The filmed concert aired on PBS as an episode of Great Performances, and the show was subsequently released on DVD along with the audio CD to create the album package, although the audio disc only featured eight of the songs from the concert. In 2009, the video was also released in Blu-ray.

The complete concert will be released in audio formats in April 2026 including several songs not included in the PBS broadcast or the original DVD release. The concert featured a few guest artists, including Laura Pausini and Chris Botti, as well as an unexpected comedic banter with Josh Groban.

== Track listing ==
DVD / Blu-ray
No.	Title	Writer(s)	Length
1.	"Feeling Good"	Leslie Bricusse; Anthony Newley
2.	"Sway"	Norman Gimbel; Pablo Beltrán Ruiz
3.	"Try a Little Tenderness"	James Campbell; Reginald Connelly; Harry M. Woods
4.	"Fever"	Eddie Cooley; John Davenport
5.	"Come Fly with Me"	Sammy Cahn; James Van Housen
6.	"Moondance"	Van Morrison
7.	"You Don't Know Me"	Eddy Arnold; Cindy Walker
8.	"That's All"	Alan Brandt; Bob Haymes
9.	"For Once in My Life"	Orlando Murden; Ronald Miller
10.	"You'll Never Find Another Love like Mine" (duet with Laura Pausini)	Kenneth Gamble; Leon A. Huff
11.	"This Love"	Jesse Carmichael; Ryan Dusick; Adam Levine; Michael Madden; James Valentine
12.	"I've Got You Under My Skin"	Cole Porter
13.	"Home"	Michael Bublé; Amy Foster-Gillies; Alan Chang
14.	"The More I See You"	Mack Gordon; Harry Warren
15.	"Save the Last Dance for Me"	Doc Pomus; Mort Shuman
16.	"How Sweet It Is"	Lamont Dozier; Brian Holland; Eddie Holland
17.	"Crazy Little Thing Called Love"	Freddie Mercury
18.	"Song for You"	Leon Russell
Total length:			87:51

DVD / Blu-ray extras
No.	Title	Writer(s)	Length
1.	"Song for You" (feat. Chris Botti)	Leon Russell
2.	"A Backstage Pass"
Total length:			32:49

CD
No.	Title	Writer(s)	Length
1.	"Feeling Good"	Leslie Bricusse; Anthony Newley	5:06
2.	"Summer Wind"	Hans Bradke; Heinz Meier; Johnny Mercer	4:20
3.	"Home"	Michael Bublé; Amy Foster-Gillies; Alan Chang	3:52
4.	"You and I"	Stevie Wonder	3:48
5.	"The More I See You"	Mack Gordon; Harry Warren	4:03
6.	"You'll Never Find Another Love like Mine" (duet with Laura Pausini)	Kenneth Gamble; Leon A. Huff	3:42
7.	"Can't Buy Me Love"	John Lennon; Paul McCartney	2:29
8.	"Smile"	Charlie Chaplin; Geoffrey Parsons; James Phillips	3:46
Total length:			31:06

== Personnel ==
- Vocals: Michael Bublé
- Musical direction, piano: Alan Chang
- Guitar: Randy Napoleon
- Drums: Robert Perkins
- Bass: Craig Polasko
- Tenor Saxophone: Mark Small
- Alto Saxophone: Robert Wilkerson
- Baritone Saxophone: Frank Basile
- Trombone: Josh Brown
- Trombone: Nick Vagenas
- Trombone: Andrew Lippman
- Lead Trumpet: Jumaane Smith
- Trumpet: Bryan Lipps
- Trumpet: Justin Ray

== Chart positions ==
=== Album ===
Year	Chart	Peak Position
2005	U.S. Billboard 200	82
2005	U.S. Top Jazz Albums	2

Chart (2026)	Peak position
Croatian International Albums (HDU)	10
Hungarian Physical Albums (MAHASZ)	22

== Certifications ==
=== Album ===
Region	Certification	Certified units/sales
Australia (ARIA)	Gold	35,000^{^}
Germany (BVMI)	Gold	100,000^{^}
Italy 2006 sales	—	110,000
Mexico (AMPROFON)	Platinum+Gold	150,000^{^}
Portugal (AFP)	Platinum	20,000^{^}
United Kingdom (BPI)	Gold	100,000^{^}
^{^} Shipments figures based on certification alone.

=== Video ===
Region	Certification	Certified units/sales
Australia (ARIA)	4× Platinum	60,000^{^}
Canada (Music Canada)	8× Platinum	80,000^{^}
Germany (BVMI)	3× Gold	75,000^{^}
United States (RIAA)	4× Platinum	400,000^{^}
^{^} Shipments figures based on certification alone.
