= Michael Bublé Meets Madison Square Garden =

Live album by Michael Bublé
- Released: June 15, 2009
- Genre: Vocal jazz; traditional pop
- Length: 49:07
- Label: 143; Reprise
- Producer: Humberto Gatica

Michael Bublé chronology
Call Me Irresponsible (2007)	Michael Bublé Meets Madison Square Garden (2009)	Crazy Love (2009)

Alternative cover
- Fan Edition

Professional ratings
Review scores
Source	Rating
AllMusic	4/5 stars
Entertainment Weekly	B+

Michael Bublé Meets Madison Square Garden is the third live album released by Canadian singer Michael Bublé. The album features an Audio CD and Live DVD, in the fashion of all of Buble's live albums. The DVD follows the lead-up to what is described as one of the biggest shows of Bublé's career, to be performed at Madison Square Garden in New York City. Bublé visits the Blue Note Club, where he first performed in New York City over six years prior. There is also backstage footage at the Gardens, and footage of Bublé with his family. The DVD was directed and produced by Jason Hehir, on the documentary side, with concert footage directed by Dick Carruthers. The trailer premiered at Bublé's official website. The album released in two primary versions: the standard orange cover edition, and a blue-covered "fan" edition. The latter includes two bonus tracks on both the CD and DVD. The fan edition is not available in stores, and is only available from Bublé's website. It won a Grammy Award on 2010 for Best Traditional Pop Vocal Album At the 52nd Grammy Awards.

== Track listing ==
Disc One (Audio CD)

No.	Title	Writer(s)	Length
1.	"I'm Your Man"	Leonard Cohen	4:28
2.	"Me and Mrs. Jones"	Kenny Gamble, Leon Huff, Cary Gilbert	4:31
3.	"Call Me Irresponsible"	Sammy Cahn, Jimmy Van Heusen	3:03
4.	"I've Got the World on a String"	Harold Arlen, Ted Koehler	3:23
5.	"Lost"	Alan Chang, Jann Arden, Michael Bublé	3:56
6.	"Feeling Good"	Leslie Bricusse, Anthony Newley	4:43
7.	"Home"	Michael Bublé, Alan Chang, Amy Foster-Gillies	4:37
8.	"Everything"	Alan Chang, Amy Foster-Gillies, Michael Bublé	3:37
9.	"Crazy Little Thing Called Love"	Freddie Mercury	5:09
10.	"Song for You"	Leon Russell	6:05

Fan Edition
No.	Title	Writer(s)	Length
1.	"I'm Your Man"
2.	"Sway"	Pablo Beltrán Ruiz, Norman Gimbel	3:34
3.	"Me and Mrs. Jones"
4.	"Call Me Irresponsible"
5.	"I've Got the World on a String"
6.	"Lost"
7.	"Feeling Good"
8.	"Home"
9.	"Everything"
10.	"That's Life"	Dean Kay, Kelly Gordon	5:57
11.	"Crazy Little Thing Called Love"
12.	"Song for You"

Disc Two (DVD)

The DVD features 90 minutes of live performances, backstage footage, and exclusive images. The Fan Edition includes performances of "Stardust" and "You're Nobody till Somebody Loves You".

== Chart positions ==
Chart (2009)	Peak position
Billboard 200	14
Billboard Top Jazz Albums	1
Argentinian Album Chart	5
Austrian Album Chart	47
Belgium Album Chart	75
Denmark Album Chart	29
Dutch Albums Chart	7
Irish Album Chart	5
New Zealand Album Chart	22
Portugal Album Chart	30
Spain Album Chart	37
Swiss Album Chart	67
UK Album Chart	22

== Certifications ==
Region	Certification	Certified units/sales
Brazil (Pro-Música Brasil)	Gold	30,000^{*}
United Kingdom (BPI)	Silver	60,000^{*}
^{*} Sales figures based on certification alone.
