= Totally Bublé =

EP by Michael Bublé
- Released: September 9, 2003
- Genre: Vocal jazz, traditional pop
- Length: 16:40
- Label: DRG Records

Michael Bublé chronology
Michael Bublé (2003)	Totally Bublé (2003)	Let It Snow! (2003)

Alternate cover
- 2008 UK re-release

Professional ratings
Review scores
Source	Rating
AllMusic	2.5/5 stars

Totally Bublé: Original Songs from the Motion Picture Soundtrack Totally Blonde is an EP released by Canadian jazz performer Michael Bublé. The EP features audio and video sections, containing all seven tracks on the EP in both audio and video format featured in the 2001 comedy Totally Blonde, co-starring Bublé.

The EP was recorded in 2001, before Buble had become a well-known artist, but was not released until 2003 following the success of his self-titled debut album. The EP was later re-released as Michael Bublé Sings Totally Blonde in the United Kingdom in 2008.

== Track listing ==
No.	Title	Writer(s)	Length
1.	"That's How It Goes"	Andrew Van Slee; Antony Martin Field; Richard Loring	1:55
2.	"Peroxide Swing"	Andrew Van Slee	2:38
3.	"Me & Mrs. You"	Andrew Van Slee	2:07
4.	"Love At First Sight"	Andrew Van Slee	3:19
5.	"Anyone to Love"	Andrew Van Slee; Antony Martin Field; Richard Loring	2:06
6.	"Guess I'm Falling 4 U"	Andrew Van Slee; Ian Putz	1:49
7.	"Tell Him He's Yours"	Andrew Van Slee	2:06
Total length:			16:40

Bonus material - Michael Bublé videos
No.	Title	Length
1.	"That's How It Goes"
2.	"Love At First Sight"
3.	"Anyone to Love"

UK bonus material - Michael Bublé videos
No.	Title	Length
4.	"Me & Mrs. You"
5.	"Tell Him He's Yours"
6.	"Peroxide Swing"

== Chart positions ==
Chart (2003–2004)	Peak Position
Italian Albums Chart	63
US Billboard Independent Albums	9
