= Michael Bublé (album) =

Studio album by Michael Bublé
- Released: February 11, 2003
- Recorded: October 2002 – January 2003
- Studios: Chartmaker (Malibu, California); Middle Ear (Miami Beach, Florida)
- Genres: Big band; smooth jazz; jazz; traditional pop; adult contemporary
- Length: 48:42
- Labels: 143; Reprise
- Producers: David Foster; Humberto Gatica; Johnny Mandel

Michael Bublé chronology
| Dream (2002) | Michael Bublé (2003) | Totally Bublé (2003) |

Singles from Michael Bublé
- 1. "How Can You Mend a Broken Heart" Released: February 4, 2003; 2. "Kissing a Fool" Released: May 8, 2003; 3. "Sway" Released: June 22, 2004; 4. "Spider-Man Theme" Released: July 26, 2004

Michael Bublé is the third studio album by Canadian singer Michael Bublé. It was released on 143 Records and Reprise Records. The album was released on February 11, 2003, and was Bublé's major label debut. It spawned four singles: "How Can You Mend a Broken Heart", "Kissing a Fool", "Sway" and "Spider-Man Theme".

== Background ==
Bublé's career breakthrough came when he performed Kurt Weill's classic track "Mack the Knife" at the wedding of Brian Mulroney's daughter Caroline in September 2000. Mulroney introduced Bublé to David Foster, a multi-Grammy awarding producer and a Warner Bros. Records executive, who had previously worked with the likes of Josh Groban. Foster signed Bublé to his 143 record label, and he started recording the album in 2001, with David Foster as producer. The album features a range of standards from various eras including "Fever", "The Way You Look Tonight", "For Once in My Life", Van Morrison's "Moondance" and Lou Rawls' "You'll Never Find Another Love Like Mine". Barry Gibb of the Bee Gees performs with Bublé on his version of the group's classic track, "How Can You Mend a Broken Heart".

== Reception ==
Professional ratings
Review scores
| Source | Rating |
|---|---|
| AllMusic | 4/5 stars |

The album was released on February 11, 2003, to worldwide commercial success. The album peaked at No. 8 on the Canadian Albums Chart, as well as peaking at No. 1 in Australia and New Zealand, and achieving 2× platinum status, and No. 47 on the Billboard 200. The album also peaked at No. 6 in the United Kingdom, achieving platinum status. The album was eventually certified 4× platinum in Canada during 2006, 2× Platinum in the United Kingdom during 2007, and 7× Platinum in Australia during 2007. Bublé also won the "Best New Talent" award at the Juno Awards of 2004, and the album itself was nominated for "Album of the Year", only losing out to Sam Roberts.

== Singles ==
"How Can You Mend a Broken Heart", a cover of the original by the Bee Gees, was released as the album's lead single on February 4, 2003. The single was only released in the United States. It managed to reach the top thirty of the Billboard adult contemporary chart. No music video was released for the single.

"Kissing a Fool", a cover of the original by George Michael, was released as the album's second single on May 8, 2003, exclusively in the United States and Japan, also reaching the top thirty of the Billboard adult contemporary chart. No official music video was released for the single, despite strong radio airplay.

"Sway", originally performed by Dean Martin, was released as the album's third single on June 22, 2004. It also reached the top thirty of the adult contemporary chart, while a remix of the song by Junkie XL reached the top twenty in Australia in July 2004. "Moondance" was released alongside "Sway" in Australia.

"Spider-Man Theme" was released as the album's fourth and final single in certain territories, appearing on a special edition of the album released in Italy and other select areas of Europe. The single was most successful in Italy, peaking at No. 2 on the Italian Singles Chart. A re-recorded version was featured in the end credits to Spider-Man 2.

== Track listing ==
Standard edition
| No. | Title | Writer(s) | Length |
|---|---|---|---|
| 1. | "Fever" | Eddie Cooley; John Davenport | 3:51 |
| 2. | "Moondance" | Van Morrison | 4:13 |
| 3. | "Kissing a Fool" | George Michael | 4:34 |
| 4. | "For Once in My Life" | Ron Miller; Orlando Murden | 2:32 |
| 5. | "How Can You Mend a Broken Heart" (featuring Barry Gibb) | Barry Gibb; Robin Gibb | 3:54 |
| 6. | "Summer Wind" | Heinz Meier; Johnny Mercer | 2:55 |
| 7. | "You'll Never Find Another Love like Mine" | Kenneth Gamble; Leon A. Huff | 4:04 |
| 8. | "Crazy Little Thing Called Love" | Freddie Mercury | 3:09 |
| 9. | "Put Your Head on My Shoulder" | Paul Anka | 4:26 |
| 10. | "Sway" | Pablo Beltrán Ruiz; Norman Gimbel | 3:08 |
| 11. | "The Way You Look Tonight" | Jerome Kern; Dorothy Fields | 4:37 |
| 12. | "Come Fly with Me" | Jimmy Van Heusen; Sammy Cahn | 3:20 |
| 13. | "That's All" | Alan Brandt; Bob Haymes | 3:59 |
| Total length: | | | 48:42 |

All editions enhanced content
| No. | Title | Length |
|---|---|---|
| 1. | "Behind-the-scenes footage" (video) |

Japanese edition
| No. | Title | Writer(s) | Length |
|---|---|---|---|
| 14. | "Can't Help Falling in Love" | George David Weiss, Hugo Peretti, Luigi Creatore | 3:49 |
| Total length: | | | 52:31 |

Australian deluxe special edition bonus CD
| No. | Title | Writer(s) | Length |
|---|---|---|---|
| 1. | "Sway" (Junkie XL Remix) | Pablo Beltrán Ruiz, Norman Gimbel | 3:09 |
| 2. | "Sway" (Acoustic Mix) | Pablo Beltrán Ruiz, Norman Gimbel | 3:08 |
| 3. | "Moondance" (Live Mix) | Van Morrison | 3:55 |
| Total length: | | | 10:12 |

Special fan edition / Christmas limited edition bonus EP: Let It Snow
| No. | Title | Writer(s) | Length |
|---|---|---|---|
| 1. | "Let It Snow! Let It Snow! Let It Snow!" | Sammy Cahn, Jule Styne | 2:05 |
| 2. | "The Christmas Song" | Mel Torme, Robert Wells | 4:15 |
| 3. | "Grown Up Christmas List" | David Foster, Linda Thompson | 3:41 |
| 4. | "I'll Be Home for Christmas" | Walter Kent, Kim Gannon, Buck Ram | 3:39 |
| 5. | "White Christmas" | Irving Berlin | 3:59 |
| Total length: | | | 17:39 |

== Personnel ==
=== Musicians ===
- Michael Bublé – vocals
- Mike Melvoin – acoustic piano (1)
- Jochem van der Sagg – programming (1)
- Randy Waldman – acoustic piano (2, 4, 6, 8, 9, 10, 12, 13), keyboards (10)
- David Foster – acoustic piano (3, 5, 7, 11), bass (5), synth bass (8, 10), strings (10)
- Neil Devor – synthesizer programming (3, 5, 7, 8, 10)
- Felipe Elgueta – synthesizer programming (10)
- Michael Thompson – guitars (1), electric guitar (9)
- Dean Parks – guitars (2, 8), acoustic guitar (5, 9), electric guitar (5), percussion (10)
- John Pisano – guitars (6, 13)
- Heitor Pereira – guitars (7), acoustic guitar (11)
- Brian Bromberg – bass (1–4, 6, 7, 9, 11, 12, 13)
- Dave Tull – drums (1–4)
- Vinnie Colaiuta – drums (3, 5, 7, 8, 10, 11)
- Joe LaBarbera – drums (9, 12)
- Frank Capp – drums (6, 13)
- Rafael Padilla – percussion (1, 3, 5, 6, 7, 11)
- Bob Sheppard – saxophone solo (6)
- David Boruff – saxophones (12)
- Gary Grant – trumpet solo (2)
- Barry Gibb – backing vocals (5)
- Sherree Ford – vocals (7)

Arrangements

- David Foster – arrangements (1, 2, 3, 5, 7–11), string arrangements (1), horn arrangements (10)
- Bill Holman – arrangements (1)
- Chris Boardman – string arrangements (1)
- John Clayton – arrangements (2)
- Mike Melvoin – arrangements (3)
- Don Costa – arrangements (4)
- Johnny Mandel – arrangements (6, 13)
- William Ross – string arrangements (7, 9, 11)
- Michael Bublé – horn arrangements (8, 10)
- Don Sebesky – horn arrangements (8)
- Randy Waldman – arrangements (9), horn arrangements (10)
- Billy May – orchestrations (12)
- Sammy Nestico – re-orchestrations (12)

=== Production ===
- David Foster – producer
- Humberto Gatica – producer, engineer, mixing
- Johnny Mandel – producer (6, 13)
- Chris Brooke – assistant engineer
- Neil Devor – assistant engineer (1–11, 13), additional Pro Tools engineer, engineer (12), production coordinator
- Alejandro Rodriguez – assistant engineer (1–11, 13), engineer (12)
- Dave Reitzas – guitar engineer (2, 5, 8, 9), engineer (12)
- Nick Marshall – assistant guitar engineer (2, 5, 8, 9), assistant engineer (12)
- Jon Merchant – vocal recording (Barry Gibb's vocals on 5)
- Joe Wolmuth – Pro Tools mixing engineer
- Kevin Guarnieri – additional Pro Tools engineer
- Christian Robles – additional Pro Tools engineer
- Vlado Meller – mastering
- Greta Detrick – production assistant
- Kathy Frangetis – production assistant
- Mick Haggerty – art direction, design, package photography
- Stephen Danelian – cover photography, package photography
- Zak Jenkinson – grooming

Studios

- Recorded and Mixed at Chartmaker Studios (Malibu, California).
- Barry Gibb vocals recorded at Middle Ear Studios (Miami, Florida).
- Orchestra recorded at Westlake Audio, Signet Sound Studios and Warner Bros. Recording Studios (Los Angeles, California); Paramount Recording Studios (Hollywood, California).
- Mastered at Sony Music Studios (New York City, New York).

== Charts ==
=== Weekly charts ===
| Chart (2003–2005) | Peak position |
|---|---|
| Australian Albums (ARIA) | 1 |
| Belgian Albums (Ultratop Flanders) | 40 |
| Danish Albums (Hitlisten) | 24 |
| Dutch Albums (Album Top 100) | 32 |
| French Albums (SNEP) | 66 |
| German Albums (Offizielle Top 100) | 49 |
| Irish Albums (IRMA) | 8 |
| Italian Albums (FIMI) | 2 |
| New Zealand Albums (RMNZ) | 1 |
| Scottish Albums (Official Charts) | 7 |
| Singaporean Albums (RIAS) | 1 |
| Spanish Albums (Promusicae) | 13 |
| Swedish Albums (Sverigetopplistan) | 28 |
| Swiss Albums (Schweizer Hitparade) | 53 |
| UK Albums (Official Charts) | 6 |
| US Billboard 200 | 47 |

=== Year-end charts ===
| Chart (2003) | Position |
|---|---|
| Australian Albums (ARIA) | 33 |
| New Zealand Albums (RMNZ) | 29 |
| UK Albums (OCC) | 36 |

| Chart (2004) | Position |
|---|---|
| Australian Albums (ARIA) | 8 |
| UK Albums (OCC) | 151 |
| US Billboard 200 | 174 |

| Chart (2005) | Position |
|---|---|
| Australian Albums (ARIA) | 28 |

=== Decade-end charts ===
| Chart (2000–2009) | Position |
|---|---|
| Australian Albums (ARIA) | 12 |

== Sales and certifications ==
| Region | Certification | Certified units/sales |
|---|---|---|
| Australia (ARIA) | 7× Platinum | 490,000^{^} |
| Canada (Music Canada) | 4× Platinum | 400,000^{^} |
| Denmark (IFPI Danmark) | Platinum | 20,000^{‡} |
| Italy (FIMI) | 4× Platinum | 400,000^{*} |
| Italy (FIMI) sales since 2009 | Gold | 25,000^{‡} |
| New Zealand (RMNZ) | 2× Platinum | 30,000^{^} |
| Poland (ZPAV) | Platinum | 40,000^{*} |
| Spain (Promusicae) | Gold | 50,000^{^} |
| United Kingdom (BPI) | 2× Platinum | 600,000^{^} |
| United States (RIAA) | Platinum | 1,000,000^{^} |
^{*} Sales figures based on certification alone.^{^} Shipments figures based on certification alone.^{‡} Sales+streaming figures based on certification alone.
