= I've Got a Crush on You =

Song composed by George and Ira Gershwin

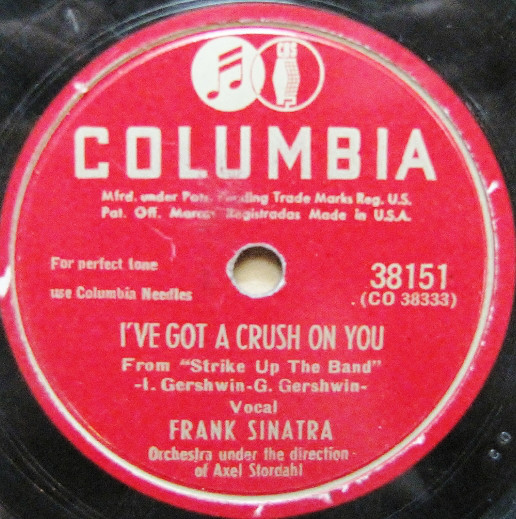
- Disc label of Frank Sinatra recording

Song
- Published: 1930 by New World Music
- Composer: George Gershwin
- Lyricist: Ira Gershwin

"I've Got a Crush on You" is a song composed by George Gershwin with lyrics by Ira Gershwin. While several Gershwin songs were dropped during tryouts and used in later shows, this one is unusual in being heard in two Broadway productions, first in Treasure Girl (1928), introduced by Clifton Webb and Mary Hay (it replaced "Good-Bye to the Old Love," which was used in tryouts). After the disappointing run of that show had concluded, the song was used in the revised version of Strike Up the Band (1930), sung by Doris Carson and Gordon Smith. It was first published in 1930 as part of Strike Up the Band. It was later included in the tribute musical Nice Work If You Can Get It (2012), in which it was sung by Jennifer Laura Thompson.

In 2026, the song entered the public domain alongside all other works that entered the public domain that year.

According to Howard Pollack, the song "did not gain wide popularity until 1939, when Lee Wiley recorded it as a ballad rather than as an 'Allegretto giocoso' dance number." It is now considered a jazz standard, primarily of the vocal repertoire, thanks to recordings by singers such as Frank Sinatra when he was part of Columbia Records, Sarah Vaughan, and Ella Fitzgerald. Instrumental versions have also been recorded by Nat Adderley, Ike Quebec, and others.

== Notable recordings ==
- Lee Wiley, recorded on November 15, 1939 for Liberty Music Shop Records. She recorded it again in 1950 and it was included in her album Night in Manhattan.
- Joe Sullivan's Cafe Society Orchestra (vocal: Helen Ward), which charted briefly in October 1940 in the No. 24 spot.
- Sarah Vaughan, recorded on July 18, 1946 for Musicraft Records (catalog No. 505). She recorded the song again in 1957 for the album Sarah Vaughan Sings George Gershwin and in 1982 with Michael Tilson Thomas for Gershwin Live!.
- Frank Sinatra, recorded November 5, 1947 with Bobby Hackett on trumpet for Columbia Records, which charted briefly in 1948. Sinatra recorded the song again for his 1960 album Nice 'n' Easy.
- Ella Fitzgerald, for Ella Sings Gershwin (1950), Ella Fitzgerald Sings the George and Ira Gershwin Song Book (1959), and with André Previn for Nice Work If You Can Get It (1983).
- Gene Kelly, an outtake from the film An American in Paris (1951).
- Bing Crosby recorded the song in 1956 for use on his radio show and it was subsequently included in the box set The Bing Crosby CBS Radio Recordings (1954–56) issued by Mosaic Records (catalog MD7-245) in 2009.
- Dinah Washington for her album In the Land of Hi-Fi (1956).
- Nat Adderley, for Work Song (1960).
- Anna Maria Alberghetti, for her album I Can't Resist You (1957).
- Sammy Davis Jr., for his album Mood to Be Wooed (1958).
- Julie London, for her album Nice Girls Don't Stay for Breakfast (1967).
- Rosemary Clooney, for Everything's Coming Up Rosie (1977) and for the album Gershwin 100 (1998).
- Cleo Laine, for her album That Old Feeling (1987).
- Linda Ronstadt, for the album What's New (1983), having previously performed the song on a 1980 episode of The Muppet Show.
- Carol Sloane, for But Not For Me (1986)
- Barbra Streisand with Frank Sinatra, for his album Duets (1993)
- Carly Simon, for the album The Glory of Gershwin (1994)
- Keely Smith, for her album Keely Sings Sinatra (2001).
- Rod Stewart with Diana Ross, for his album Thanks for the Memory: The Great American Songbook, Volume IV (2005).
- Steve Tyrell, for his album This Guy's in Love (2003).
- Chris Connor, for her album Chris Connor Sings the George Gershwin Almanac of Song (1957).
- June Christy with the Johnny Guarnieri Quintet, for A Friendly Session, Vol. 1 (1998).
- Stacey Kent, for Dreamsville (2000).
- Michael Bublé, for the EP With Love (2006).
- Brian Wilson, for Brian Wilson Reimagines Gershwin (2010).
- Luscious Jackson, for Red Hot + Rhapsody (1998).
- Michael Feinstein, for his album The Sinatra Project (2008).
- Darius de Haas and Steven Blier, for Quiet Please (2010).
- Uri Caine, for Rhapsody in Blue (2013).
- Kristin Chenoweth, for her album The Art of Elegance (2016).

== Film appearances ==
- 1951 Meet Danny Wilson - sung by Frank Sinatra.
- 1951 An American in Paris - played as background music. It had been recorded for the film by Gene Kelly but it was omitted from the released print.
- 1955 Three for the Show - performed by Betty Grable and Jack Lemmon.
- 1957 The Helen Morgan Story
- 1974 Alice Doesn't Live Here Anymore - performed by Ellen Burstyn.
- 1977 The Choirboys - sung by Vic Tayback.
- 1979 Featured in Woody Allen's Manhattan which was scored exclusively with Gershwin music. Performed by The New York Philharmonic.
- 1984 Bulaklak sa City Jail - sung by Nora Aunor
- 2003 Mona Lisa Smile - performed by Seal.
- 2003 Something's Gotta Give - sung by Steve Tyrell.
- 2008 Definitely, Maybe - the song was performed by actress Rachel Weisz as her character's favorite song
