= Jimmy Campbell (musician) =

British singer-songwriter

Jimmy Campbell (4 January 1944, Kirkby, Liverpool – 12 February 2007, Liverpool) was an English musician and songwriter from Liverpool, England. He was a member of Merseybeat groups The Kirkbys, The 23rd Turnoff, and Rockin' Horse, as well as releasing three solo albums.

== Career ==
Campbell started in music at school, forming the band The Panthers. They supported The Beatles in January 1962. The band performed at The Cavern on numerous occasions, and one show, broadcast on Radio Luxembourg, saw them introduced as The Kirkbys by Bob Wooler, the presenter of the show, 'Sunday Night at the Cavern.' Wooler felt that changing the name of the group to that of their home town would help expand its fan base. The name stuck, and the group released a single, "It's A Crime", in 1966, at the tail end of the Merseybeat era.

Campbell moved on from the Mersey sound to the newly evolving psychedelic scene, renaming the band to The 23rd Turnoff. The name was taken from the motorway sign indicating the nearby M6 exit. Here he found his Liverpool roots placed him at a disadvantage, with the scene establishing itself in London. Described by Bob Stanley of The Times as "the era's lost songwriter", Campbell wrote a number of songs recorded by other artists. Cliff Richard, Billy Fury, The Swinging Blue Jeans and Rolf Harris all covered songs of Campbell's. Although Campbell did not achieve acclaim in the 1960s and 1970s, his work later came to be well regarded, with Will Sergeant naming Campbell's single "Michael Angelo", recorded with 23rd Turnoff among his top ten psychedelic records. The Guardian included the 2004 compilation album, The Dream of Michelangelo, in its list of 1000 Albums to Hear Before You Die.

== Discography ==
=== With The Kirkbys ===
Singles

- "'Cos My Baby's Gone" / "She'll Get No Lovin' That Way" (1965 / 7" single / RCA FAS 947 (Finland))
- "Don't You Want Me No More" / "Bless You" (1965 / 7" single / RCA FAS 948 (Finland))
- "It's A Crime" / "I've Never Been So Much in Love" (1966 / 7" single / RCA 1542)

=== With The 23rd Turnoff ===
Singles

- "Michael Angelo" / "Leave Me Here" (1967 / 7" single / Deram DM 150)

=== As Jimmy Campbell ===
Singles

- "On a Monday" / "Dear Marge" (1969 / 7" single / Fontana TF 1009)
- "Lyanna" / "Frankie Joe" (1970 / 7" single / Fontana TF 1076)
- "Don't Leave Me Now" / "So Lonely Without You" (1970 / 7" single / Fontana 6007 025)

Albums

- Son of Anastasia (April 1969 / LP / Fontana STL 5508)
- Half Baked (1970 / LP / Vertigo 6360 010)
- Jimmy Campbell's Album (1972 / LP / Philips 6308 100)

=== With Rockin' Horse ===
Singles

- "Biggest Gossip in Town" / "You Say" (1971 / 7" single / Philips 6006 156)
- "Stayed Out Late Last Night" / "Julian The Hooligan" (1971 / 7" single / Philips 6006 200)
- (as Atlantis) "I Ain't Got Time" / "Teddy Boyd's Rock 'N' Roll Show" (1972 / 7" single / Fury FY 302)

Supported Chuck Berry on a German TV music special called Beat Club on 29 January 1972 – Post re this performance via 'Colouring the Past'

Albums

- Yes It Is (1971 / LP / Philips 6308 075)

=== Compilation albums ===
- The Vertigo Annual, (Track 3: "Half Baked", 1970 / LP / Vertigo 6657 001)
- Heads Together, First Round (Track 3: "Lonely Norman", 1971 / LP / Vertigo 6360 045)
