= Lost (Michael Bublé song) =

Single by Michael Bublé

from the album Call Me Irresponsible
- B-side: "That's Life"
- Released: November 12, 2007
- Recorded: 2006
- Genre: Traditional pop
- Length: 3:27 (Radio Edit); 3:41 (Album Version)
- Label: 143 Records, Reprise
- Songwriters: Michael Bublé, Jann Arden, Alan Chang, Amy Foster-Gilles
- Producers: David Foster, Humberto Gatica

Michael Bublé singles chronology
"Me and Mrs. Jones" (2007)	"Lost" (2007)	"It Had Better Be Tonight" (2007)

Music video
- "Lost" on YouTube

"Lost" is a song by Canadian-Italian crooner Michael Bublé, released as third single from his third studio album, Call Me Irresponsible. The song was inspired by the breakup with his former fiancée Debbie Timuss. The song was released as a single on November 12, 2007.

== Background ==
In promotion of the single, Bublé performed the song on The X Factor on December 8, 2007. The song was also featured in the sixth season of American police procedural drama NCIS. It featured in a scene in the episode "Heartland", in which Agent Gibbs leaves the town of Stillwater while recalling how he met his first wife. The song was later covered by Jann Arden, a co-writer of the song, for her album Free. The song was a moderate success worldwide. In Canada, the song peaked at #25, while in the United States, "Lost" peaked at #97, making it Michael's third highest entrance in the chart. It also had fair success in the United Kingdom, where it peaked at #19. In Norway, the song peaked at #14. "Lost" was later nominated for a Juno award in 2009.

== Music video ==
A music video accompanied the release of the single, which features Bublé listening through the walls of an apartment and hearing the people behind them. The video was directed by Andrew MacNaughtan.

== Track listing ==
- UK CD single #1
1. "Lost" (International Pop Mix) - 3:27
2. "Lost" (Music Video) - 3:40
- UK CD single #2
1. "Lost" (Album Version) - 3:40
2. "That's Life" - 4:05
3. "Wonderful Tonight" (featuring Ivan Lins) - 4:13

== Chart performance ==
=== Weekly charts ===
Chart (2007–08)	Peak position
Canada Hot 100 (Billboard)	25
Ireland (IRMA)	24
Italy (FIMI)	15
Norway	14
Polish Singles Chart	70
UK Singles (OCC)	19
US Billboard Hot 100	97
US Adult Contemporary (Billboard)	2

=== Year-end charts ===
Chart (2008)	Position
Canada AC (Billboard)	1
US Adult Contemporary (Billboard)	9
