= Come Fly with Me (Michael Bublé album) =

Live album by Michael Bublé
- Released: March 30, 2004
- Recorded: Summer 2003
- Genre: Soul; jazz
- Length: 73:00 (DVD); 30:45 (CD)
- Label: 143; Reprise; WEA International
- Director: Peter Kagan
- Producer: David Foster

Michael Bublé chronology
Let It Snow! (2003)	Come Fly with Me (2004)	It's Time (2005)

Come Fly with Me is the first live album by Canadian singer Michael Bublé released on March 8, 2004. It features songs from Buble's live performances in 2003.

The album consists of an audio CD with eight songs, including two new studio recordings: "Nice 'n' Easy" and "Can't Help Falling in Love".

The video consists of a live in-concert DVD featuring 12 songs recorded during his first worldwide tour. The video of the live performances reached the top 10 of the Billboard Music Video DVD charts of early May 2004. The album made the top 100 of the Billboard Top 200 and has also made the top 50 at the Australian Top 100 Albums Chart. The album rose to #4 on the chart, while Buble's self-titled album peaked at #3, both in the same week. Come Fly With Me was certified gold by ARIA (Australian Charts) in 2006.

== Track listing ==
DVD
No.	Title	Writer(s)	Length
1.	"Come Fly with Me"	Sammy Cahn; James Van Housen
2.	"For Once in My Life"	Orlando Murden; Ronald Miller
3.	"You'll Never Know"	Mack Gordon; Harry Warren
4.	"Kissing a Fool"	George Michael
5.	"Sway"	Norman Gimbel; Pablo Beltrán Ruiz
6.	"Mack the Knife"	Marc Blitzstein; Eugen Berthold Brecht; Kurt Weill
7.	"That's All"	Alan Brandt; Bob Haymes
8.	"Fever"	Eddie Cooley; John Davenport
9.	"How Can You Mend a Broken Heart"	Barry Gibb; Robin Gibb
10.	"The Way You Look Tonight"	Dorothy Fields; Jerome Kern
11.	"Moondance"	Van Morrison
12.	"My Funny Valentine"	Lorenz Hart; Richard Rodgers
Total length:			63:06

DVD: Bonus extra video content
No.	Title	Writer(s)	Length
1.	"The Way You Look Tonight" (Sessions@AOL)	Dorothy Fields; Jerome Kern
2.	"For Once In My Life" (Sessions@AOL)	Orlando Murden; Ronald Miller
3.	"Kissing a Fool" (Sessions@AOL)	George Michael
Total length:			73:00

CD
No.	Title	Writer(s)	Producer(s)	Length
1.	"Nice 'n' Easy" (studio)	Alan Bergman; Marilyn Keith; Lew Spence	David Foster; Humberto Gatica	3:02
2.	"Can't Help Falling in Love" (studio)	Luigi Creatore; Hugo Peretti; George David Weiss	David Foster; Humberto Gatica	3:49
3.	"My Funny Valentine" (live)	Lorenz Hart; Richard Rodgers	David Foster	5:15
4.	"Mack the Knife" (live)	Marc Blitzstein; Eugen Berthold Brecht; Kurt Weill	David Foster	3:25
5.	"Fever" (live)	Eddie Cooley; John Davenport	David Foster	4:07
6.	"You'll Never Know" (live)	Mack Gordon; Harry Warren	David Foster	4:31
7.	"For Once In My Life" (live)	Orlando Murden; Ronald Miller	David Foster	2:43
8.	"Moondance" (live)	Van Morrison	David Foster	3:53
Total length:				30:45

== Charts ==
=== Weekly charts ===
Chart (2004–05)	Peak position
Australian Albums (ARIA)	18
Belgian Albums (Ultratop Wallonia)	84
Dutch Albums (Album Top 100)	40
Italian Albums (FIMI)	49
Scottish Albums (OCC)	54
UK Albums (OCC)	52
US Billboard 200	55

=== Year-end charts ===
Chart (2004)	Position
Australian Albums (ARIA)	99

== Certifications ==
Region	Certification	Certified units/sales
Australia (ARIA) Album certification	Gold	35,000^{^}
Canada (Music Canada) Video certification	3× Platinum	30,000^{^}
United Kingdom (BPI) Album certification	Gold	100,000^{^}
United States (RIAA) Video certification	Platinum	100,000^{^}
^{^} Shipments figures based on certification alone.
