= More (Michael Bublé EP) =

EP by Michael Bublé
- Released: June 26, 2005
- Recorded: 2003
- Genre: Vocal jazz; traditional pop
- Length: 20:28
- Label: Reprise
- Producer: Bob Rock

Michael Bublé chronology
It's Time (2005)	More (2005)	Caught in the Act (2005)

More is an EP by Canadian artist Michael Bublé, released in the United States on June 26, 2005. The EP was made available as a digital download, and was available exclusively on CD via Target stores. The EP includes six tracks, including two unreleased live tracks, plus four tracks only included on the fan club edition of Buble's second studio album, It's Time (2005).

== Track listing ==
No.	Title	Writer(s)	Length
1.	"You'll Never Know" (live)	Harry Warren; Mack Gordon	3:23
2.	"My Funny Valentine" (live)	Richard Rodgers; Lorenz Hart	4:24
3.	"Nice 'n' Easy"	Alan Bergman; Marilyn Keith; Lew Spence	2:45
4.	"Mack the Knife"	Marc Blitzstein; Bertolt Brecht; Kurt Weill	3:20
5.	"I'm Beginning to See the Light"	Duke Ellington; Don George; Johnny Hodges; Harry James	2:49
6.	"Softly, as I Leave You"	Antonio De Vita; Hal Shaper	3:47
Total length:			20:28

== Release history ==
Region	Date	Label
United States	June 26, 2005	Reprise Records
