= It's Time (Michael Bublé album) =

Studio album by Michael Bublé
- Released: February 8, 2005
- Recorded: October 2004 – January 2005
- Studio: Chartmaker, Malibu; Capitol, Hollywood; Henson, Hollywood; Paramount; Record Plant, Los Angeles; Signet Sound; Village Recorder, Los Angeles; Warner Bros. Sound Stage
- Genre: Vocal jazz; traditional pop
- Length: 49:11
- Label: 143; Reprise
- Producer: David Foster; Humberto Gatica; Tommy LiPuma

Michael Bublé chronology
Come Fly with Me (2004)	It's Time (2005)	More (2005)

Singles from It's Time
- 1. "Home" Released: January 24, 2005; 2. "Feeling Good" Released: April 4, 2005; 3. "Home" / "Song for You" Released: November 14, 2005; 4. "Save the Last Dance for Me" Released: April 4, 2006

It's Time is the fourth studio album by Canadian singer Michael Bublé. It was released on February 8, 2005, by 143 Records and Reprise Records. With arrangements by David Foster, the album contains cover versions of songs from traditional contemporary pop: George Gershwin, Cole Porter, Stevie Wonder, and The Beatles, as well as the original song "Home", which was co-written by Bublé.

Despite some unfavorable reviews, the album was a commercial success, topping the charts in Canada, Italy, and Spain, while peaking in the top ten in eleven other countries. The Recording Industry Association of America (RIAA) certified it three-times platinum, for shipments of three million copies across the United States. In Australia, the album was certified five times Platinum by the Australian Recording Industry Association (ARIA) for sales of 350,000 copies sold, and in Canada it was certified six times Platinum by the Canadian Recording Industry Association (CRIA) for sales of 600,000 copies.

== Singles ==
In the U.S., "Home" reached No. 72 on the Billboard Hot 100 chart, while topping the Adult Contemporary chart. It also reached the top forty on the Adult Pop Songs and Digital Songs charts.

"Home" peaked at No. 35 in Australia, No. 31 in the UK, and No. 1 in ten countries.

Bublé credits the success of It's Time, which sold six million copies by 2011, to "Home." It was the most played song on Canadian radio in 2006. It's Time sold well in Japan, Italy, and Australia, and charted in the top ten singles in both the U.K. and U.S. charts. Bublé said that during the recording of It's Time he "came into [his] own as a songwriter" and hearing his own song on the radio made him feel "like a true artist." He acknowledged that a downside to producing covers of well-loved songs is that people often compare them to the original; in writing his own song, he says, he found a sense of freedom. Bublé feels that the song is distinct in comparison to the other songs on the album because of its "country-pop twang" and more-relatable lyrics. The song was written collaboratively with Amy Foster-Gillies, Nashville native and daughter of successful Canadian musician David Foster. In his 2011 autobiography, Onstage Offstage, Bublé states that then-girlfriend Debbie Timuss was his inspiration for the song. Timuss sang backing vocals on "Home" and appeared in the music video, which was filmed in the Orpheum Theater in Vancouver, Canada. "Home" won the 2006 Juno Award for single of the year. A cover version was recorded by American country singer Blake Shelton. Shelton's version of Bublé's song landed him top of the charts for R&R Singles Chart and MediaBase Singles. Shelton was quoted in saying," I loved 'Home' the first time I heard it, and I really love it now," said Shelton. "I'm glad I'm not the only one that thought it was a country song. I've had the honor of performing 'Home' with Michael Bublé on a couple of occasions and can honestly say he is a really great guy, and I think as a writer he's probably pretty excited that it's reached number one, too."

Bublé attributes the song's popularity to its universal theme, stating that "[w]e all know what it's like to be homesick. It's one of the worst feelings. I know about that as well as anybody." "Home" was also featured on the soundtrack of the 2005 American romantic comedy The Wedding Date along with other Bublé songs.

=== Other singles ===
"Feeling Good" was released as the first international single from the album on April 4, 2005. Although the single failed to chart in the United States, it managed to chart on the Austria Singles Chart at No. 66 and on the Dutch Singles Chart at No.62. It also charted in the United Kingdom, peaking at No. 69.

== Critical reception ==
Professional ratings
Review scores
Source	Rating
AllMusic	4/5 stars
All About Jazz	(favorable)
Daily Emerald	(mixed)
The Guardian	2/5 stars

The album received mixed reviews from contemporary music critics, with positive attention given to Bublé's vocals. Aaron Latham of AllMusic gave the album four out of five stars and felt that the album "mine[d] the rich history of pop music" as he noted that Bublé applied "his own technique to classic standards and incorporate[d] his Rat Pack sound into modern pop songs". The songs "Home", "Can't Buy Me Love", "Song for You", and "You and I" were called the highlights of the album. Woodrow Wilkins from All About Jazz commended how It's Time was "relevant to today's audience" and noted that Bublé "delivers [the songs] with the heart and passion that only a person who claims ownership of these titles can muster". However, Caroline Sullivan of The Guardian didn't appreciate the album's composition of jazz and pop covers, saying that "Sinatra is turning in his grave". Amy Lichty of the Daily Emerald said that "Bublé's clear voice and smooth rhythms keep the CD moving along", but also noted that he "is simply no match for either Sinatra or Connick"

== Track listing ==
Standard edition
No.	Title	Writer(s)	Length
1.	"Feeling Good"	Leslie Bricusse; Anthony Newley	3:57
2.	"A Foggy Day (In London Town)"	George Gershwin; Ira Gershwin	2:31
3.	"You Don't Know Me"	Eddy Arnold; Cindy Walker	4:14
4.	"Quando, Quando, Quando" (duet with Nelly Furtado)	Tony Renis; Alberto Testa; Ervin Drake	4:45
5.	"Home"	Michael Bublé; Alan Chang; Amy Foster-Gillies	3:45
6.	"Can't Buy Me Love"	John Lennon; Paul McCartney	3:14
7.	"The More I See You"	Mack Gordon; Harry Warren	3:47
8.	"Save the Last Dance for Me"	Doc Pomus; Mort Shuman	3:38
9.	"Try a Little Tenderness"	James Campbell; Reginald Connelly; Harry Woods	4:05
10.	"How Sweet It Is"	Lamont Dozier; Brian Holland; Eddie Holland	2:58
11.	"Song for You" (feat. Chris Botti)	Leon Russell	4:42
12.	"I've Got You Under My Skin"	Cole Porter	3:40
13.	"You and I"	Stevie Wonder	3:55
Total length:			49:11

Special deluxe edition bonus tracks
No.	Title	Writer(s)	Length
14.	"Dream a Little Dream"	Fabian Andre; Gus Kahn; Wilbur Schwandt	3:08
15.	"Mack the Knife"	Marc Blitzstein; Bertolt Brecht; Kurt Weill	3:20
Total length:			55:39

iTunes Store deluxe edition bonus tracks
No.	Title	Writer(s)	Length
14.	"Home" (Remix)	Michael Bublé; Alan Chang; Amy Foster-Gillies	3:41
15.	"Feeling Good" (Live)	Leslie Bricusse; Anthony Newley	5:06
Total length:			57:58

Fan club edition bonus tracks
No.	Title	Writer(s)	Length
14.	"It's All in the Game"	Carl Sigman; Charles Dawes	3:53
15.	"I'm Beginning to See the Light"	Duke Ellington; Don George; Johnny Hodges; Harry James	2:49
16.	"Softly, as I Leave You"	Antonio De Vita; Hal Shaper	3:47
Total length:			59:40

Starbucks special edition bonus track
No.	Title	Writer(s)	Length
14.	"Come Fly with Me"	Jimmy Van Heusen; Sammy Cahn	3:19
Total length:			52:30

Japanese special edition bonus track
No.	Title	Writer(s)	Length
14.	"Softly, as I Leave You"	Antonio De Vita; Hal Shaper	3:47
Total length:			52:58

Target special edition bonus EP: More
No.	Title	Writer(s)	Length
1.	"You'll Never Know" (Live)	Harry Warren; Mack Gordon	3:23
2.	"My Funny Valentine" (Live)	Richard Rodgers; Lorenz Hart	4:24
3.	"Nice 'n' Easy"	Alan Bergman; Marilyn Keith; Lew Spence	2:45
4.	"Mack the Knife"	Marc Blitzstein; Bertolt Brecht; Kurt Weill	3:20
5.	"I'm Beginning to See the Light"	Duke Ellington; Don George; Johnny Hodges; Harry James	2:49
6.	"Softly, as I Leave You"	Antonio De Vita; Hal Shaper	3:47
Total length:			20:28

== Personnel ==
Musicians

- Michael Bublé – vocals
- Neil Devor – programming
- Randy Waldman – acoustic piano (1, 2, 9, 12)
- Jochem van der Saag – programming (1, 5, 6, 8, 10), sound design (1, 5, 6, 8, 10), organ (6, 10), harmonica (10)
- Alan Chang – acoustic piano (3)
- David Foster – keyboards (4), acoustic piano (5, 8, 11, 13), bass (8, 10)
- Tamir Hendelman – acoustic piano (6, 7, 10)
- Dean Parks – guitars (1, 3, 5, 10), electric guitar (9)
- Brian Green – guitars (2, 3, 5), guitar solo (3, 5), acoustic guitar (9)
- Heitor Pereira – guitars (4)
- Anthony Wilson – guitars (7)
- Michael Thompson – electric guitar (8), guitars (12)
- Brandon Jenner – acoustic guitar (8)
- John Chiodini – guitars (12)
- Brian Bromberg – bass (1–5, 9, 11, 12, 13)
- Robert Hurst – bass (6)
- Christian McBride – bass (7)
- Vinnie Colaiuta – drums (1, 3, 4, 5, 8, 9, 11)
- Dave Tull – drums (2, 13)
- Jeff Hamilton – drums (6, 7, 10)
- Frank Capp – drums (12)
- Rafael Padilla – percussion (1, 2, 4, 5, 6, 8)
- Dan Higgins – flute (4), saxophone (4)
- Jeff Clayton – lead alto saxophone (7)
- Keith Fiddmont – alto saxophone (7)
- Lee Callet – baritone saxophone (7)
- Charles Owens – tenor saxophone (7)
- Rickey Woodard – tenor saxophone (7), tenor sax solo (7)
- Bill Reichenbach Jr. – bass trombone (7)
- George Bohanon – trombone (7)
- Ira Nepus – trombone (7)
- Ryan Porter – trombone (7)
- Gilbert Castellanos – trumpet (7)
- Sal Cracchiolo – trumpet (7)
- Kye Palmer – trumpet (7)
- Bijon Watson – trumpet (7)
- Chris Botti – trumpet solo (11)
- Nelly Furtado – vocals (4)
- Debbie Timuss – backing vocals (5)

Arrangements

- David Foster – arrangements (1, 3–6, 8, 9, 11, 13)
- Don Sebesky – arrangements (1)
- Bill Holman – arrangements (2)
- William Ross – arrangements (3, 5, 9, 11)
- Jorge Calandrelli – string arrangements (4)
- John Clayon Jr. – arrangements (6, 7, 10)
- Jerry Hey – arrangements (8)
- Nelson Riddle – original arrangements (12)
- Sammy Nestico – orchestration (12)
- Jeremy Lubbock – arrangements (13)
- Julie Eidsvoog, Joann Kane and Suzie Katayama – music preparation
- Debbi Datz-Pyle and Patti Zimmitti – music contractors
- Shari Sutcliffe – horn contractor (7)

== Production ==
- David Foster – producer (1–6, 8–13)
- Humberto Gatica – producer (1–6, 8–13), recording (1–6, 8–13), mixing (1–6, 8–13)
- Tommy LiPuma – producer (7)
- Al Schmitt – recording (7), mixing (7)
- Neil Devor – additional engineer (1–6, 8–13), digital audio engineer (1–6, 8–13)
- Alejandro Rodriguez – additional engineer (1–6, 8–13), digital audio engineer (1–6, 8–13)
- Cristian Robles – digital audio engineer (1–6, 8–13), orchestral mix assistant
- Jorge Vivo – digital audio engineer (1–6, 8–13), additional engineer (8)
- Joe Wolhmuth – digital audio engineer (1–6, 8–13)
- Jason Larian – assistant engineer (1–6, 8–13)
- Andy Brohard – assistant engineer (7)
- Wil Donovan – assistant engineer (7)
- Bruce Monical – assistant engineer (7)
- Steve Genewick – Pro Tools engineer (7)
- Jason Carson – orchestral recording assistant
- Wade Childers – orchestral recording assistant
- Norm Dlugatch – orchestral recording assistant
- Alex Gibson – orchestral recording assistant
- Dominic Gonzales – orchestral recording assistant
- Anthony Kilhoffer – orchestral recording assistant
- Patrick Spain – orchestral recording assistant
- Rich Toenes – orchestral recording assistant
- Mark Valentine – orchestral recording assistant
- Paul Wertheimer – orchestral recording assistant
- Courtney Blooding – orchestral mix assistant, production coordinator
- Vlado Meller – mastering
- Kathy Frangetis – production coordinator
- Mick Haggerty – art direction, design
- Olaf Heine – photography
- Hugo Boss – wardrobe
- Bruce Allen – management

Studios

- Recorded and Mixed at Chartmaker Studios (Malibu, California) and Capitol Studios (Hollywood, California). Additional recording at The Village Recorder (Los Angeles, California).
- Orchestra recorded at Henson Recording Studios and Paramount Recording Studios (Hollywood, California); Record Plant, Signet Sound Studios and Warner Bros. Sound Stage (Los Angeles, California); Mixed at Chartmaker Studios.
- Mastered at Sony Music Studios (New York City, New York).

== Charts ==
=== Weekly charts ===
Chart (2005–2007)	Peak position
Australian Albums (ARIA)	2
Austrian Albums (Ö3 Austria)	3
Belgian Albums (Ultratop Flanders)	14
Belgian Albums (Ultratop Wallonia)	7
Canadian Albums (Billboard)	1
Danish Albums (Hitlisten)	18
Dutch Albums (Album Top 100)	2
French Albums (SNEP)	23
German Albums (Offizielle Top 100)	2
Hungarian Albums (MAHASZ)	17
Irish Albums (IRMA)	5
Italian Albums (FIMI)	1
New Zealand Albums (RMNZ)	5
Norwegian Albums (VG-lista)	5
Polish Albums (OLiS)	3
Portuguese Albums (AFP)	20
Scottish Albums (OCC)	3
Singaporean Albums (RIAS)	1
Spanish Albums (PROMUSICAE)	1
Swedish Albums (Sverigetopplistan)	4
Swiss Albums (Schweizer Hitparade)	7
Taiwanese Albums (Five Music)	3
UK Albums (OCC)	4
US Billboard 200	7
US Top Jazz Albums (Billboard)	1

=== Year-end charts ===
Chart (2005)	Position
Australian Albums (ARIA)	3
Austrian Albums (Ö3 Austria)	17
Belgian Albums (Ultratop Flanders)	63
Belgian Albums (Ultratop Wallonia)	29
Dutch Albums (Album Top 100)	13
French Albums (SNEP)	116
German Albums (Offizielle Top 100)	12
Swiss Albums (Schweizer Hitparade)	21
UK Albums (OCC)	42
US Billboard 200	61
Worldwide Albums (IFPI)	13

Chart (2006)	Position
Swedish Albums (Sverigetopplistan)	35
US Billboard 200	40

Chart (2008)	Position
Australian Albums (ARIA)	78
UK Albums (OCC)	194

Chart (2010)	Position
UK Albums (OCC)	135
US Billboard 200	171

=== Decade-end charts ===
Chart (2000–2009)	Position
Australian Albums (ARIA)	30

== Certifications and sales ==
Region	Certification	Certified units/sales
Australia (ARIA)	5× Platinum	350,000^{^}
Austria (IFPI Austria)	Gold	15,000^{*}
Belgium (BRMA)	Platinum	50,000^{*}
Canada (Music Canada)	6× Platinum	600,000^{^}
Denmark (IFPI Danmark)	2× Platinum	40,000^{‡}
France (SNEP)	Gold	75,000^{*}
Germany (BVMI)	2× Platinum	400,000^{^}
Ireland (IRMA)	Platinum	15,000^{^}
Italy (FIMI)	4× Platinum	370,000
Italy (FIMI) sales since 2009	Gold	30,000^{*}
Netherlands (NVPI)	Gold	40,000^{^}
New Zealand (RMNZ)	Platinum	15,000^{^}
Philippines (PARI)	Platinum	15,000^{*}
Poland (ZPAV)	Platinum	40,000^{*}
Portugal (AFP)	Gold	20,000^{^}
Spain (PROMUSICAE)	Gold	50,000^{^}
Switzerland (IFPI Switzerland)	Platinum	40,000^{^}
United Kingdom (BPI)	2× Platinum	600,000^{^}
United States (RIAA)	3× Platinum	3,790,000
Summaries
Europe (IFPI)	2× Platinum	2,000,000^{*}
^{*} Sales figures based on certification alone.^{^} Shipments figures based on certification alone.^{‡} Sales+streaming figures based on certification alone.
