= Spider-Man (theme song) =

From the 1967 animated television series

"Spider-Man" is the theme song of the 1967 cartoon show Spider-Man, composed by Paul Francis Webster and Bob Harris. The original song was recorded at RCA Studios in Toronto (where the cartoon was produced) featuring 12 CBC vocalists (members of the Billy Van Singers, and Laurie Bower Singers groups) who added to the musical backing track supplied by RCA Studios, New York. The singers were paid only for the session and have had no residuals from its use since then.

The song has since been adopted as Spider-Man's official theme, including in-universe.

== Lyrics ==
The song summarizes Spider-Man's abilities and activities, beginning with the lyric:

Spider-Man, Spider-Man
Does whatever a spider can
Spins a web, any size
Catches thieves, just like flies
Look out, here comes the Spider-Man.

Additional lyrics describe how he has super-strength due to his "radioactive blood", and how he can swing "from a thread".

== Other versions ==
=== Film ===
- The Spider-Man (2002) and Spider-Man 2 (2004) film adaptations featured characters as buskers performing the song: Jayce Bartok and Elyse Dinh respectively. Both films also feature the song at the very end of the credits: the 2002 film featured the 1967 version, while the 2004 film featured a re-recording by Michael Bublé. The soundtracks to the 2002 film and 2007 film also features a cover by Aerosmith and Flaming Lips respectively. Spider-Man 3 (2007) had the song played by a marching band during a scene where Spider-Man arrives at a celebration.
- In The Amazing Spider-Man 2 (2014), Peter has the theme song as a ringtone and whistles the tune while defeating the Rhino.
- In Spider-Man: Homecoming (2017), the theme (orchestrated by Michael Giacchino) is played during the Marvel Studios logo at the beginning of the film.
- In Spider-Man: Into the Spider-Verse (2018), the Peter Parker of Earth-1610B refers to it as his own "catchy theme song", with footage of the 1967 animated series' opening. The intro to the theme is also played during the post credits scene, when Miguel O'Hara / Spider-Man 2099 (voiced by Oscar Isaac) arrives on Earth-67, the home dimension of the animated series' events.
- In Spider-Man: Across the Spider-Verse (2023), an excerpt of the theme is played when Earth-67's Spider-Man (voiced by Jorma Taccone) attempts to intercept Miles Morales within the Spider-Society's headquarters, as the latter attempts to return to his home reality.
- In Spider-Man: Brand New Day (2026), an arrangement of the theme serves as the jingle for Ned Leeds' (Jacob Batalon) "Spidey Tracker" app.

=== Television ===
Samples of the theme song was used for the Marvel Cinematic Universe animated series Your Friendly Neighborhood Spider-Man theme song "Neighbor Like Me" by The Math Club featuring Relaye and Melo Makes Music.

=== Video games ===
A remix by Apollo 440 is used in the 2000 action-adventure video game Spider-Man, developed by Neversoft and published by Activision. The song is used in the title screen and the credits, and an instrumental version of it plays in the main menu.

A cover by The Distillers is used in the credits of the 2004 video game Spider-Man 2, the tie-in game for the Sam Raimi film. This cover was re-released in 2019 with a single artwork titled "Spider-Bro" by Linas Garsys.

=== Covers ===
In 1993, Canadian group Moxy Früvous recorded a version for their debut album, Bargainville. Their version includes more satirical lyrics, as Spider-Man promotes his various items of licensed merchandise.

In 1995, Ramones recorded a version of the song for the tribute album Saturday Morning: Cartoons' Greatest Hits. A different recording of the song appeared on the American version of their album Adios Amigos, and later as part of the compilation album Weird Tales of the Ramones. This version omits the hyphen, spelling it "Spiderman".

In 2019, pianist Randy Waldman recorded a jazz version featuring vocals by a capella group Take 6 for his album Superheroes, with theme songs from superhero films and series.
