= Let It Snow (EP) =

Let It Snow!

EP by Michael Bublé
- Released: November 25, 2003
- Recorded: 2003
- Genre: Christmas; vocal jazz; traditional pop
- Length: 17:39
- Label: Reprise
- Producer: David Foster

Michael Bublé chronology
Totally Bublé (2003)	Let It Snow! (2003)	Come Fly with Me (2004)

Let It Snow! is an EP by Canadian artist Michael Bublé, released in the United States on November 25, 2003. It was later re-released in the United States on October 8, 2007, and in the United Kingdom on October 16, 2007. The EP was available in the US as a digital download and on CD, but the CD release in the UK was exclusive to HMV stores. The EP includes five new, previously unreleased tracks.

The EP was later reissued as a bonus CD with the deluxe edition of Bublé's self-titled debut album. Some of the songs on the EP were re-recorded for inclusion on Bublé's fifth studio album, Christmas (2011). The track "Grown-Up Christmas List" was serviced to radio in promotion of the EP. The 2007 re-release includes a live version of "Let It Snow! Let It Snow! Let It Snow!".

The EP has sold 1,032,000 copies as of December 2012.

== Track listing ==
No.	Title	Writer(s)	Length
1.	"Let It Snow! Let It Snow! Let It Snow!"	Sammy Cahn, Jule Styne	2:05
2.	"The Christmas Song"	Mel Tormé, Robert Wells	4:15
3.	"Grown-Up Christmas List"	David Foster, Linda Thompson	3:41
4.	"I'll Be Home for Christmas"	Walter Kent, Kim Gannon, Buck Ram	3:39
5.	"White Christmas"	Irving Berlin	3:59
Total length:			17:39

2007 edition
No.	Title	Writer(s)	Length
6.	"Let It Snow! Let It Snow! Let It Snow!" (live)	Sammy Cahn, Jule Styne	2:24
Total length:			20:03

== Charts ==
=== Weekly charts ===
Chart (2007–2010)	Peak position
Scottish Albums (OCC)	74
UK Albums (OCC)	71
US Billboard 200	32
US Top Holiday Albums (Billboard)	4

=== Year-end charts ===
Chart (2010)	Position
US Billboard 200	184

== Release history ==
Region	Date	Label
United States	November 25, 2003	Reprise Records
United States	October 8, 2007	Reprise Records
United Kingdom	October 16, 2007	Reprise Records
