= That's All (1952 song) =

Song
- Published: 1954 by Travis Music/Keys-Hansen
- Composer: Bob Haymes
- Lyricist: Alan Brandt

"That's All" is a song written in 1952 by Alan Brandt with music by Bob Haymes. It has been covered by many jazz and blues artists. The first recording, by Nat King Cole in 1953, achieved some popularity but was not among that year's top 20 songs. It was Bobby Darin's version from his 1959 album of the same title that introduced the song to a wider audience, and it has since become a jazz standard.

It was used as theme and bumper music, and as background behind live advertising announcements, on the overnight classical music program, American Airlines Music Til Dawn, which ran on clear-channel AM radio stations, mostly but not all CBS, from 1953 to 1970.

The song is part of the Great American Songbook, and Alec Wilder included it in his book American Popular Song: The Great Innovators, 1900–1950, even though it was composed two years after that period. Wilder gave two reasons for making this exception: (1) "it is one of the last free-flowing, native, and natural melodies in the grand pop style"; (2) "it went through no initial hit phase but became an immediate standard".

== Cover versions ==
- Peggy Lee on The Man I Love (1957).
- Sarah Vaughan on Sarah Vaughan à Paris (1958).
- Bobby Darin on That's All (1959).
- Tommy Edwards (Thomas Jefferson Edwards) on It's All in the Game (1958).
- Rick Nelson on his fourth studio album, Songs By Ricky (1959), which reached the top 10 on Cashbox. Nelson also performed it on a 1959 episode of The Adventures of Ozzie and Harriet entitled "Who Needs Girls?" (S08•04).
- Henry Mancini on The Mancini Touch (1960).
- Edie Adams on the final episode of I Love Lucy, aired April 1, 1960.
- Frank Sinatra on Sinatra and Strings (1962).
- Mel Tormé on That's All (1965).
- Rod Stewart on It Had to Be You: The Great American Songbook (2002).
- Steve Tyrell on This Guy's In Love (2003).
- Michael Bublé on Michael Bublé (2003).
- Eliane Elias on Dreamer (2004).
- Stacey Kent on Tenderly (Sony/Okeh, 2015)
- Teddy Swims live at BBC Music BBCRadio2 Piano room (2025)
