= Call Me Irresponsible (album) =

Studio album by Michael Bublé
- Released: May 1, 2007
- Recorded: September 2006 – March 2007
- Studios: Chartmaker, Los Angeles, California
- Genres: Vocal jazz; traditional pop
- Length: 50:27
- Labels: 143; Reprise
- Producers: David Foster; Humberto Gatica; Bob Rock

Michael Bublé chronology
With Love (2006)	Call Me Irresponsible (2007)	Michael Bublé Meets Madison Square Garden (2009)

Singles from Call Me Irresponsible
- 1. "Everything" Released: April 23, 2007; 2. "Me and Mrs. Jones" Released: September 3, 2007; 3. "Lost" Released: November 12, 2007; 4. "It Had Better Be Tonight" Released: December 8, 2007; 5. "Comin' Home Baby" Released: April 25, 2008

Call Me Irresponsible is the fifth studio album by Canadian singer Michael Bublé. Released on May 1, 2007, via 143 and Reprise Records, it was produced by David Foster, Humberto Gatica, and Bob Rock. The album features renditions of classic traditional pop songs, including the title track "Call Me Irresponsible", "'Always on My Mind", and "Comin' Home Baby" featuring Boyz II Men. Two original tracks were written for the album, "Everything" and "Lost", both of which were co-written by Bublé.

Receiving mainly positive reception from critics, the album topped record charts in ten different countries, including the Canadian Albums Chart and the Billboard 200, Bublé's first entry to top the chart. It was certified four times platinum by Music Canada and platinum by the Recording Industry Association of America in the United States, with 400,000 and 2 million certified copies respectively.

== Release ==
The album's first single, "Everything", peaked at #46 on the U.S. Hot 100, Bublé's highest-peaking song until "Haven't Met You Yet" became his first Top 40 hit in 2009. It also debuted at number 3 on the Canadian BDS Airplay Charts and now holds the record for the highest debut ever on that chart. It also peaked at number 19 on the Australian ARIA Singles chart. Bublé appeared on an American Idol season 6 results show to sing "Call Me Irresponsible" when scheduled singer Tony Bennett, with whom he had collaborated before on the album Duets: An American Classic (2006) was unable to attend. On Monday, April 23, 2007, members of Bublé's official fanclub Bungalow B were given an exclusive listening party of the album's tracks and a look at a video clip at "Lost", Bublé's second original song. On this day, his official site was also given a makeover to match his coming album and his official YouTube channel released the video for the lead single. The channel also has behind-the-scenes videos and short snippets of videos used to make various commercials and preview clips. The entire album leaked shortly before its release. This album won the Grammy Award for Best Traditional Pop Vocal Album in 2007.

== Critical reception ==
Professional ratings
Review scores
Source	Rating
AllMusic	4/5 stars
All About Jazz	4.5/5 stars
USA Today	3/4 stars

The album received positive reception from music critics. Matt Collar of AllMusic rated the album four stars out of five, stating, "the album is a breezy, stylish good time... the unexpected reworkings of contemporary pop songs often make the biggest impact". Woodrow Wilkins of All About Jazz described Bublé's performances as "charismatic, talented and just plain good", stating further, "while maintaining a jazz flavor, this arrangement also captures a soulful element". Leigh Maneri of The Quinnipiac Chronicle rated the album five stars out of five, stating, " It is the perfect mixture of upbeat, soulful and serene melodies".

== Chart performance ==
In the U.S., the album debuted at number two on the Billboard 200 and rose to number one in its second week. The album is certified 1× platinum in United States. In Australia, the single peaked at number 19 on the ARIA Singles Chart. While the album debuted on the ARIA Albums Chart at number 1 with Bublé selling 37,005 copies of the album in the first week and giving him the highest sales for an album by an international artist in Australia for 2007. The album was also certified Platinum in its first week for shipments of 70,000 copies. The album sold a further 30,634 copies the second week, making Bublé the first artist in Australia for 2007 to sell over 30,000 units two weeks in a row. The album is now certified 4× platinum by ARIA for shipments of 280,000 copies. The album rose to number one again on July 2 and 9 and once more on July 22. The original version of Call Me Irresponsible has sold over 300,000 copies in the UK. In Europe, the album was certified 2× Platinum by IFPI for shipments of two million copies to date.

== Track listing ==
Standard edition
No.	Title	Writer(s)	Producer(s)	Length
1.	"The Best Is Yet to Come"	Cy Coleman; Carolyn Leigh	David Foster; Humberto Gatica	3:05
2.	"It Had Better Be Tonight" ("Meglio Stasera")	Henry N. Mancini; Johnny Mercer; Franco Migliacci	Foster; Gatica	3:06
3.	"Me and Mrs. Jones"	Leon Huff; Kenneth Gamble; Cary Gilbert	Foster; Gatica	4:33
4.	"I'm Your Man"	Leonard Cohen	Foster; Gatica	4:59
5.	"Comin' Home Baby" (duet with Boyz II Men)	Robert L. Dorough; Benjamin M. Tucker	Foster; Gatica	3:27
6.	"Lost"	Michael Bublé; Jann Arden; Alan Chang	Foster; Gatica	3:40
7.	"Call Me Irresponsible"	Sammy Cahn; Jimmy Van Heusen	Foster; Gatica	3:16
8.	"Wonderful Tonight" (duet with Ivan Lins)	Eric Clapton	Foster; Gatica	4:12
9.	"Everything"	Bublé; Chang; Amy Foster-Gillies	Bob Rock	3:31
10.	"I've Got the World on a String"	Harold Arlen; Ted Koehler	Foster; Gatica	2:47
11.	"Always on My Mind"	Mark James; Wayne Thompson; John Christopher	Foster; Gatica	4:30
12.	"That's Life"	Kelly Gordon; Dean Thompson	Foster; Gatica	4:15
13.	"Dream"	Johnny Mercer	Foster; Gatica	5:06
Total length:				50:27

Special edition bonus track
No.	Title	Writer(s)	Producer(s)	Length
14.	"L O V E"	Milt Gabler; Bert Kaempfert	Foster; Gatica	2:50
Total length:				53:17

Japanese special edition bonus track
No.	Title	Writer(s)	Producer(s)	Length
14.	"These Foolish Things (Remind Me of You)"	Eric Maschwitz; Jack Strachey	Foster; Gatica	4:48
Total length:				55:15

Fan club edition bonus tracks
No.	Title	Writer(s)	Producer(s)	Length
14.	"L O V E"	Milt Gabler; Bert Kaempfert	Foster; Gatica	2:50
15.	"Orange Coloured Sky"	Milton DeLugg; Willie Stein	Foster; Gatica	3:30
Total length:				56:47

iTunes deluxe version bonus tracks
No.	Title	Writer(s)	Producer(s)	Length
14.	"L O V E"	Milt Gabler; Bert Kaempfert	Foster; Gatica	2:50
15.	"Call Me Irresponsible (Behind the Scenes)" (video)			3:12
Total length:				56:29

Europe tour edition bonus disc
No.	Title	Writer(s)	Producer(s)	Length
1.	"Stuck in the Middle with You"	Joseph Egan; Gerry Rafferty	Foster; Gatica	3:37
2.	"Lost" (Pop Mix)	Michael Bublé; Jann Arden; Alan Chang	Foster; Gatica	3:39
3.	"Home" (Pop Mix)	Michael Bublé; Amy Foster-Gillies; Alan Chang		3:41
4.	"Orange Coloured Sky"	Milton DeLugg; Willie Stein	Foster; Gatica	3:28
5.	"Everything" (Bob Rock Mix)	Bublé; Chang; Foster-Gillies	Bob Rock	3:29
6.	"Let It Snow! Let It Snow! Let It Snow!"	Sammy Cahn; Jule Styne	David Foster	2:06
7.	"The Christmas Song"	Mel Tormé; Bob Wells	Foster	4:14
8.	"White Christmas"	Irving Berlin	Foster	3:57
Total length:				28:11

Limited edition bonus DVD
No.	Title	Length
1.	"The Making of Call Me Irresponsible"	26:00
Total length:		26:00

== Personnel ==
Musicians

- Michael Bublé – vocals
- Jochem van der Saag – programming, sound design
- Gerald Clayton – keyboards (1), acoustic piano (5)
- Tamir Hendelman – acoustic piano (1, 7), synthesizers (13)
- David Foster – acoustic piano (2, 3, 6, 8, 10, 11), Rhodes piano (3, 8), keyboards (4)
- Alan Chang – additional acoustic piano (8), acoustic piano (9)
- Greg Phillinganes – acoustic piano (12)
- Mike Melvoin – acoustic piano (13)
- Graham Dechter – guitar (1)
- Dean Parks – guitar (2–6, 9–12)
- Heitor Pereira – guitar (8)
- Michael Landau – guitar (9)
- Keith Scott – guitar (9)
- David Sinclair – acoustic guitar (9)
- Larry Koonse – guitar (13)
- Christoph Luty – bass (1)
- Nathan East – bass guitar (2, 6)
- Brian Bromberg – bass guitar (3, 4, 5, 7, 8, 10, 11, 12)
- Norm Fisher – bass guitar (9)
- Chuck Berghofer – bass guitar (13)
- Jeff Hamilton – drums (1)
- Vinnie Colaiuta – drums (2–8, 10, 12)
- Josh Freese – drums (9)
- Joe LaBarbera – drums (11)
- Ralph Humphrey – drums (13)
- Emil Richards – percussion (1)
- Rafael Padilla – percussion (2, 3, 5, 6, 7, 9, 10, 12)
- Paulinho da Costa – percussion (4, 8)
- Marcelo Costa – percussion (8)
- Don Williams – percussion (13)
- Joel Peskin – saxophone solo (10)
- Emily Blunt – backing vocals (3)
- Boyz II Men – vocals (5)
- Ivan Lins – vocals (8)

The Clayton-Hamilton Jazz Orchestra Horn Section (Track 1)

- Steve Becknell, Daniel P. Kelley, Joe Meyer and John A. Reynolds – French horn
- Lee Callet, Frederick Fiddmont, Tom Peterson and Rickey Woodard – saxophones
- George Bohanon, Guy Nepal, Ryan Porter and Maurice Spears – trombone
- Gilbert Castellanos, Sal Cracchiolo, James Ford, Kye Palmer and Bijon Watson – trumpet
- Jim Self – tuba

Horns and Additional backing vocals (Track 10)

- David Boruff, Gary Foster Bill Liston, Sal Lozano and Joel Peskin – saxophones
- Alan Kaplan, Charles Loper, Bruce Otto and Phil Teele – trombone
- Rick Baptist, Wayne Bergeron, Dan Fornero and Bryan Lipps – trumpet

Choir (Track 12)

- Lynne Fiddmont, Anthony Field, Sharlotte Gibson, Clorishey Lewis, Valerie Pinkston, Louis Price, Donald Smith, Beverley Staunton, Lisa Vaughn, Windy Wagner and Mervyn Warren

Additional vocals

- Carmen Carter, Siedah Garrett and Toni Scruggs

Arrangements

- John Clayton Jr. – arrangements (1)
- David Foster – arrangements (2–6, 8, 10, 11), horn arrangements (2–5, 10), string arrangements (2, 3, 4, 11), vocal arrangements (5), rhythm arrangements (12)
- Jerry Hey – horn arrangements (2, 3, 5), string arrangements (2)
- William Ross – string arrangements (3, 11)
- Don Sebesky – horn arrangements (4, 10), string arrangements (4)
- Boyz II Men – vocal arrangements (5)
- Paul Buckmaster – string arrangements (6)
- Alan Chang – arrangements (6, 9)
- Bill Holman – arrangements (7)
- Jorge Calandrelli – string arrangements (8)
- Michael Bublé – arrangements (9), horn arrangements (10)
- Bob Rock – arrangements (9)
- Mervyn Warren – choir, horn, rhythm and string arrangements (12)
- Johnny Mandel – arrangements (13)

Music Contractors

- Ray Brown, Carmen Carter, Jules Chakin and Gina Zimmitti

Music Preparation

- Julie Eidsvoog, Suzie Katayama and Joann Kane

== Production ==
- David Foster – producer (1–8, 10–13)
- Humberto Gatica – producer (1–8, 10–13), recording (1–8, 10–13), mixing
- Bob Rock – producer (9)
- Johnny Mandel – co-producer (13)
- Moogie Canazio – engineer (8)
- Eric Helmkamp – recording (9)
- Alejandro Rodriguez – additional engineer, digital audio engineer
- Jorge Vivo – additional engineer, digital audio engineer
- Jochem van der Saag – additional engineer
- Chris Brooke – digital audio engineer
- Sam Holland – assistant engineer
- Mike Houge – assistant engineer
- Sam Koop – assistant engineer
- Dean Maher – assistant engineer
- Eric Mosher – assistant engineer
- Jared Nugent – assistant engineer
- Eric Rennaker – assistant engineer
- Antonio Resendiz – assistant engineer
- Andrew Shaw – assistant engineer
- Paul Smith – assistant engineer
- Seth Waldmann – assistant engineer
- Aaron Walk – assistant engineer
- Ghian Wright – assistant engineer
- Vlado Meller – mastering
- Janna Terrasi – A&R administration
- Kathy Frangetis – A&R assistant
- Courtney Blooding – production coordinator
- Maggie Cashman – production assistant
- Matt Taylor – art direction, design, additional photography
- Ellen Wakayama – art direction
- William Claxton – photography
- Eric Ogden – photography
- Hugo Boss – wardrobe
- Bruce Allen – management

Studios

- Additional recording at Capitol Studios and Conway Studios (Hollywood, California); Signet Sound Studios, Westlake Audio, The Village Recorder and Record Plant (Los Angeles, California); The Warehouse Studio (Vancouver, British Columbia, Canada).
- Masteted at Sony Music Studios (New York City, New York).

== Charts ==
Professional ratings
Review scores
Source	Rating
AllMusic	4/5 stars
In the News	9/10
Okayplayer	4.45/5

=== Weekly charts ===
Chart (2007–2008)	Peak position
Australian Albums (ARIA)	1
Austrian Albums (Ö3 Austria)	2
Belgian Albums (Ultratop Flanders)	4
Belgian Albums (Ultratop Wallonia)	13
Canadian Albums (Billboard)	1
Danish Albums (Hitlisten)	9
Dutch Albums (Album Top 100)	1
French Albums (SNEP)	4
German Albums (Offizielle Top 100)	1
Hungarian Albums (MAHASZ)	5
Irish Albums (IRMA)	1
Italian Albums (FIMI)	1
New Zealand Albums (RMNZ)	7
Norwegian Albums (VG-lista)	10
Polish Albums (OLiS)	11
Portuguese Albums (AFP)	9
Scottish Albums (Official Charts)	2
Scottish Albums (Official Charts) Special Edition	4
South African Albums (RISA)	1
Spanish Albums (Promusicae)	8
Swedish Albums (Sverigetopplistan)	5
Swiss Albums (Schweizer Hitparade)	3
Taiwanese Albums (Five Music)	2
UK Albums (Official Charts)	2
UK Albums (Official Charts) Special Edition	3
US Billboard 200	1
US Top Jazz Albums (Billboard)	1

=== Year-end charts ===
Chart (2007)	Position
Australian Albums (ARIA)	1
Austrian Albums (Ö3 Austria)	54
Belgian Albums (Ultratop Flanders)	19
Belgian Albums (Ultratop Wallonia)	26
Dutch Albums (Album Top 100)	2
French Albums (SNEP)	37
German Albums (Offizielle Top 100)	26
Swedish Albums (Sverigetopplistan)	66
Swiss Albums (Schweizer Hitparade)	25
UK Albums (OCC)	66
UK Albums (OCC) Special Edition	18
US Billboard 200	39
Chart (2008)	Position
Australian Albums (ARIA)	28
Belgian Albums (Ultratop Flanders)	80
Belgian Albums (Ultratop Wallonia)	84
Canadian Albums (Billboard)	22
Dutch Albums (Album Top 100)	37
UK Albums (OCC) Special Edition	27
US Billboard 200	51
Chart (2010)	Position
UK Albums (OCC)	94
US Billboard 200	188

=== Decade-end charts ===
Chart (2000–2009)	Position
Australian Albums (ARIA)	34
US Billboard 200	188

== Certifications and sales ==
Region	Certification	Certified units/sales
Australia (ARIA)	5× Platinum	350,000^{‡}
Austria (IFPI Austria)	Gold	10,000^{*}
Belgium (BRMA)	Gold	15,000^{*}
Canada (Music Canada)	4× Platinum	400,000^{^}
Denmark (IFPI Danmark)	3× Platinum	60,000^{‡}
France (SNEP)	Gold	75,000^{*}
Germany (BVMI)	Platinum	200,000^{^}
Hungary (MAHASZ)	Gold	3,000^{^}
Italy (FIMI)	Gold	30,000^{*}
Netherlands (NVPI)	Gold	35,000^{^}
New Zealand (RMNZ)	Gold	7,500^{^}
Portugal (AFP)	Platinum	20,000^{^}
South Africa (RISA)	Platinum	40,000^{*}
Switzerland (IFPI Switzerland)	Platinum	30,000^{^}
United Kingdom (BPI) Standard edition	Platinum	300,000^{^}
United Kingdom (BPI) Special edition	3× Platinum	900,000^{^}
United States (RIAA)	Platinum	2,244,000
Summaries
Europe (IFPI)	2× Platinum	2,000,000^{*}
Worldwide 2007 sales	—	4,100,000
^{*} Sales figures based on certification alone.^{^} Shipments figures based on certification alone.^{‡} Sales+streaming figures based on certification alone.
