= Crazy Love Tour =

2010–12 concert tour by Michael Bublé

- World tour by Michael Bublé
- Associated album: Crazy Love
- Start date: March 10, 2010
- End date: May 6, 2012
- Legs: 10
- No. of shows: 185
- Box office: US $127 million ($178.1 in 2025 dollars)

Michael Bublé concert chronology
- Call Me Irresponsible World Tour (2007–08); Crazy Love Tour (2010–12); To Be Loved Tour (2013–15)

Crazy Love Tour was the fourth concert tour by Canadian singer Michael Bublé. The tour supported his sixth studio album, Crazy Love (2009). Visiting the Americas, Europe, Australia, Asia, and Africa, the tour has played to over one million spectators in nearly 21 countries. The tour has received remarkable praise from both music critics and spectators of the show. In 2010, Pollstar announced the trek became the sixth highest-grossing tour worldwide, earning over $100 million with 99 sold-out shows. Additionally was the fourth highest-grossing tour in North America—bringing in over $60 million in revenue with 50 sold-out shows. The tour ranked 16th in Pollstar's "Top 50 Worldwide Tour (Mid-Year)", earning over 30 million dollars in 2011. At the conclusion of 2011, the tour placed eleventh on Billboard's annual "Top 25 Tours", earning nearly $50 million with 57 shows in 2011.

== Background ==
The tour was officially announced in November 2009. Describing the tour, Bublé stated, "The show will be bombastic, cinematic and at the same time a very intimate experience. I can't wait to get back out on the road and of course—to see my fans. I've missed them." During an interview with The Scotsman, Bublé commented on how the show wasn't a typical Las Vegas revue. The singer did not want to rely on creating a "spectacle" to create an enjoyable performance. Bublé felt that vocals were important and every thing else was a bonus. The tour marks Bublé second endeavor playing arenas in North America and Europe. Bublé wanted to create an intimate theater-styled show in the arena setting—making the show warm and inviting. Productions rehearsals were held at the Jacksonville Veterans Memorial Arena in Jacksonville, Florida from 26 February 2010 to 7 March 2010. The tour commenced on 10 March 2010 at the Amway Arena in Orlando, Florida to a sold-out crowd. The trek continued into Europe, Australia and Asia, giving nearly 150 performances to over one million spectators.

Expect to come and be taken away for a couple hours. I really, sincerely love what I do for a living. The fact that I get to do this and do what I love with these people […] They're gonna see that right away. The production is going to be extravagant in some places, but very intimate in others. I think you'll get a great beginning, middle and end. There will be parts that are bombastic. It's now, obviously, an arena show. It's a rock show. There will be parts that should be quiet and intimate and small. I'm hoping that people enjoy the trip. I know I'm going to enjoy taking them on it.

=== Staging ===
Although Bublé is regarded as a contemporary jazz artist, the staging for his recent tour resembled the staging of many rock musicians. Wanting to move away from the typical Vegas cabaret setting, the stage was designed by Mark Fisher, known for his work with Tina Turner, Pink Floyd and U2. At 75' x 32', the stage allows ample space for a 13-piece band and an eight piece orchestra. It also includes a B-stage where the singer performs "Home". The stage features six cylindrical light towers made with VersaTube lighting and video effects. There is also a video screen in between each columns that displays video footage of the city in which Bublé is performing. Both the video screens and columns alternate configuration throughout the show.

== Opening act ==
- Naturally 7

== Setlist ==
Set I

10 March 2010 – 3 November 2010

1. "Cry Me a River"
2. "All of Me"
3. "At This Moment"
4. "Mack the Knife"
5. "Everything"
6. "I've Got the World on a String"
7. "Crazy Love"
8. "Georgia on My Mind"
9. "For Once in My Life"
10. Medley: "Billie Jean" / "Twist and Shout" (performed with Naturally 7)
11. "All I Do Is Dream of You" (performed with Naturally 7)
12. "Home"
13. "Save the Last Dance for Me"
14. "How Sweet It Is (To Be Loved by You)"
15. "Heartache Tonight"
16. "Haven't Met You Yet"

Encore

17. "Feeling Good"
18. "Me and Mrs. Jones"
19. "A Song for You"
Set II

23 November 2010 – 6 May 2012

1. "Cry Me a River"
2. "All of Me"
3. "At This Moment"
4. "Mack the Knife"
5. "Everything"
6. "I've Got the World on a String"
7. "Best of Me"
8. "Crazy Love"
9. "Georgia on My Mind"
10. "For Once in My Life"
11. Medley: "Billie Jean" / "Twist and Shout" (performed with Naturally 7)
12. "All I Do Is Dream of You" (performed with Naturally 7)
13. "Some Kind of Wonderful"
14. "Home"
15. "Hollywood" (performed with Naturally 7)
16. "How Sweet It Is (To Be Loved by You)"
17. "Heartache Tonight"
18. "Haven't Met You Yet" (contains an excerpt from "I Gotta Feeling")

Encore

19. "Feeling Good"
20. "Me and Mrs. Jones"
21. "A Song for You"

Notes

- During concerts in December 2010, Bublé performed "Let It Snow! Let It Snow! Let It Snow!" during the encore.

== Tour dates ==
List of concerts, showing date, city, country, venue, tickets sold, number of available tickets and amount of gross revenue
Date	City	Country	Venue	Attendance	Revenue
North America
10 March 2010	Orlando	United States	Amway Arena	10,972 / 10,972	$877,323
12 March 2010	Sunrise	United States	BankAtlantic Center	12,808 / 12,808	$1,045,323
13 March 2010	Tampa	United States	St. Pete Times Forum	13,433 / 13,433	$1,075,956
14 March 2010	Duluth	United States	Arena at Gwinnett Center	9,765 / 9,765	$810,215
16 March 2010	Philadelphia	United States	Wachovia Center	14,052 / 14,052	$1,144,431
17 March 2010	Pittsburgh	United States	Petersen Events Center	8,950 / 8,950	$682,408
19 March 2010	Worcester	United States	DCU Center	10,063 / 10,063	$831,579
20 March 2010	New York City	United States	Madison Square Garden	26,261 / 26,261 (Note: The score data is combined from the shows held at the Madison Square Garden from 20 March and 28 November 2010, respectively.)	$2,918,529
23 March 2010	Cleveland	United States	Wolstein Center	9,812 / 9,812	$797,000
24 March 2010	Cincinnati	United States	U.S. Bank Arena	10,539 / 10,539	$802,326
25 March 2010	Auburn Hills	United States	The Palace of Auburn Hills	13,230 / 13,230	$922,337
27 March 2010	Rosemont	United States	Allstate Arena	12,797 / 12,797	$1,112,352
28 March 2010	Saint Paul	United States	Xcel Energy Center	13,371 / 13,371	$1,059,000
30 March 2010	Denver	United States	Pepsi Center	9,188 / 9,188	$728,155
31 March 2010	West Valley City	United States	E Center	—N/a	—N/a
2 April 2010	Portland	United States	Rose Garden Arena	9,793 / 9,793	$666,890
3 April 2010	Seattle	United States	KeyArena	11,170 / 11,170	$884,580
6 April 2010	Oakland	United States	Oracle Arena	12,031 / 12,031	$989,006
8 April 2010	Phoenix	United States	US Airways Center	12,561 / 12,561	$992,442
9 April 2010	Los Angeles	United States	Staples Center	25,298 / 25,298 (Note: The score data is combined from the shows held at the Staples Center from 9 April and 13 December 2010, respectively.)	$2,217,505
Europe
6 May 2010	Sheffield	England	Sheffield Arena	11,424 / 11,630	$898,426
8 May 2010	Glasgow	Scotland	Scottish Exhibition Hall 4	8,871 / 8,871	$678,980
9 May 2010	Manchester	England	Manchester Evening News Arena	42,814 / 43,208 (Note: The score data is combined from the shows held at the Manchester Evening News Arena from 9 May and 6, 7 October 2010, respectively.)	$3,433,340
11 May 2010	Liverpool	England	Echo Arena Liverpool	9,662 / 9,823	$757,432
12 May 2010	Newcastle	England	Metro Radio Arena	19,119 / 19,334 (Note: The score data is combined from the shows held at the Metro Radio Arena from 12 May and 28 September 2010, respectively.)	$1,545,125
14 May 2010	Birmingham	England	LG Arena	12,538 / 12,919	$961,260
15 May 2010	London	England	The O_{2} Arena	31,633 31,796	$2,586,220
16 May 2010	London	England	The O_{2} Arena	31,633 31,796	$2,586,220
22 May 2010	Verona	Italy	Verona Arena	—N/a	—N/a
23 May 2010	Milan	Italy	Mediolanum Forum	—N/a	—N/a
25 May 2010	Munich	Germany	Olympiahalle	—N/a	—N/a
26 May 2010	Zürich	Switzerland	Hallenstadion	—N/a	—N/a
28 May 2010	Berlin	Germany	O_{2} World Berlin	—N/a	—N/a
30 May 2010	Antwerp	Belgium	Sportpaleis	23,601 / 24,498 (Note: The score data is combined from the shows held at the Sportpaleis from 30 May and 12 October 2010, respectively.)	$1,828,323
31 May 2010	Oberhausen	Germany	König Pilsener Arena	—N/a	—N/a
1 June 2010	Hamburg	Germany	O_{2} World Hamburg	6,794 / 9,606	$544,209
3 June 2010	Paris	France	Palais Omnisports de Paris-Bercy	15,740 / 20,154 (Note: The score data is combined from the shows held at the Palais Omnisports de Paris-Bercy from 3 June and 27 October 2010, respectively.)	$1,406,534
North America
22 June 2010	Tulsa	United States	BOK Center	11,121 / 11,121	$837,642
23 June 2010	Wichita	United States	Intrust Bank Arena	7,688 / 7,688	$577,866
25 June 2010	St. Louis	United States	Scottrade Center	11,828 / 11,828	$935,711
26 June 2010	Kansas City	United States	Sprint Center	12,905 / 12,905	$1,010,560
27 June 2010	Omaha	United States	Qwest Center Omaha	9,133 / 9,133	$731,474
29 June 2010	Indianapolis	United States	Conseco Fieldhouse	10,636 / 10,636	$851,813
30 June 2010	Columbus	United States	Nationwide Arena	11,392 / 11,392	$805,623
2 July 2010	Uncasville	United States	Mohegan Sun Arena	16,015 / 16,032	$1,544,545
3 July 2010	Uncasville	United States	Mohegan Sun Arena	16,015 / 16,032	$1,544,545
4 July 2010	Uncasville	United States	Mohegan Sun Arena	16,015 / 16,032	$1,544,545
6 July 2010	Richmond	United States	Richmond Coliseum	8,054 / 8,054	$625,603
7 July 2010	Norfolk	United States	Ted Constant Convocation Center	—N/a	—N/a
9 July 2010	Raleigh	United States	RBC Center	10,264 / 10,264	$795,716
10 July 2010	Charlotte	United States	Time Warner Cable Arena	10,163 / 10,163	$771,887
11 July 2010	Jacksonville	United States	Jacksonville Veterans Memorial Arena	10,720 / 10,720	$822,993
13 July 2010	Pensacola	United States	Pensacola Civic Center	6,365 / 6,800	$468,048
14 July 2010	New Orleans	United States	New Orleans Arena	10,919 / 10,919	$839,780
16 July 2010	Houston	United States	Toyota Center	12,076 / 12,076	$961,872
17 July 2010	San Antonio	United States	AT&T Center	13,561 / 13,561	$1,016,848
18 July 2010	Dallas	United States	American Airlines Center	13,482 / 13,482	$1,069,520
5 August 2010	Montreal	Canada	Bell Centre	24,022 / 24,022	$2,443,250
6 August 2010	Montreal	Canada	Bell Centre	24,022 / 24,022	$2,443,250
7 August 2010	Ottawa	Canada	Scotiabank Place	—N/a	—N/a
9 August 2010	London	Canada	John Labatt Centre	8,477 / 8,549	$835,524
10 August 2010	Toronto	Canada	Air Canada Centre	—N/a	—N/a
11 August 2010	Toronto	Canada	Air Canada Centre	—N/a	—N/a
13 August 2010	Winnipeg	Canada	MTS Centre	—N/a	—N/a
14 August 2010	Saskatoon	Canada	Credit Union Centre	—N/a	—N/a
17 August 2010	Calgary	Canada	Pengrowth Saddledome	—N/a	—N/a
18 August 2010	Calgary	Canada	Pengrowth Saddledome	—N/a	—N/a
20 August 2010	Vancouver	Canada	Rogers Arena	—N/a	—N/a
21 August 2010	Vancouver	Canada	Rogers Arena	—N/a	—N/a
24 August 2010	Sacramento	United States	ARCO Arena	8,743 / 8,743	$667,122
27 August 2010	San Diego	United States	San Diego Sports Arena	10,550 / 10,550	$827,714
28 August 2010	Las Vegas	United States	MGM Grand Garden Arena	13,300 / 13,300	$1,052,585
Europe
24 September 2010	Dublin	Ireland	Aviva Stadium	95,895 / 100,000	$9,971,100
25 September 2010	Dublin	Ireland	Aviva Stadium	95,895 / 100,000	$9,971,100
27 September 2010	Sheffield	England	Motorpoint Arena Sheffield	11,334 / 11,502	$932,280
28 September 2010	Newcastle	England	Metro Radio Arena	—	—
30 September 2010	Nottingham	England	Trent FM Arena	7,687 / 7,951	$642,829
2 October 2010	London	England	Wembley Arena	32,124 / 33,036	$2,944,310
3 October 2010	London	England	Wembley Arena	32,124 / 33,036	$2,944,310
4 October 2010	London	England	Wembley Arena	32,124 / 33,036	$2,944,310
6 October 2010	Manchester	England	Manchester Evening News Arena	—	—
7 October 2010	Manchester	England	Manchester Evening News Arena	—	—
9 October 2010	Birmingham	England	National Indoor Arena	24,334 / 26,370	$2,005,200
10 October 2010	Birmingham	England	National Indoor Arena	24,334 / 26,370	$2,005,200
12 October 2010	Antwerp	Belgium	Sportpaleis	—	—
13 October 2010	Hanover	Germany	TUI Arena	4,207 / 10,701	$391,952
14 October 2010	Cologne	Germany	Lanxess Arena	7,672 / 11,816	$607,346
16 October 2010	Frankfurt	Germany	Festhalle Frankfurt	7,066 / 7,683	$634,773
17 October 2010	Stuttgart	Germany	Porsche-Arena	4,942 / 5,678	$461,742
27 October 2010	Paris	France	Palais Omnisports de Paris-Bercy	—	—
28 October 2010	Arnhem	Netherlands	GelreDome	24,313 / 24,818	$1,944,750
29 October 2010	Toulouse	France	Zénith de Toulouse	—N/a	—N/a
30 October 2010	Barcelona	Spain	Palau Sant Jordi	10,882 / 18,147	$676,437
31 October 2010	Madrid	Spain	Palacio de Deportes de la Comunidad	10,195 / 11,064	$634,489
2 November 2010	Lisbon	Portugal	Pavilhão Atlântico	24,075 / 25,728	$1,761,540
3 November 2010	Lisbon	Portugal	Pavilhão Atlântico	24,075 / 25,728	$1,761,540
North America
23 November 2010	Hershey	United States	Giant Center	7,581 / 8,000	$580,138
24 November 2010	Philadelphia	United States	Wells Fargo Center	10,209 / 11,800	$834,876
26 November 2010	Newark	United States	Prudential Center	12,076 / 12,076	$1,030,196
27 November 2010	Boston	United States	TD Garden	12,227 / 12,227	$1,037,383
28 November 2010	New York City	United States	Madison Square Garden	—	—
30 November 2010	Washington, D.C.	United States	Verizon Center	10,793 / 11,600	$917,735
1 December 2010	Buffalo	United States	HSBC Arena	11,308 / 11,308	$879,915
3 December 2010	Grand Rapids	United States	Van Andel Arena	10,460 / 10,460	$790,473
4 December 2010	Rosemont	United States	Allstate Arena	—N/a	—N/a
5 December 2010	Nashville	United States	Bridgestone Arena	10,182 / 10,182	$787,624
7 December 2010	North Little Rock	United States	Verizon Arena	6,216 / 6,750	$371,186
8 December 2010	Oklahoma City	United States	Oklahoma City Arena	8,004 / 8,004	$643,340
11 December 2010	Anaheim	United States	Honda Center	11,666 / 11,666	$1,030,156
13 December 2010	Los Angeles	United States	Staples Center	—	—
Oceania
11 February 2011	Brisbane	Australia	Brisbane Entertainment Centre	19,668 / 19,668	$2,257,180
12 February 2011	Brisbane	Australia	Brisbane Entertainment Centre	19,668 / 19,668	$2,257,180
14 February 2011	Sydney	Australia	Acer Arena	39,385 / 39,385	$4,674,100
15 February 2011	Sydney	Australia	Acer Arena	39,385 / 39,385	$4,674,100
17 February 2011	Sydney	Australia	Acer Arena	39,385 / 39,385	$4,674,100
19 February 2011	Sydney	Australia	Sydney Entertainment Centre	9,849 / 9,849	$1,167,740
22 February 2011	Melbourne	Australia	Rod Laver Arena	44,171 / 45,468	$4,880,720
23 February 2011	Melbourne	Australia	Rod Laver Arena	44,171 / 45,468	$4,880,720
25 February 2011	Melbourne	Australia	Rod Laver Arena	44,171 / 45,468	$4,880,720
26 February 2011	Melbourne	Australia	Rod Laver Arena	44,171 / 45,468	$4,880,720
28 February 2011	Adelaide	Australia	Adelaide Entertainment Centre	14,750 / 14,750	$1,795,800
1 March 2011	Adelaide	Australia	Adelaide Entertainment Centre	14,750 / 14,750	$1,795,800
4 March 2011	Guildford	Australia	Sandalford Wines Estate	20,300 / 20,300	$3,724,440
5 March 2011	Guildford	Australia	Sandalford Wines Estate	20,300 / 20,300	$3,724,440
6 March 2011	Margaret River	Australia	Sandalford Margaret River	10,069 / 10,069	$1,835,580
Asia
9 March 2011	Singapore		Singapore Indoor Stadium	8,376 / 8,376	$1,252,040
11 March 2011	Hong Kong		Hong Kong Convention Centre	6,613 / 6,613	$981,666
13 March 2011	Shah Alam	Malaysia	Stadium Malawati	—N/a	—N/a
North America
1 June 2011	Austin	United States	Frank Erwin Center	8,371 / 9,000	$643,613
3 June 2011	Memphis	United States	FedExForum	6,228 / 6,500	$428,398
4 June 2011	Louisville	United States	KFC Yum! Center	7,494 / 8,600	$550,479
5 June 2011	Milwaukee	United States	Bradley Center	7,764 / 8,750	$583,258
7 June 2011	Toledo	United States	Huntington Center	7,293 / 7,293	$523,089
8 June 2011	Wilkes-Barre	United States	Mohegan Sun Arena at Casey Plaza	6,531 / 7,000	$469,961
10 June 2011	Pittsburgh	United States	Consol Energy Center	8,831 / 9,200	$687,895
11 June 2011	Atlantic City	United States	Boardwalk Hall	10,950 / 10,950	$844,807
12 June 2011	Providence	United States	Dunkin' Donuts Center	7,359 / 8,000	$569,383
14 June 2011	Uncasville	United States	Mohegan Sun Arena	6,028 / 8,090	$591,535
16 June 2011	Uncasville	United States	Mohegan Sun Arena	6,028 / 8,090	$591,535
17 June 2011	Manchester	United States	Verizon Wireless Arena	7,278 / 7,800	$578,120
18 June 2011	Albany	United States	Times Union Center	7,904 / 7,904	$602,293
21 June 2011	Springfield	United States	JQH Arena	7,551 / 7,551	$539,374
23 June 2011	Des Moines	United States	Wells Fargo Arena	7,342 / 7,600	$515,506
24 June 2011	Moline	United States	iWireless Center	6,788 / 7,200	$470,819
25 June 2011	Duluth	United States	AMSOIL Arena	5,368 / 5,368	$414,132
5 August 2011	Kelowna	Canada	Prospera Place	—N/a	—N/a
6 August 2011	Victoria	Canada	Save-On-Foods Memorial Centre	—N/a	—N/a
8 August 2011	Edmonton	Canada	Rexall Place	9,400 / 11,600	$802,563
10 August 2011	Spokane	United States	Spokane Veterans Memorial Arena	6,161 / 7,000	$412,369
11 August 2011	Boise	United States	Taco Bell Arena	—N/a	—N/a
13 August 2011	San Jose	United States	HP Pavilion at San Jose	8,484 / 9,000	$680,573
14 August 2011	Fresno	United States	Save Mart Center	6,231 / 7,000	$434,805
16 August 2011	El Paso	United States	Don Haskins Center	7,184 / 7,184	$536,474
Latin America
18 August 2011	Monterrey	Mexico	Monterrey Arena	—N/a	—N/a
20 August 2011	Mexico City	Mexico	National Auditorium	46,342 / 47,102 (Note: The score data is combined from the shows held at the National Auditorium from 20–21 August 2011, 9–11 March 2012, respectively.)	$3,315,196
21 August 2011	Mexico City	Mexico	National Auditorium	46,342 / 47,102	$3,315,196
9 March 2012	Mexico City	Mexico	National Auditorium	46,342 / 47,102	$3,315,196
10 March 2012	Mexico City	Mexico	National Auditorium	46,342 / 47,102	$3,315,196
11 March 2012	Mexico City	Mexico	National Auditorium	46,342 / 47,102	$3,315,196
17 March 2012	Santiago	Chile	Movistar Arena	—N/a	—N/a
18 March 2012	Santiago	Chile	Movistar Arena	—N/a	—N/a
21 March 2012	Rosario	Argentina	Salón Metropolitano	—N/a	—N/a
22 March 2012	Córdoba	Argentina	Orfeo Superdomo	—N/a	—N/a
24 March 2012	Buenos Aires	Argentina	Luna Park	—N/a	—N/a
25 March 2012	Buenos Aires	Argentina	Luna Park	—N/a	—N/a
26 March 2012	Buenos Aires	Argentina	Luna Park	—N/a	—N/a
31 March 2012	Rio de Janeiro	Brazil	HSBC Arena	9,892 / 9,892	$951,660
1 April 2012	São Paulo	Brazil	Via Funchal	4,978 / 4,978	$1,008,190
Europe
15 April 2012	Herning	Denmark	Jyske Bank Boxen	—N/a	—N/a
17 April 2012	Oslo	Norway	Oslo Spektrum	—N/a	—N/a
18 April 2012	Stockholm	Sweden	Ericsson Globe	—N/a	—N/a
20 April 2012	Helsinki	Finland	Hartwall Areena	—N/a	—N/a
21 April 2012	Tallinn	Estonia	Saku Suurhall	—N/a	—N/a
23 April 2012	Gdańsk	Poland	Ergo Arena	—N/a	—N/a
25 April 2012	Cologne	Germany	Lanxess Arena	—N/a	—N/a
26 April 2012	Rotterdam	Netherlands	Sportpaleis van Ahoy	—N/a	—N/a
27 April 2012	Rotterdam	Netherlands	Sportpaleis van Ahoy	—N/a	—N/a
Africa
1 May 2012	Cape Town	South Africa	Grand Arena	—N/a	—N/a
2 May 2012	Cape Town	South Africa	Grand Arena	—N/a	—N/a
3 May 2012	Cape Town	South Africa	Grand Arena	—N/a	—N/a
5 May 2012	North West	South Africa	Sun City Super Bowl	—N/a	—N/a
6 May 2012	North West	South Africa	Sun City Super Bowl	—N/a	—N/a

=== Cancellations and rescheduled shows ===
18 May 2010	Paris, France	Palais Omnisports de Paris-Bercy	Rescheduled for 27 October 2010
19 May 2010	Arnhem, Netherlands	GelreDome	Rescheduled for 28 October 2010
18 October 2010	Salzburg, Austria	Salzburgarena	Cancelled
21 October 2010	Turin, Italy	PalaTorino	Cancelled
22 October 2010	Florence, Italy	Nelson Mandela Forum	Cancelled
23 October 2010	Rome, Italy	PalaLottomatica	Cancelled
15 June 2011	Uncasville, Connecticut	Mohegan Sun Arena	Rescheduled to 16 June 2011

== Critical reception ==
Overall, Bublé received positive reviews from music critics in the United States, Canada and Australia. Scott Mervis (Pittsburgh Post-Gazette) was not impressed by Bublé's vocal prowess but felt he charmed the audience at the Peterson Events Center. He continues, "Nonetheless, he was greeted with open arms because he does offer a respite from modern-day rock and R&B. His adoring, mostly female fans got to enjoy timeless classics, rarely heard in arenas, from a charming, handsome man with sincere enthusiasm for the music. That counts for something." Jeff Hahne (Creative Loafing) called the performance at the Time Warner Cable Arena entertaining stating, "His talent for singing is matched with his abilities as an overall entertainer — silly anecdotes, jokes about his band and an unabashed honesty and humility are what make his shows so fun to watch. He addressed the crowd after the second song and asked how many men there had been dragged by their wives […] He then told the crowd he was looking to have a party — they can dance if they'd like or stand up and scream, but if someone behind you says to sit down because they're trying to see the Michael Bublé concert, turn around and tell them to go f… themselves."

James Reaney (London Free Press) called the Canadian crooner's concert at the John Labatt Centre a mixture of warmth and insanity declaring, "[Bublé] can play it beautifully straight. The man who followed Monday's sweet and soulful version of Van Morrison's 'Crazy Love' with a reverential take on Hoagy Carmichael's 'Georgia on My Mind', complete with a thrilling high-note solo from his band's trumpeter, and then pulled off Stevie Wonder's 'For Once in My Life' the way Nelson Riddle might have arranged it for Frank Sinatra is not simply a showbiz kidder." Jason MacNeil (Jam!) gave the singer's performance at the Air Canada Centre three and a half out of five stars commenting, "But Buble's first real highlight might have been following the schmaltzy 'I've Got The World On A String' when he poured himself into the tender and heartfelt 'Best Of Me', almost appearing to get choked up at some points in the song. The song led nicely into a strong cover of Van Morrison's 'Crazy Love'."

John Terauds (Toronto Star) called the same show a "work of art". He further notates, "The crooner loves to chat, and provided witty — sometimes overly personal — introductions for his accomplished band members, including a spectacular jazz wind octet. He made fun of his geeky musical predilections. He enjoyed a moment of homage to Michael Jackson." Darryl Sterdan (Winnipeg Sun) called Bublé's concert at the MTS Centre entertainment with a capitol "E", giving the performance four out of five stars, he writes, "[Bublé] may be no Sinatra — and in his defence, he claims he's never wanted to be — but he openly pays his respects to the singers and writers who blazed the trail he follows."

Jim Carnes (The Sacramento Bee) was pleased by Bublé's performance at the ARCO Arena calling the concert fun and warm. He remarks, "Backed by a fine 13-piece big band, Bublé created a surprisingly intimate club feel. Video screens gave closeups of individual musicians as well as the star. It was surprising, when he had the house lights brought up, to see just how many people were there." Kate Lucas (The Orange County Register) saw Bublé's performance at the Honda Center as a "knockout" calling the singer talented and charismatic. She further affirms, "From his powerful opening with 'Cry Me a River' to a playful take on 'Twist and Shout' as giant beach balls bounced around the crowd, Bublé let down the emotional floodgates, entwining tales of difficult breakups with jubilation over his coming nuptials (he weds Argentine actress and model Luisana Lopilato on April 6) and leading us onto the roller-coaster of his life lately. It makes sense that the show begins so dramatically, with the silhouette of a conductor and orchestra (reminiscent of the beginning of Disney's Fantasia) and an intense horn intro yielding to eruptive screams as Bublé appears and pyrotechnics scatter stars from above the stage."

Nathanael Cooper (The Courier-Mail) commended Bublé's performance at the Brisbane Entertainment Centre concluding, "As charming as he is a phenomenal singer, [Bublé] peppered his show with amusing chats about everything from his wife to the wives who had dragged their husbands to the show. Clearly, an artist who is well in touch with what his fans want, he ensured the show delivered exactly what they wanted." Paul Cashmere (Undercover FM) gave the singer four and a half out of five stars for his show at the Rod Laver Arena. He writes, "[Bublé] was entertaining, he was funny and he was one hell of a performer. Early into the show, he invited a lady to come forward and get her sign signed. 'Look what I wrote,' he said when she returned to her seat. 'It says 'I'm your slut'. That pretty much set the tone of the night. It was a good time to be had by all."
