= Higher Tour =

2022–23 concert tour by Michael Bublé

- World tour by Michael Bublé
- Associated album: Higher
- Start date: August 8, 2022
- End date: October 14, 2023
- Legs: 4
- No. of shows: 38 in North America; 11 in Oceania; 15 in Latin America; 41 in Europe; 105 total

Michael Bublé concert chronology
- An Evening with Michael Bublé (2019–2022); Higher Tour (2022–2023)

The Higher Tour was the seventh concert tour by Canadian singer Michael Bublé, in support of his eleventh studio album, Higher (2022). The tour began on August 8, 2022 in Duluth and ended in Mexico City on October 14, 2023.

== Set list ==
1. "Feeling Good"
2. "Haven't Met You Yet"
3. "L-O-V-E"
4. "Such a Night"
5. "Sway"
6. "When You're Smiling (The Whole World Smiles With You)"
7. "Home"
8. "Everything"
9. "Higher"
10. "To Love Somebody"
11. "Hold On"
12. "Smile"
13. "I'll Never Not Love You"
14. "Fever"
15. "One Night"
16. "All Shook Up"
17. "Can't Help Falling in Love"
18. "You're the First, the Last, My Everything"
19. "It's a Beautiful Day"
20. "Bring It On Home to Me”

Encore

1. "Save the Last Dance for Me"
2. "How Sweet It Is (To Be Loved by You)"
3. "Cry Me a River"
4. "Always On My Mind"

== Tour dates ==
List of shows
Date	City	Country	Venue	Attendance	Revenue
North America
August 8, 2022	Duluth	United States	Gas South Arena	8,712 / 9,219	$886,124
August 10, 2022	Orlando	United States	Amway Center	8,528 / 8,975	$1,126,109
August 12, 2022	Sunrise	United States	FLA Live Arena	11,152 / 11,152	$1,668,169
August 13, 2022	Tampa	United States	Amalie Arena	11,389 / 11,389	$1,588,798
August 14, 2022	North Charleston	United States	North Charleston Coliseum	7,268 / 7,268	$691,871
August 16, 2022	Nashville	United States	Bridgestone Arena	7,774 / 8,354	$959,438
August 18, 2022	New York City	United States	Madison Square Garden	10,965 / 10,965	$1,415,022
August 29, 2022	Washington, D.C.	United States	Capital One Arena	9,286 / 10,118	$850,514
August 30, 2022	Philadelphia	United States	Wells Fargo Center	—	—
September 1, 2022	Pittsburgh	United States	PPG Paints Arena	8,483 / 9,311	$891,410
September 2, 2022	Rosemont	United States	Allstate Arena	10,583 / 10,583	$1,361,992
September 7, 2022	Saint Paul	United States	Xcel Energy Center	9,335 / 9,956	$1,030,189
September 9, 2022	St. Louis	United States	Enterprise Center	8,347 / 9,121	$917,109
September 10, 2022	Kansas City	United States	T-Mobile Center	7,632 / 8,371	$831,113
September 11, 2022	Tulsa	United States	BOK Center	7,094 / 7,781	$757,387
September 13, 2022	Houston	United States	Toyota Center	7,504 / 7,969	$1,014,375
September 14, 2022	Austin	United States	Moody Center	7,508 / 8,305	$866,829
September 16, 2022	Dallas	United States	American Airlines Center	11,585 / 11,585	$1,393,522
September 17, 2022	San Antonio	United States	AT&T Center	9,814 / 10,185	$1,126,487
September 20, 2022	Phoenix	United States	Footprint Center	10,135 / 10,135	$1,232,867
September 21, 2022	San Diego	United States	Pechanga Arena	7,823 / 8,446	$838,746
September 23, 2022	Los Angeles	United States	Crypto.com Arena	9,500 / 9,500	$1,248,837
September 24, 2022	Sacramento	United States	Golden 1 Center	9,427 / 9,427	$1,167,053
September 27, 2022	Portland	United States	Moda Center	—	—
September 28, 2022	Seattle	United States	Climate Pledge Arena	10,141 / 10,141	$1,201,334
October 1, 2022	Vancouver	Canada	Rogers Arena	—	—
October 4, 2022	Calgary	Canada	Scotiabank Saddledome	—	—
October 5, 2022	Edmonton	Canada	Rogers Place	—	—
October 7, 2022	Winnipeg	Canada	Canada Life Centre	—	—
October 10, 2022	Detroit	United States	Little Caesars Arena	9,805 / 10,454	$1,016,607
October 11, 2022	Buffalo	United States	KeyBank Center	9,816 / 10,455	$956,254
October 12, 2022	Toronto	Canada	Scotiabank Arena	—	—
October 14, 2022	Ottawa	Canada	Canadian Tire Centre	—	—
October 15, 2022	Hamilton	Canada	FirstOntario Centre	11,025 / 11,226	$817,203
October 18, 2022	Montreal	Canada	Bell Centre	11,578 / 12,848	$1,023,914
October 19, 2022	Quebec City	Canada	Centre Videotron	9,492 / 9,974	$670,624
October 21, 2022 (Note: These shows was originally scheduled to take place in March 2020 and then March 2021.)	Halifax	Canada	Scotiabank Centre	—	—
October 22, 2022	Moncton	Canada	Avenir Centre	6,380 / 6,380	$634,755
Latin America
November 3, 2022 (Note: These shows were originally scheduled to take place in October 2020 and October – November 2021, but were rescheduled due to the COVID-19 pandemic.)	Rio de Janeiro	Brazil	Jeunesse Arena	7,633 / 8,548	$576,316
November 5, 2022	São Paulo	Brazil	Allianz Parque	51,429 / 59,314	$4,316,967
November 6, 2022	São Paulo	Brazil	Allianz Parque	51,429 / 59,314	$4,316,967
November 8, 2022	Curitiba	Brazil	Arena da Baixada	15,961 / 17,769	$1,049,848
November 12, 2022	Buenos Aires	Argentina	Movistar Arena	8,395 / 8,395	$673,170
November 15, 2022	Santiago	Chile	Movistar Arena	19,130 / 19,130	$1,734,213
November 16, 2022	Santiago	Chile	Movistar Arena	19,130 / 19,130	$1,734,213
Europe
January 27, 2023	Lisbon	Portugal	Altice Arena	—	—
January 30, 2023	Madrid	Spain	WiZink Center	—	—
February 1, 2023	Barcelona	Spain	Palau Sant Jordi	—	—
February 4, 2023	Milan	Italy	Mediolanum Forum	—	—
February 5, 2023	Milan	Italy	Mediolanum Forum	—	—
February 7, 2023	Vienna	Austria	Wiener Stadthalle	—	—
February 8, 2023	Budapest	Hungary	MVM Dome	—	—
February 10, 2023	Kraków	Poland	Tauron Arena	—	—
February 12, 2023	Munich	Germany	Olympiahalle	—	—
February 14, 2023	Cologne	Germany	Lanxess Arena	—	—
February 15, 2023	Oberhausen	Germany	Rudolf Weber-Arena	—	—
February 17, 2023	Hannover	Germany	ZAG-Arena	—	—
February 18, 2023	Mannheim	Germany	SAP Arena	—	—
February 19, 2023	Zürich	Switzerland	Hallenstadion	—	—
March 10, 2023	Stockholm	Sweden	Avicii Arena	—	—
March 12, 2023	Oslo	Norway	Telenor Arena	—	—
March 14, 2023	Copenhagen	Denmark	Royal Arena	—	—
March 15, 2023	Herning	Denmark	Jyske Bank Boxen	—	—
March 17, 2023	Hamburg	Germany	Barclays Arena	—	—
March 18, 2023	Berlin	Germany	Mercedes-Benz Arena	—	—
March 20, 2023	Leipzig	Germany	Quarterback Immobilien Arena	—	—
March 22, 2023	Amsterdam	Netherlands	Ziggo Dome	—	—
March 23, 2023	Antwerp	Belgium	Sportpaleis	—	—
March 24, 2023	Paris	France	Paris La Défense Arena	—	—
March 26, 2023	London	England	The O_{2} Arena	—	—
March 28, 2023	London	England	The O_{2} Arena	—	—
April 21, 2023	Manchester	England	AO Arena	—	—
April 22, 2023	Manchester	England	AO Arena	—	—
April 24, 2023	Leeds	England	First Direct Arena	—	—
April 27, 2023	Glasgow	Scotland	OVO Hydro	—	—
April 28, 2023	Glasgow	Scotland	OVO Hydro	—	—
April 29, 2023	Aberdeen	Scotland	P&J Live	—	—
May 1, 2023	Newcastle	England	Utilita Arena	—	—
May 2, 2023	Newcastle	England	Utilita Arena	—	—
May 4, 2023	Cardiff	Wales	Cardiff International Arena	—	—
May 7, 2023	Nottingham	England	Motorpoint Arena	—	—
May 8, 2023	Nottingham	England	Motorpoint Arena	—	—
May 10, 2023	Birmingham	England	Resorts World Arena	—	—
May 11, 2023	Birmingham	England	Resorts World Arena	—	—
May 13, 2023	Dublin	Ireland	3Arena	—	—
May 14, 2023	Dublin	Ireland	3Arena	—	—
Oceania
June 1, 2023 (Note: Originally scheduled for November 30, 2022)	Newcastle	Australia	Newcastle Entertainment Centre	—	—
June 5, 2023 (Note: Originally scheduled for December 3, 2022)	Perth	Australia	RAC Arena	—	—
June 9, 2023 (Note: Originally scheduled for December 14, 2022)	Sydney	Australia	Qudos Bank Arena	—	—
June 10, 2023 (Note: Originally scheduled for December 15, 2022)	Sydney	Australia	Qudos Bank Arena	—	—
June 13, 2023 (Note: Originally scheduled for December 11, 2022)	Adelaide	Australia	Adelaide Entertainment Centre	—	—
June 14, 2023	Adelaide	Australia	Adelaide Entertainment Centre	—	—
June 16, 2023 (Note: Originally scheduled for December 7, 2022)	Melbourne	Australia	Rod Laver Arena	—	—
June 17, 2023 (Note: Originally scheduled for December 8, 2022)	Melbourne	Australia	Rod Laver Arena	—	—
June 20, 2023 (Note: Originally scheduled for December 17, 2022)	Brisbane	Australia	Brisbane Entertainment Centre	—	—
June 21, 2023 (Note: Originally scheduled for December 18, 2022)	Brisbane	Australia	Brisbane Entertainment Centre	—	—
June 25, 2023	Auckland	New Zealand	Spark Arena	—	—
Latin America
September 28, 2023	San Juan	Puerto Rico	Coliseo de Puerto Rico	—	—
September 30, 2023	La Romana	Dominican Republic	Altos de Chavón	—	—
October 4, 2023	Monterrey	Mexico	Arena Monterrey	—	—
October 7, 2023	Puebla	Mexico	Centro Expositor	—	—
October 9, 2023	Zapopan	Mexico	Auditorio Telmex	—	—
October 12, 2023	Mexico City	Mexico	Arena Ciudad de México	—	—
October 13, 2023	Mexico City	Mexico	Arena Ciudad de México	—	—
October 14, 2023	Mexico City	Mexico	Arena Ciudad de México	—	—
Total				—	—

=== Cancelled shows ===
List of cancelled shows
Date	City	Country	Venue	Reason
March 8, 2023	Tampere	Finland	Nokia Arena	Cancelled
