= Crazy Love (Michael Bublé album) =

Studio album by Michael Bublé
- Released: October 9, 2009
- Recorded: February – August 2009
- Genres: Vocal jazz; traditional pop
- Length: 47:34
- Labels: 143; Reprise
- Producers: David Foster; Bob Rock; Humberto Gatica

Michael Bublé chronology
Michael Bublé Meets Madison Square Garden (2009)	Crazy Love (2009)	Christmas (2011)

Singles from Crazy Love
- 1. "Haven't Met You Yet" Released: August 31, 2009; 2. "Hold On" Released: December 11, 2009; 3. "Baby (You've Got What It Takes)" Released: December 11, 2009; 4. "Cry Me a River" Released: March 8, 2010; 5. "Crazy Love" Released: May 16, 2010; 6. "Hollywood" Released: September 7, 2010

Crazy Love is the sixth studio album by Canadian singer Michael Bublé. It was released by 143 Records and Reprise Records on October 9, 2009. After only three days of sales, it opened atop the Billboard 200 chart with 132,000 copies, making it Bublé's second No. 1 album. Spending the first full week at the top, the album increased in sales to 203,000 copies, staying again at the No. 1 spot on its second week. In Australia, the album debuted at No. 1 on the ARIA Albums Chart and spent six non-consecutive weeks as No. 1. It has since been certified five times Platinum. In the United Kingdom, Crazy Love topped the album charts.

As of October 2018, the album has sold 3.13 million copies in the UK. The album won the award for Best Traditional Pop Vocal Album at the 53rd Grammy Awards.

== Album information ==
The album was recorded over a period of six months in Los Angeles, New York and Vancouver, Bublé's hometown. Produced by David Foster, Bob Rock, and Humberto Gatica, Bublé describes Crazy Love as the "ultimate record about the inevitable roller coaster ride of relationships." The album was named after Van Morrison's 1970 song, "Crazy Love", with a cover version included. Bublé commented on the recording process for the album: "I started this record knowing I was going to record it differently than my previous ones. I dug way deeper and was more introspective on this one. Basically, I sang the truth—made each song autobiographical—and you can definitely hear the difference. I went back to the way my idols made their records. I wanted an organic feel—so people could feel like they were in the studio with me. The musicians and I all sat in the room, recorded it right from the floor and we let the sounds all come together and bleed into one another. It's not contrived. Not too perfect. It just feels really good."

Bublé co-wrote the album's two singles, "Haven't Met You Yet" and "Hold On," with longtime collaborators Alan Chang, and Amy Foster. The first single, "Haven't Met You Yet", was released on August 31, 2009. Weeks before this single, Bublé offered his audience an early glimpse at Crazy Love with a playful remix of "Baby (You've Got What It Takes)." The opening part for the single "Cry Me a River" was written by Bublé in a James Bond-like theme because he wanted the song to sound "really cinematic, really over the top and bombastic". "Cry Me a River" was used in the BBC's advertising for the 2010 Winter Olympics in Vancouver. The track "Stardust" was recorded in one take. On 18 April 2010, Bublé took home four Juno Awards for Juno Fan Choice Award, Single of the Year – "Haven't Met You Yet", Album of the Year – Crazy Love, and Pop Album of the Year – Crazy Love, and two Juno nominations for Artist of the Year and Songwriter of the Year. Crazy Love producers David Foster and Bob Rock both received two separate nominations of their own for the Jack Richardson Producer of the Year Award, with Bob Rock winning the award.

== Release ==
The album initially was planned for release on October 13, 2009; however, it was released four days early, in order to coincide with Bublé's appearance on The Oprah Winfrey Show, where Bublé performed the album's first single, "Haven't Met You Yet". On August 23, 2010, it was confirmed that a special edition of Crazy Love would be released in the fall. On October 10, 2010, the re-release was confirmed to become available on October 18, 2010, in Europe, and on October 25, 2010, in the U.S. The re-release contains three new tracks, including the single "Hollywood", which was co-written by Bublé and Canadian songwriter Robert G. Scott. The album also includes live versions of songs from the album's previous release. In Europe, the re-release comes in the form of a bonus disc included with the original version of the album, whereas in America, the special edition was released in the form of an EP titled Hollywood: The Deluxe EP. A special edition of the album, including a bonus remix CD, making-of DVD and 32-page photo album, was made available only through Bublé's official online store.

== Critical reception ==
Professional ratings
Aggregate scores
Source	Rating
Metacritic	75/100
Review scores
Source	Rating
About.com	2/5 stars
AllMusic	4/5 stars
BBC Online	(favorable)
Billboard	(favorable)
Blogcritics	(favorable)
The Boston Globe	(favorable)
Entertainment Weekly	B
The New York Times	(favorable)
Los Angeles Times	2/4 stars

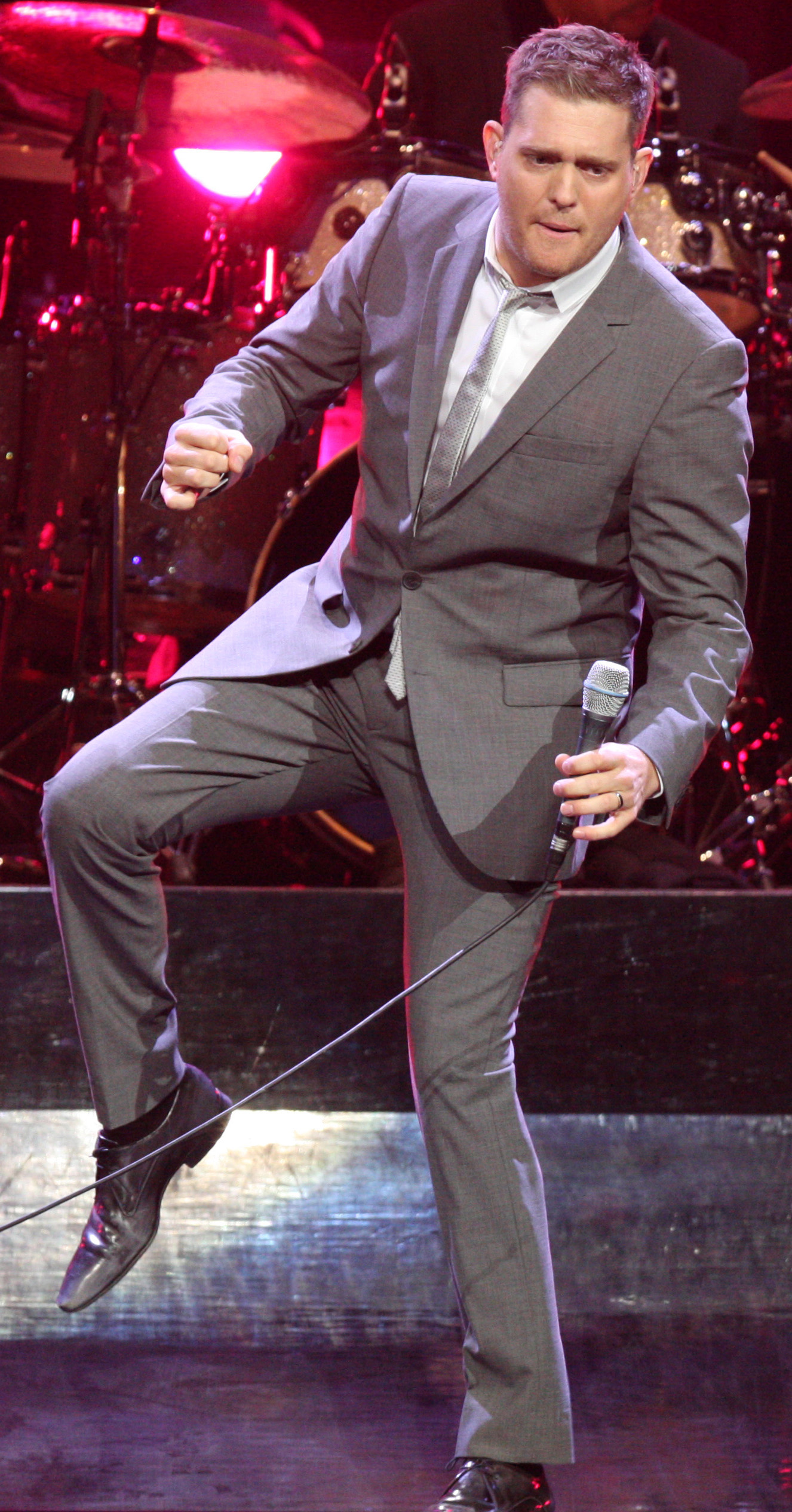
Bublé performing in Sydney as a part of the Crazy Love Tour in February 2011

Crazy Love received generally positive reviews from music critics upon its release. At Metacritic, which assigns a normalized rating out of 100 given to reviews from mainstream critics, the album received an average score of 75, which indicates "generally favorable reviews". Matt Collar of AllMusic gave the album four out of five stars and commended the album for being Bublé's "most stylistically wide-ranging album", adding that it is also "his brightest, poppiest, and most fun [album]". Gary Graff of Billboard commended the album's "curveballs", noting that they gave "the album some additional cheek". Graff concluded the review, writing "Crazy Love is another step in Bublé's creation of his own kind of songbook, and there's nothing necessarily crazy about that." Stephen Holden of The New York Times complimented Bublé for being "appreciative of the past but not reverential" and also noted that "he juxtaposes pre-rock, rock and soul classics without favoring one style over another." Holden concluded the review with "What the creators imparted with an edge of warning, Mr. Bublé turns into a whoop-it-up celebration of nightlife and the mating game, in which the thrill and excitement are worth the risks."

Mikael Wood of Entertainment Weekly gave Crazy Love a B, saying that "the neo-Rat Pack crooner makes a few too many soft-rock concessions on his new studio disc." Despite this, Wood also stated that "there's no denying the sexy-jerk swagger Bublé brings". Sarah Rodman of The Boston Globe claimed that the album's strength came from "Bublé's swagger, since the arrangements tend to favor the predictable, from swinging orchestras to cocktail piano fizz." However, Rodman also noted that "the Canadian singer knows his way around the retro-soul movement as well as the Rat Pack era". Music critic Adrian Edwards of BBC gave a positive review of the album, claiming that "each song on this flamboyant new CD thrills the ear as though it were a live performance" and further noted that "This wonderful album would surely have been voted 'ring-a-ding-ding' by Frank and Dean!" Chris Barton of the Los Angeles Times gave the album two out of four stars, stating that "its mix of brassy standards and tastefully done originals from the world of jazz and pop surely will give those familiar with Bublé's work pretty much exactly what they want." He went on to say that "The album's polished, middle-of-the-road approach isn't exactly for everyone, but its agreeable heart doesn't hit any sour notes, either." Kit O'Toole of Blogcritics gave a favorable review of the album, noting that "Crazy Love also marks Bublé's welcome attempt to expand his range, mostly to positive effect" and further noted that the album "contains both standards and modern songs, proving that Bublé can handle both with ease." Charlie Christenson of About.com gave the album two out of five stars, noting that "Bublé stomps all over the fine line between jazz and pop, with mixed results." Despite this, Christenson complimented Bublé for having "good timing, a sense of the lyric, and spot-on intonation."

Mark Beaumont, writing for NME in 2016, included it on his list of eight of the all-time best-selling albums in the UK have no redeeming features whatsoever.

== Awards ==
Apart from its critical and commercial success, Crazy Love received a number of awards and nominations. In 2010, the album won a Juno Award for Album of the Year and Pop Album of the Year, while "Haven't Met You Yet" won an award for Single of the Year. Bob Rock, one of the album producers, won the Jack Richardson Producer of the Year Award for producing "Haven't Met You Yet" and "Baby (You've Got What It Takes)", beating David Foster who produced "Cry Me a River" and "All of Me". At the 53rd Grammy Awards, the album won a Grammy Award for Best Traditional Pop Vocal Album. "Haven't Met You Yet" was also nominated for Best Male Pop Vocal Performance, but lost to "Just the Way You Are" by Bruno Mars.

== Promotion ==
Promotion for Crazy Love began when Bublé was interviewed by George Stroumboulopoulos on the CBC Television show The Hour on October 7, 2009. Two days later, Bublé made an appearance on The Oprah Winfrey Show, where he was interviewed by Oprah Winfrey and later performed "Haven't Met You Yet". On October 13, 2009, he talked about the album and later performed "Haven't Met You Yet" and "All of Me" on The Today Show. Bublé then went on a series of press and television appearances in Europe, appearing on the German television show Yes We Can Dance (October 16), Che tempo che fa (October 18), Heart Radio Show (October 20), and BBC Radio 2 (October 21). He then made an appearance on the UK talent show The X Factor (October 25), where he performed "Cry Me a River". On November 3, he made an appearance on the Late Show with David Letterman, where he sang selections from David Letterman's Top Ten List. Bublé would continue to make appearances throughout the month of November, appearing on The Rachel Ray Show (November 4), Dancing with the Stars (November 10), and Australian Idol (November 15), where he served as a mentor and a guest judge. On December 2, 2009, Bublé took part in the annual Rockefeller Tree Lighting and also served as a guest co-host for Live! with Regis and Kelly that same day. Five days later, he performed "Cry Me a River" in front of Queen Elizabeth and her husband, Prince Philip, as part of the annual Royal Variety Performance gala event. Throughout the month of December, Bublé also made appearances on Wetten Dass..? (December 5), SWR3 (December 9), The Late Late Show (December 11), and The X Factor (December 12), where he sang with Stacey Solomon.

== Track listing ==
Crazy Love – Standard edition
No.	Title	Writer(s)	Length
1.	"Cry Me a River"	Arthur Hamilton	4:14
2.	"All of Me"	Gerald Marks, Seymour Simons	3:07
3.	"Georgia on My Mind"	Hoagy Carmichael, Stuart Gorrell	3:08
4.	"Crazy Love"	Van Morrison	3:31
5.	"Haven't Met You Yet"	Michael Bublé, Alan Chang, Amy S. Foster	4:05
6.	"All I Do Is Dream of You"	Nacio Herb Brown, Arthur Freed	2:32
7.	"Hold On"	Michael Bublé, Alan Chang, Amy Foster	4:05
8.	"Heartache Tonight"	Don Henley, Glenn Frey, Bob Seger, JD Souther	3:52
9.	"You're Nobody till Somebody Loves You"	Russ Morgan, Larry Stock, James Cavanaugh	3:07
10.	"Baby (You've Got What It Takes)" (featuring Sharon Jones & The Dap-Kings)	Clyde Otis, Murray Stein	3:20
11.	"At This Moment"	Billy Vera	4:35
12.	"Stardust" (featuring Naturally 7)	Hoagy Carmichael, Mitchell Parish	3:13
13.	"Whatever It Takes" (featuring Ron Sexsmith)	Ron Sexsmith	4:35
Total length:			47:34

Crazy Love – European bonus track
No.	Title	Writer(s)	Length
14.	"Some Kind of Wonderful"	Gerry Goffin, Carole King	3:05
Total length:			50:38

Crazy Love – Japanese edition bonus tracks
No.	Title	Writer(s)	Length
14.	"Some Kind of Wonderful" (Non-album track)	Gerry Goffin, Carole King	3:05
15.	"Haven't Met You Yet" (Instrumental)	Michael Bublé, Alan Chang, Amy S. Foster	4:05
Total length:			54:43

Crazy Love – deluxe edition bonus DVD
No.	Title	Length
1.	"The Making of Crazy Love"	25:00

Crazy Love – Amazon.com MP3 exclusive bonus track
No.	Title	Writer(s)	Length
14.	"Relax Max" (featuring Naturally 7)	Al Frisch, Sid Wayne	3:29

Crazy Love – Japanese bonus track / Limited edition bonus DVD
No.	Title	Writer(s)	Length
14.	"Some Kind of Wonderful"	Gerry Goffin, Carole King	3:05
15.	"The Making of Crazy Love" (video)		25:00
Total length:			75:38

Crazy Love – iTunes Store deluxe edition bonus tracks
No.	Title	Writer(s)	Length
14.	"Some Kind of Wonderful" (Non-album track)	Gerry Goffin, Carole King	3:05
15.	"Haven't Met You Yet" (Instrumental)	Michael Bublé, Alan Chang, Amy S. Foster	4:05
16.	"Haven't Met You Yet" (Studio version)	Michael Bublé, Alan Chang, Amy S. Foster	4:05
17.	"Pennies from Heaven" (Non-album track)	Arthur Johnston, Johnny Burke	3:15

Crazy Love – fan club edition bonus disc
No.	Title	Length
1.	"Home" (International Pop Mix)	3:42
2.	"Spider-Man Theme" (Junkie XL Remix)	3:07
3.	"It Had Better Be Tonight (Meglio Stasera)" (Zoned Out Mix)	3:15
4.	"Save The Last Dance For Me" (StarCity Remix)	3:36
5.	"Comin' Home Baby" (Duet with Boyz II Men) (Frank Popp Remix))	3:09
6.	"Sway" (Ralphi's Salsation Edit)	3:08
7.	"Lost" (International Pop Mix)	3:26
8.	"Everything" (Bob Rock Mix)	3:35

Crazy Love – hollywood edition: bonus disc (america)
No.	Title	Writer(s)	Length
1.	"Hollywood"	Michael Bublé, Robert G. Scott	4:13
2.	"At This Moment" (Live)	Billy Vera	4:31
3.	"Some Kind of Wonderful"	Gerry Goffin, Carole King	3:05
4.	"End of May"	Tim Seely	3:53
5.	"Me & Mrs. Jones" (Live)	Kenny Gamble, Leon Huff, Cary Gilbert	3:43
6.	"Haven't Met You Yet" (Live)	Michael Bublé, Alan Chang, Amy S. Foster	5:20
7.	"Heartache Tonight" (Live)	Don Henley, Glenn Frey, Bob Seger, JD Souther	3:46
8.	"Best of Me"	David Foster, Jeremy Lubbock, Richard Marx	4:33
Total length:			33:12

Crazy Love – hollywood edition: bonus disc (europe)
No.	Title	Writer(s)	Length
1.	"Hollywood"	Michael Bublé, Robert G. Scott	4:13
2.	"At This Moment" (Live)	Billy Vera	4:31
3.	"Haven't Met You Yet" (Live)	Michael Bublé, Alan Chang, Amy S. Foster	5:20
4.	"End of May"	Tim Seely	3:53
5.	"Me & Mrs. Jones" (Live)	Kenny Gamble, Leon Huff, Cary Gilbert	3:43
6.	"Twist & Shout" (Live)	Phil Medley, Bert Russell	1:52
7.	"Heartache Tonight" (Live)	Don Henley, Glenn Frey, Bob Seger, JD Souther	3:46
8.	"Best of Me"	David Foster, Jeremy Lubbock, Richard Marx	4:33
Total length:			32:00

Crazy Love – expanded edition
No.	Title	Writer(s)	Length
1.	"Cry Me a River"	Arthur Hamilton	4:14
2.	"All of Me"	Gerald Marks, Seymour Simons	3:07
3.	"Georgia on My Mind"	Hoagy Carmichael, Stuart Gorrell	3:08
4.	"Crazy Love"	Van Morrison	3:31
5.	"Haven't Met You Yet"	Michael Bublé, Alan Chang, Amy S. Foster	4:05
6.	"All I Do Is Dream of You"	Nacio Herb Brown, Arthur Freed	2:32
7.	"Hold On"	Michael Bublé, Alan Chang, Amy Foster	4:05
8.	"Heartache Tonight"	Don Henley, Glenn Frey, Bob Seger, JD Souther	3:52
9.	"You're Nobody till Somebody Loves You"	Russ Morgan, Larry Stock, James Cavanaugh	3:07
10.	"Baby (You've Got What It Takes)" (featuring Sharon Jones and The Dap-Kings)	Clyde Otis, Murray Stein	3:20
11.	"Hollywood"	Michael Bublé, Robert G. Scott	4:13
12.	"At This Moment"	Billy Vera	4:35
13.	"Stardust" (featuring Naturally 7)	Hoagy Carmichael, Mitchell Parish	3:13
14.	"Whatever It Takes" (featuring Ron Sexsmith)	Ron Sexsmith	4:35
Total length:			51:47

== Personnel ==
Musicians

- Michael Bublé – vocals
- David Foster – keyboards (1, 6, 8, 11, 13)
- Jochem van der Saag – programming (1, 2, 3, 6, 8, 11, 13), sound design (1, 2, 3, 6, 8, 11, 13), blues harp (8)
- Tamir Hendelman – acoustic piano (2, 3)
- Alan Chang – acoustic piano (4, 5, 9, 12, 14), celesta (12), glockenspiel (14)
- Victor Axelrod – keyboards (10, 14), acoustic piano (10, 14)
- Dean Parks – guitar (1, 3, 6, 13)
- Michael Thompson – guitar (1, 8, 11)
- Graham Dector – guitar (2)
- Rusty Anderson – guitar (4, 5, 7)
- Michael Landau – guitar (4, 5, 7), guitar solo (4)
- Keith Scott – guitar (4, 5, 7), additional guitar (5)
- Joel Shearer – guitar (4, 5, 7)
- Eric Knight – guitar (9, 12)
- Thomas Brenneck – guitar (10, 14)
- Binky Griptite – guitar (10, 14)
- Ramón Stagnaro – guitar (13)
- Brian Bromberg – bass (1, 2, 3, 6, 8, 13)
- Paul Bushnell – bass (4, 5, 7)
- Craig Polasko – bass (9)
- Nick Movshon – bass (10, 14)
- Nathan East – bass (11)
- Vinnie Colaiuta – drums (1, 11, 13)
- Peter Erskine – drums (2, 6)
- Joe LaBarbera – drums (3, 6)
- Josh Freese – drums (4, 5, 7)
- John Robinson – drums (8)
- Robert Perkins – drums (9)
- Homer Steinweiss – drums (10, 14)
- Rafael Padilla – percussion (1, 2, 6, 11, 13)
- Lenny Castro – percussion (4, 5, 7, 10, 14)
- Fernando Velez – percussion (10, 14)
- Campbell Ryga – alto saxophone (9)
- Jacob Rodriguez – baritone saxophone (4, 5, 7, 9, 14), saxophone (10)
- Ian Hendrickson-Smith – baritone saxophone (10)
- Mike Allen – tenor saxophone (4, 5, 7, 9, 14), saxophone (10)
- Steve Kaldested – tenor saxophone (9)
- Neal Sugarman – tenor saxophone (10)
- Rob Wilkerson – saxophone (9)
- Neil Nicholson – bass trombone (9)
- Nick Vayenas – trombone (4, 5, 7, 9, 14)
- Jeremy Berkman – trombone (9)
- Joshua Brown – trombone (9)
- Justin Ray – trumpet (4, 5, 7, 9, 10, 14)
- Rick Baptist – flugelhorn (5)
- Bryan Lipps – trumpet (9)
- Jumaane Smith – trumpet (9)
- Brad Turner – trumpet (9)
- Dave Guy – trumpet (10)
- Tom Colclough – clarinet (12)
- Angie Fisher – backing vocals (4, 10, 14)
- O'Nita Hutton – backing vocals (4, 10, 14)
- Jason Moralis – backing vocals (4, 10, 14)
- Tiffany Smith – backing vocals (4, 10, 14)
- Naturally 7 – backing vocals (6)
- Bryan Adams – backing vocals (7)
- Sharon Jones – vocals (10)
- John Castellano – additional vocals (10)
- Teresa Dowin – additional vocals (10)
- Saundra Williams – additional vocals (10)
- Ron Sexsmith – backing vocals (13)

Naturally 7

- Rod Eldridge – trumpet (12), scratches (12), first tenor vocals (12)
- Garfield Buckley – harmonica (12), second tenor vocals (12)
- Warren Thomas – guitar (12), clarinet (12), third tenor vocals (12)
- Jamal Reed – electric guitar (12), fourth tenor vocals
- Dwight Stewart – second baritone vocals
- Roger Thomas – first baritone vocals, rap
- Armand "Hops" Hutton - bass vocals

Arrangements

- Michael Bublé – arrangements (1, 4, 5, 7, 10, 14), horn arrangements (10)
- David Foster – arrangements (1, 3, 6, 8, 11, 13)
- Jochem van der Saag – arrangements (1, 8)
- William Ross – string arrangements (1, 13), arrangements (3)
- Billy Byers – original arrangements (2)
- Quincy Jones – original arrangements (2)
- Myles Collins – transcription adaptation (2)
- Alan Chang – arrangements (4, 5, 7, 12), string arrangements (12)
- Bob Rock – arrangements (4, 5, 7, 10, 14)
- Lou Pomanti – string arrangements (4, 5, 7, 10, 14), horn arrangements (5, 14)
- Bill Holman – orchestration (6)
- John Clayton – arrangements (8)
- Humberto Gatica – arrangements (9, 12)
- Justin Ray – horn and string arrangements (9)
- Gabriel Roth – arrangements (10, 14), horn arrangements (10)
- Dave Guy – horn arrangements (10)
- Ian Hendrickson-Smith – horn arrangements (10, 14)
- Neal Sugarman – horn arrangements (10, 14)
- Jerry Hey – arrangements (11)
- Hops Hutton – vocal arrangements (12)

== Charts ==
=== Weekly charts ===
Weekly chart performance for Crazy Love
Chart (2009–2012)	Peak position
Australian Albums (ARIA)	1
Austrian Albums (Ö3 Austria)	8
Belgian Albums (Ultratop Flanders)	5
Belgian Albums (Ultratop Wallonia)	3
Canadian Albums (Billboard)	1
Danish Albums (Hitlisten)	4
Dutch Albums (Album Top 100)	2
Finnish Albums (Suomen virallinen lista)	12
French Albums (SNEP)	5
German Albums (Offizielle Top 100)	5
Hungarian Albums (MAHASZ)	36
Irish Albums (IRMA)	1
Italian Albums (FIMI)	1
Japanese Albums (Oricon)	32
Mexican Albums (Top 100 Mexico)	10
New Zealand Albums (RMNZ)	3
Norwegian Albums (VG-lista)	20
Polish Albums (ZPAV)	8
Portuguese Albums (AFP)	5
Scottish Albums (Official Charts)	1
South African Albums (RISA)	2
Spanish Albums (Promusicae)	7
Swedish Albums (Sverigetopplistan)	17
Swiss Albums (Schweizer Hitparade)	4
UK Albums (Official Charts)	1
US Billboard 200	1

Chart (2019)	Peak position
Polish Albums (ZPAV)	2

=== Year-end charts ===
2009 year-end chart performance for Crazy Love
Chart (2009)	Position
Australian Albums (ARIA)	6
Belgian Albums (Ultratop Flanders)	69
Canadian Albums (Billboard)	14
Irish Albums (IRMA)	2
Italian Albums (IRMA)	20
New Zealand Albums (RMNZ)	21
Swiss Albums (Schweizer Hitparade)	86
UK Albums (OCC)	3
US Billboard 200	48
US Jazz Albums (Billboard)	1

2010 year-end chart performance for Crazy Love
Chart (2010)	Position
Australian Albums (ARIA)	9
Belgian Albums (Ultratop Flanders)	27
Belgian Albums (Ultratop Wallonia)	17
Canadian Albums (Billboard)	4
Dutch Albums (Album Top 100)	8
European Top 100 Albums	3
German Albums (Offizielle Top 100)	83
Irish Albums (IRMA)	4
Italian Albums (IRMA)	23
New Zealand Albums (RMNZ)	33
Swiss Albums (Schweizer Hitparade)	56
UK Albums (OCC)	2
US Billboard 200	15
US Jazz Albums (Billboard)	1

2011 year-end chart performance for Crazy Love
Chart (2011)	Position
Australian Albums (ARIA)	29
Mexican Albums (Top 100 Mexico)	83
UK Albums (OCC)	20
US Billboard 200	183

2019 year-end chart performance for Crazy Love
Chart (2019)	Position
Polish Albums (ZPAV)	46

=== Decade-end charts ===
Chart (2010–2019)	Position
Australian Albums (ARIA)	56
UK Albums (OCC)	12
US Billboard 200	193

== Certifications and sales ==
Region	Certification	Certified units/sales
Australia (ARIA)	5× Platinum	350,000^{^}
Belgium (BRMA)	Gold	15,000^{*}
Canada (Music Canada)	3× Platinum	240,000^{^}
Denmark (IFPI Danmark)	Platinum	30,000^{^}
France (SNEP)	2× Platinum	200,000^{*}
Germany (BVMI)	Platinum	200,000^{^}
Ireland (IRMA)	15× Platinum	225,000^{^}
Italy (FIMI)	3× Platinum	180,000^{*}
Mexico (AMPROFON)	Gold	30,000^{^}
Netherlands (NVPI)	Platinum	50,000^{^}
New Zealand (RMNZ)	2× Platinum	30,000^{^}
Poland (ZPAV)	2× Platinum	40,000^{*}
Portugal (AFP)	Platinum	20,000^{^}
Switzerland (IFPI Switzerland)	Gold	15,000^{^}
United Kingdom (BPI)	10× Platinum	3,130,000
United States (RIAA)	2× Platinum	2,000,000^{^}
Summaries
Europe (IFPI)	3× Platinum	3,000,000^{*}
^{*} Sales figures based on certification alone.^{^} Shipments figures based on certification alone.
