= To Be Loved =

- Standard edition cover. The deluxe edition features a red background, while the Australian Tour edition has a blue background.

Studio album by Michael Bublé
- Released: April 15, 2013
- Recorded: June 2012 – January 2013
- Genres: Vocal jazz; traditional pop; swing; power pop
- Length: 46:16
- Labels: 143; Reprise
- Producer: Bob Rock

Michael Bublé chronology
Christmas (2011)	To Be Loved (2013)	Nobody but Me (2016)

Singles from To Be Loved
- 1. "It's a Beautiful Day" Released: February 25, 2013; 2. "Close Your Eyes" Released: July 1, 2013; 3. "After All" Released: September 23, 2013; 4. "You Make Me Feel So Young" Released: December 2, 2013; 5. "To Love Somebody" Released: March 24, 2014

To Be Loved is the eighth studio album by Canadian singer Michael Bublé. The album was released on April 15, 2013, by 143 Records and Reprise Records. The album was preceded by the release of the lead single, "It's a Beautiful Day", released on February 25, 2013. Featuring four original songs and ten cover versions, it became Bublé's fourth consecutive album to reach number one on the U.S. Billboard 200.

== Background ==
To Be Loved was commissioned by Michael's record label after the success of his fifth studio album, and seasonal record, Christmas. The album was entirely produced by Bob Rock, and was recorded in Vancouver, British Columbia, Canada and Los Angeles. The album includes ten standards and four original songs all co-written by Bublé, three with longtime collaborators Bob Rock, Alan Chang and Amy Foster-Gillies. "After All", one of the four original tracks, was written by Bryan Adams, Alan Chang, Steven Sater and Jim Vallance, and co-performed with Bryan Adams. The album also features appearances from actress Reese Witherspoon on "Somethin' Stupid", Naturally 7 and The Puppini Sisters, and includes covers of songs such as the Bee Gees' "To Love Somebody", Dean Martin's "Nevertheless (I'm in Love with You)", the Miracles' "Who's Lovin' You", Jackie Wilson's "To Be Loved", and Scotty Wiseman's "Have I Told You Lately That I Love You?"

In an interview posted on his official website, Bublé stated: "My new record is about love, happiness, fun and yummy things. Getting to work with my friend and longtime collaborator Bob Rock, who was also responsible for "Call Me Irresponsible", "Crazy Love" and "Christmas", and produced the entire album, was very exciting. We're a good team. I love the songs we selected this time out. It was also terrific working once again with my songwriting partners". Bublé was scheduled to perform ten dates at London's O2 Arena from June 30, 2013, in promotion of the album.

== Singles ==
"It's a Beautiful Day"
A sample of "It's a Beautiful Day" by Michael Bublé, serviced as the lead single from To Be Loved.

- "It's a Beautiful Day" was released as the album's lead single on February 25, 2013. Short audio clips of the track were posted to Bublé's official YouTube account, before the full track was released via iTunes. A music video for the track premiered February 28, 2013.
- "Close Your Eyes" was released as the album's second single on July 1, 2013. The music video premiered on July 8, as a tribute to Bublé's wife. The video features Bublé performing the track in the studio.
- "After All" was released as the album's third single on September 23, 2013. The single was announced on August 17, 2013, with the music video due to premier the first week in September.
- "You Make Me Feel So Young" was released as the album's fourth single on December 2, 2013. The single was only released as a promotional single for UK radio, with a music video filmed live at London's Air Studios was released on November 7, 2013. A second music video, with Bublé walking in an animated world was released on December 3, 2013.
- "To Love Somebody" was released as the album's fifth single in March 2014. The single was only released as a promotional single for UK and European radio stations. A music video was released on February 5, 2014.
- "You've Got a Friend in Me" became a U.S. Adult Contemporary chart hit, spending 14 weeks on the chart and peaking at number 10.

== Commercial performance ==
To Be Loved debuted at No. 1 on the Billboard 200, selling 197,000 copies in the first week in the United States. As of September 20, 2016, the album has sold 881,000 copies in the United States. In the United Kingdom, To Be Loved had sold 631,224 copies as of December 2013, thus becoming the third best-selling album of the year. As of October 2016, the album had sold 784,420 copies in the UK. In Canada it sold 139,000 copies in 2013.

== Critical reception ==
Professional ratings
Review scores
Source	Rating
AllMusic	4/5 stars
The Canberra Times	5/5 stars
Idolator	3.5/5 stars
The Oakland Press	2.5/4 stars
The Scotsman	4/5 stars
Shields Gazette	5/10
Toronto Star	2/4 stars
USA Today	3/4 stars
The Vancouver Sun	3/5 stars
Virgin Media	3/5 stars

To Be Loved received mostly positive reviews from music critics. AllMusic's Matt Collar found that the album "isn't just a perfect showcase for Bublé's voice, it's also one of his most diverse and enjoyable albums." At The Canberra Times, James Baldwin told that Bublé "has a lot to deliver to keep both fans and critics impressed", which he noted that "Michael's voice seems to be getting better and better with each release", and called the release "perfect." Colin Stutz of Idolator said that "his performance is ever strong and mature" because "Buble uses that power to carry the album poignantly, be it songs he wrote or those by others." At The Oakland Press, Gary Graff stated that this effort is "indeed a buoyant affair, marked by love songs sung in his distinctive manner, something altogether different from the classical bombast of a Josh Groban or the crooner stylings of Bublé’s big band-fronting forebears." The Scotsman alluded to how "Buble's slick vocals cannot be faulted throughout". Elysa Gardner of USA Today evoked how "Bublé sounds like a man in love on this new collection of pop and soul standards and original tunes", and that allows "his clear, limpid voice is as technically supple as ever, and there's more genuine verve (and grit) in his delivery."

Peter Goddard of the Toronto Star wrote that the album is "Sure not about making any musical breakthrough[s]". AW for the Shields Gazette called the " music formulated for minimal offence, watered down with minimal risk, and, as such, failing to provoke any form of emotion", which is the "embodiment of the colour beige; painfully safe, somewhat dull and seemingly dreamt up as an ideal kitchen decoration." At The Vancouver Sun, Francois Marchand called the album "exactly what it should be: A middle-of-the-road jazz-pop crooner record that sparkles in your ears like a million little fizzy sugar-pop bubbles and is just cookie-cutter enough to please the masses." Virgin Media's Matthew Horton told that "the majority of To Be Loved boils down to straight retreads of admittedly great songs", and "that's just the way it goes. You don't come to Bublé for post-dubstep glitch experiments. You come for the polar opposite, delivered with style."

== Tour ==
The To Be Loved Tour began on June 30, 2013, in London.

=== Set list ===
Orchestral Introduction
"Fever"
"Haven't Met You Yet"
"Try a Little Tenderness"
"You Make Me Feel So Young"
"Moondance"
"Come Dance with Me"
"Feeling Good"
"Instrumental (Team Buble)"
"I've Got the World on a String"
"Everything"
"That's All"
"Close Your Eyes"
"How Can You Mend a Broken Heart"
"Home"
"Get Lucky"
"Who's Loving You"
"I Want You Back"
"To Love Somebody"
"All You Need Is Love"
"Burning Love"
"It's a Beautiful Day"

Encore

"Cry Me a River"
"After All" (With special guest Bryan Adams on July 7)
"A Song for You"

== Track listing ==
No.	Title	Writer(s)	Length
1.	"You Make Me Feel So Young"	Mack Gordon; Josef Myrow	3:06
2.	"It's a Beautiful Day"	Michael Bublé; Amy Foster; Alan Chang	3:19
3.	"To Love Somebody"	Barry Gibb; Robin Gibb	3:15
4.	"Who's Lovin' You"	William "Smokey" Robinson	2:56
5.	"Somethin' Stupid" (featuring Reese Witherspoon)	Clarence Carson Parks	2:58
6.	"Come Dance with Me"	Jimmy Van Heusen; Sammy Cahn	2:46
7.	"Close Your Eyes"	Bublé; Chang; Jann Arden Richards	3:33
8.	"After All" (featuring Bryan Adams)	Bublé; Chang; Bryan Adams; Steven Sater; Jim Vallance	3:38
9.	"Have I Told You Lately That I Love You?" (with Naturally 7)	Scotty Wiseman	3:26
10.	"To Be Loved"	Berry Gordy Jr.; Gwendolyn Gordy Fuqua; Tyran Carlo	3:41
11.	"You've Got a Friend in Me"	Randy Newman	3:26
12.	"Nevertheless (I'm in Love with You)" (featuring The Puppini Sisters)	Bert Kalmar; Harry Ruby	2:56
13.	"I Got It Easy"	Bublé; Tom Jackson; Chang	3:39
14.	"Young at Heart"	Johnny Richards; Carolyn Leigh	3:43
Total length:			46:16

Deluxe edition bonus tracks
No.	Title	Writer(s)	Length
15.	"Be My Baby"	Phil Spector; Jeff Barry; Ellie Greenwich	2:48
16.	"It's a Beautiful Day" (swing mix)	Bublé; Rock; Chang	4:17
17.	"My Melancholy Baby"	Ernie Burnett; George A. Norton	3:29
Total length:			56:58

2014 re-release deluxe edition bonus tracks
No.	Title	Writer(s)	Length
15.	"Be My Baby"	Spector; Barry; Greenwich	2:48
16.	"It's a Beautiful Day" (swing mix)	Bublé; Rock; Chang	4:17
17.	"The Making of To Be Loved" (video)		31:20

== Charts ==
=== Weekly charts ===
Chart (2013–17)	Peak position
Argentinian Albums Chart	1
Australian Albums (ARIA)	1
Austrian Albums (Ö3 Austria)	1
Belgian Albums (Ultratop Flanders)	1
Belgian Albums (Ultratop Wallonia)	4
Canadian Albums (Billboard)	1
Chilean Albums	1
Danish Albums (Hitlisten)	2
Dutch Albums (Album Top 100)	1
Finnish Albums (Suomen virallinen lista)	2
French Albums (SNEP)	4
German Albums (Offizielle Top 100)	2
Hong Kong Albums (HMV Overall Charts)	1
Hungarian Albums (MAHASZ)	1
Irish Albums (IRMA)	1
Italian Albums (FIMI)	3
Mexican Albums Chart	1
New Zealand Albums (RMNZ)	1
Norwegian Albums (VG-lista)	2
Polish Albums (ZPAV)	1
Portuguese Albums (AFP)	1
Scottish Albums (Official Charts)	1
South African Albums (RISA)	2
Spanish Albums (Promusicae)	4
Swedish Albums (Sverigetopplistan)	3
Swiss Albums (Schweizer Hitparade)	1
Taiwanese International Albums Chart	16
UK Albums (OCC)	1
US Billboard 200	1
US Top Jazz Albums (Billboard)	1

=== Year-end charts ===
Chart (2013)	Position
Argentine Albums (CAPIF)	30
Australian Albums (ARIA)	4
Austrian Albums (Ö3 Austria)	26
Belgian Albums (Ultratop Flanders)	45
Belgian Albums (Ultratop Wallonia)	62
Canadian Albums (Billboard)	14
Danish Albums (Hitlisten)	53
Dutch Albums (Album Top 100)	13
Finnish Albums (Suomen virallinen lista)	5
French Albums (SNEP)	141
German Albums (Offizielle Top 100)	63
Hungarian Albums (MAHASZ)	22
Irish Albums (IRMA)	7
Mexican Albums (AMPROFON)	32
New Zealand Albums (RMNZ)	11
Spanish Albums (PROMUSICAE)	30
Swiss Albums (Schweizer Hitparade)	43
UK Albums (OCC)	3
US Billboard 200	28
US Top Jazz Albums (Billboard)	1

Chart (2014)	Position
Australian Albums (ARIA)	40
Belgian Albums (Ultratop Flanders)	169
New Zealand Albums (RMNZ)	14
UK Albums (OCC)	56
US Top Jazz Albums (Billboard)	2

=== Decade-end charts ===
Chart (2010–2019)	Position
Australian Albums (ARIA)	71
UK Albums (OCC)	74
US Billboard 200	179

== Certifications and sales ==
Region	Certification	Certified units/sales
Australia (ARIA)	2× Platinum	140,000^{^}
Austria (IFPI Austria)	Platinum	15,000^{*}
Brazil (Pro-Música Brasil)	Gold	20,000^{*}
Canada (Music Canada)	4× Platinum	320,000^{^}
Denmark (IFPI Danmark)	Gold	10,000^{‡}
France (SNEP)	Gold	50,000^{*}
Finland	—	8,814
Germany (BVMI)	3× Gold	300,000^{‡}
Hungary (MAHASZ)	Platinum	2,000^{^}
Ireland (IRMA)	2× Platinum	30,000^{^}
Italy (FIMI)	Gold	30,000^{*}
Mexico (AMPROFON)	Gold	30,000^{^}
New Zealand (RMNZ)	Platinum	15,000^{^}
Poland (ZPAV)	Gold	10,000^{‡}
Spain (Promusicae)	Gold	20,000^{^}
Switzerland (IFPI Switzerland)	Gold	10,000^{^}
United Kingdom (BPI)	2× Platinum	784,420
United States (RIAA)	Platinum	1,000,000^{‡}
Summaries
Europe (IFPI)	Platinum	1,000,000^{*}
Worldwide 2013 sales	—	2,400,000
^{*} Sales figures based on certification alone.^{^} Shipments figures based on certification alone.^{‡} Sales+streaming figures based on certification alone.
