= Hollywood (Michael Bublé song) =

2010 single by Michael Bublé

Single by Michael Bublé

from the album Crazy Love: The Hollywood Edition
- B-side: "Mack the Knife"
- Released: September 7, 2010
- Recorded: 2010
- Genre: Power pop; pop rock
- Length: 4:13 (album version); 3:35 (radio edit)
- Label: 143 Records; Reprise
- Songwriters: Michael Bublé; Robert G. Scott
- Producer: Bob Rock

Michael Bublé singles chronology
"Crazy Love" (2010)	"Hollywood" (2010)	"All I Want for Christmas Is You" (2011)

Music video
- Hollywood on YouTube

"Hollywood", originally titled "Hollywood Is Dead", is a song by Canadian artist Michael Bublé, released as the fifth and final single from his fourth studio album Crazy Love, and is the only from its re-release, The Hollywood Edition, which was released on October 25, 2010. "Hollywood" was released worldwide on September 7, 2010.

== Background ==
Bublé described the song as being about his "tongue-in-cheek statement on the culture of celebrity," saying "People will do anything for their 15 minutes, and you have to remember who you are and why you wanted it. At the end of the day, you should be careful: You might get what you wish for." "Hollywood" was originally planned to be Crazy Love's third single and was reported to be released as a stand-alone single at a later date because the song did not fit the album thematically or stylistically. It debuted on the Billboard Hot 100 at the fifty-fifth position, with 46,000 digital downloads in its first week. He performed "Hollywood" on The X Factor on October 31, 2010. He also performed the song on The Today Show on November 28 and The Tonight Show with Jay Leno on December 12.

== Composition ==
The song is based on a beat-like groove, unlike Bublé's many other uptempo singles, which feature a swing feel, such as "Haven't Met You Yet", "It's a Beautiful Day" and "Feeling Good".

It contains at least two references to songs by The Beatles. First, the melody of the first two lines of the verse is nearly identical to the song "Do You Want To Know A Secret?". Second, the first line of the fourth verse mentions a tango, and the groove of the song changes slightly, differentiating this verse from the first three - exactly the same happens in Chuck Berry's song "Rock and Roll Music", and its cover version by the Beatles.

== Music video ==
The music video was released on September 27, 2010 and was directed by Rich Lee. It features Bublé walking through Hollywood and watching himself parodying several different characters and celebrities, such as an astronaut, James Dean driving his Porsche 550 Spyder numbered 130, a Starsky and Hutch-esque character in a police chase driving a GTO Judge muscle car, Clint Eastwood as a cowboy in The Good, the Bad and the Ugly, and Justin Bieber, which Bublé described on his website as "a loving tribute" to the fellow Canadian singer. The official lyric video was released on September 10. UsMagazine.com premiered the exclusive backstage filming of the music video on October 5.

== Track listing ==
- UK CD single
1. "Hollywood" - 4:13
2. "Mack the Knife" - 3:20

== Charts ==
=== Weekly charts ===
Chart (2010–11)	Peak position
Austria	91
Canada Hot 100 (Billboard)	17
Hungary (Rádiós Top 40)	13
Ireland (IRMA)	2
Netherlands (Dutch Top 40 Tipparade)	2
Scotland Singles (OCC)	10
UK Singles (OCC)	11
US Billboard Hot 100	55
US Adult Contemporary (Billboard)	6

=== Year-end charts ===
Chart (2010)	Position
Italy Airplay (EarOne)	47
UK Singles Chart	143
US Adult Contemporary	26
Chart (2011)	Position
US Adult Contemporary	21

== Cover versions ==
John Barrowman covered the song on the album You Raise Me Up in 2014.
