= The Actual Tigers =

Actual Tigers (Willis)
- Origin: Seattle, United States
- Genres: Alternative rock Folk rock
- Years active: 1994–2002
- Labels: Capitol Records; Collective Fruit; Nettwerk America

The Actual Tigers, originally known as Willis, were an American rock band formed in 1994 in Seattle. They released two full studio albums on CD: a self-titled debut and Gravelled and Green, produced with Dennis Herring. The band opened for Counting Crows after their second studio CD was released and, in 2005 after the Actual Tigers had disbanded, Gravelled and Green was ranked by MSNBC as one of the top 20 albums of the past 20 years. The band played together for seven years, having a sound often compared to Paul Simon and early Wilco.

== Beginning ==
=== Early days and self-releases ===
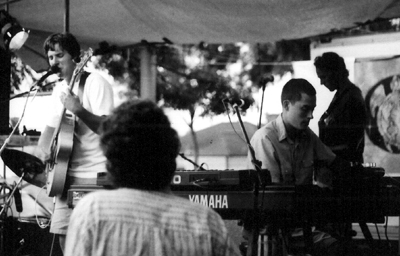
Willis, later the Actual Tigers, at the Fiddler's Inn, summer 1998

Willis formed after Tim Seely (vocals, guitar), Max Perry, (bass, background vocals), John Low (keyboard) and Diarmuid Cullen (drums) met one New Year's Eve. Each had been in other, less-successful high school bands and named their group in part after the older brother character on the long-running TV show Diff'rent Strokes. "We started out parodying music ... from there, we came up with our own sound," Low said in 1996. "Diarmuid is the only trained musician in the group. The rest of us taught ourselves how to play. That leads to our original sound." The band's first song was Freakynuts, about a man whose hair was growing the opposite way.

In March 1994, Willis debuted that song, dedicated to the Chuba Chuba Posse, at an assembly following the conclusion of Tradition Week, an annual event at Bishop Blanchet High School. "The crowd was really responsive," Seely said in Dec. 1997. "They were gettin' a little too rowdy and they had to pull the plug on us two or three times because everyone was gettin' a little excited. It was a good welcome from the crowd."

The band later got a break at Seattle's Owl and Thistle Irish Pub despite being younger than the Washington State drinking age, and in Sept. 1996 released a 12-song self-released CD, which was mostly recorded in Tacoma.

During shows in 1996, including a May 13, 1996 show at the Colorbox in Seattle, members of Willis wore suits to stand out from other bands. It was also that year when their sound began being described in news articles as "rootsy pop.” Willis shows included: Nov. 24, 1996 at the Owl and Thistle; Nov. 29, 1996 at the Sit and Spin; April 4, 1997 at The Backstage in Ballard; July 26, 1997 at Club Nights at the Pier and Aug. 15, 1997 at the Showbox at the Market. Other early venues were Gibson's Bar and Grill, Dutch Ned's Saloon, Doc Maynards, the Tractor Tavern, Bellingham's KISM’s Locals Only radio program, the Crystal Ballroom (Portland, Oregon) and Magnuson Park in Seattle.

Perry, who was a year behind the others at Blanchet, wasn't able to legally hang around before and after the band's bar performances until an Aug. 28, 1999 show at The Crocodile Café. He turned 21 that week.

=== Seattle radio success ===
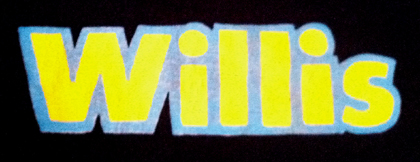
Photo of the Willis logo on a band T-shirt

John Fisher, a disc jockey on KMTT in Seattle, had seen the band before their debut CD was complete and put "Reason For a Rake" in the stations regular rotation after receiving the completed track in 1996. Seely wrote what became the song's lyrics as part of a University of Washington poetry class.

By fall 1997, the song had reached No. 5 on the KMTT listeners' request list. "We get a lot of calls from people (who) have just heard us talking about them and have wanted to hear more," Fisher said that September. Also in 1997, KNDD disc jockey Marco Collins played "End of May" on his show. Collins, who helped launch Beck to national prominence, liked both Willis and the effect of a clock ticking in the background of the song, the sole rhythmic element in the original recording.

In summer 1997, Willis took second place in a Late Night with Conan O'Brien college band search. The prize was a form letter and four sweatshirts, sizes small and medium. Manager Brad Hole sent a request to perform on the Late Show with David Letterman, which was denied, but the band received T-shirts in adult sizes as a consolation. In Aug. 1998, Willis played Fiddlestock III at the Fiddler's Inn in Wedgwood, a North Seattle neighborhood. Their set, which began with then-unreleased “Testimony,” included a cover of N.W.A.'s "Straight Outta Compton."

== National exposure ==
=== Capitol Records contract ===
The band signed a six-record deal with Capitol Records in 1997. "We decided on Dennis Herring because we have a good chemistry with this guy and we thought he worked well with the band," Seely said in Dec. 1997. Herring also has been a producer for Counting Crows, Elvis Costello, Modest Mouse, and Ben Folds.

Willis was featured on the soundtrack to Never Been Kissed, a 1999 film starring Drew Barrymore. Their song “Standing By,” written years earlier but previously unreleased, was the second of 16 tracks on the soundtrack released April 9, 1999. The album also featured songs from R.E.M., Jimmy Eat World, The Beach Boys and The Smiths. On Sept. 3, 1999, the band had their second Bumbershoot performance (the first was 1997), and on May 20 that year Seely played a solo show at the Tractor Tavern.

Willis followed in 2000 with a five-song EP, Bourgeois Blues. Three of the songs, “Bourgeois Blues,” “Bad Day” and “Testimony,” would be released on Gravelled and Green. The other two, “Truckers' Lullaby” and “Sunshot Vistas,” were acoustic and only released by the band on the EP. The disc was released on the Collective Fruit label.

Legal concerns were among reasons Willis changed its name in summer 2001. The previous year, the band met Silver Jews frontman David Berman at a San Francisco poetry showcase and, during their conversation, explained the name problem. He later sent a postcard that would inspire their new name, the Actual Tigers.

Willis' final performance was at 8 p.m. June 8, 2001, at the Experience Music Project's Sky Church. The second set was billed as the Actual Tigers; the first set was Willis and concluded with “Broccoli McGee.” Cullen, an Ireland native, played the last notes on an Irish tin whistle. Gravelled and Green was recorded at the time, but wasn't released until July 17, 2001 on Nettwerk America, Sarah McLachlan's record label. The band followed with a July 20 show at The Showbox across from the Pike Place Market in Seattle.

=== Gravelled and Green ===
On Gravelled and Green Seely had vocals, guitar, ukulele, vibraphone, tambourine, hand claps, music box and tapes. Perry played bass and sang background vocals. Low played accordion, piano, Fender Rhodes piano, organ, Wurlitzer organ, Mellotron, synthesizer, hand claps, sampler and background vocals. When Gravelled and Green was released, the Actual Tigers were Perry, Seely and Low, though the album had Cullen playing guitar drums and percussion. Eric Gardner, a Los Angeles-based drummer, replaced Cullen, who had previously studied at Seattle's Cornish College of the Arts and left the band to study jazz.

Joe Hancock played French horn; Jeff Callaway played trombone; and Jared Bacon played tuba on album's final track, “The One That Got Away.” Gravelled and Green was produced by The Actual Tigers and Herring, who also sang some background vocals. Engineers included Richard Hasal, Mark Howard and Joe Chiccarelli. Audio mixers were Chris Lord-Alge, Mark Howard and Hasal. Gravelled and Green was recorded at seven studios: Ardent in Memphis, Tenn.; Iltho in Seattle, Wash., Image, in Los Angeles; Ironwood in Seattle; Mad Hatter in Los Angeles; Sweet Tea in Oxford, Miss.; and Teatro in Oxnard, Cali. Photography was done by John Clark.

In 2001, the Actual Tigers opened for Counting Crows. Joe Seely, Tim's brother who later formed the folk rock duo Pillowfighter with Margaret White, joined.

== Solo projects and ‘’End of May’’ ==
In Aug. 1999, Seely said he thought Capitol "just wanted us to be a straightforward pop band," and the label's original plan was to have Willis re-record their self-titled, self-produced album. "We spent a lot of time trying to make the old songs sound new," he said. "Hearing those old songs, a lot of them I wrote before I was 18 - I compare it to getting tattoos when you're young, and then as you get older you realize they suck."

The band later convinced Capitol to scrap that idea and let them record new material, which Seely described as having a fuller sound with more strings and horns.

The Actual Tigers "basically ended because there was some extreme frustration involved throughout the process of us being signed with Capitol Records, and then it was farmed out to another label called Nettwerk," Seely said in 2005. "Capitol was supposed to help out with that and they kind of dropped the ball, and we were at the point in our lives where some guys wanted to do things that actually made money besides music. So I decided to keep churning out the hits. And that's what is embodied on Funeral Music."

=== Tim Seely’s Funeral Music ===
Seely recorded several of the Funeral Music tracks at Herring's Sweet Tea studio in Oxford, Miss., taking up his offer to produce the record even though Seely didn't have a record deal during the recording. Musician/engineer Clay Jones also worked on the record. "It was good to start the process with them because I think it was more of a true collaboration," Seely said in 2006. "I brought it home back to Seattle and recorded - I think it was four tracks that I did all the instrumentation on myself in my home studio." Seely's studio work in Oxford ended when Modest Mouse came to record Good News for People Who Love Bad News, which included "Float On", a song nominated for a 2005 Grammy Award.

Seely, who also learned techniques of how to record at Herring's studio, used the tracks recorded in Oxford as a template. Funeral Music was released July 19, 2005, and received praise from David Dye of National Public Radio's World Café and from Doug Miller of MSNBC.

=== “End of May” ===
In Nov. 2001, “End of May” was included during a breakup scene on the TV show Felicity. During a tour that year, musician Alan Chang became a fan after opening during a California show. Chang later played piano for Canadian singer Michael Bublé, and played for him the Wills song written by Seely when Bublé was recovering from a breakup with actress Emily Blunt.

Bublé recorded the song in 2009 for release on Crazy Love, but it was not part of the album. Bublé told the Seattle Weekly, where Seely's older brother Mike is editor-in-chief, that “it's one of the most beautiful fuckin' songs ever,” and not putting it on the record was one of his toughest decisions. Bublé elaborated that he wouldn't let it be a bonus track, saying “it's honestly the best vocal performance I've ever given.”

In Oct. 2010, “End of May” was included on Hollywood the Deluxe EP, which was included as a bonus disc on ‘’Crazy Love (Hollywood Edition) ’’. It also was selected by fans in an online poll as the song they most wanted to hear streamed on Bublé's webpage.

=== Max Perry ===
Perry has played several shows in Seattle during 2011, often accompanied by painting from Andrew Miller of Mantisart. On May 5, Perry played the J&M in Seattle's Pioneer Square and on June 23, he played the Tiger Lounge in Seattle’s Georgetown neighborhood while Miller and others painted. In May 2011, Perry released a work-in-progress version of “Said She'll Wait,” recorded and mixed by Yevgeniy Frid at Heavy Genius Studios in Ballard.

Other original songs by Perry include “Don't Worry” and “Still the Same.”

=== Diarmuid Cullen ===
Cullen became a minority owner and the bar manager at Conor Byrne in Ballard and played with Mooncalf, which recorded and produced their 2005 self-titled release in various bedrooms, bathrooms and bars throughout Ballard, Wash., between 2003 and 2005. The album gained regular airplay on Seattle's KEXP-FM in 2005. Cullen, Mooncalf bassist Matt Millet and Jason Rowe, who did sound for Willis and the Actual Tigers, also played with Seely as the Army of Tim. In summer 2008, Cullen, Millet and laptop instrumentalist Pat Wellnitz (aka C.J. Sob) of Mooncalf assumed full proprietorship of Conor Byrne while working on another album Allerjesus.

For Seely's song “On Film I Play Myself,” which featured Cullen on drums, Miller filed a Super 8 video that was produced by Jason Reid of 2R Productions. Reid also produced the video for Seely's Funeral Music version of “Trucker's Lullaby” and in 2006 directed a video for Mooncalf. Reid is known for his award-winning documentary Sonicsgate, released in Oct. 2009, on which Low composed original music.

=== John Low ===
Low attended Berklee College of Music and in 2004 became owner of Little Gettysburg Music, a company that provides music services for television spots, trailers, corporate promos and documentary films. In addition to Sonicsgate, Low has composed for the television documentary series' Frontline and The American Experience. Based in Los Angeles, he's also worked on trailers for Pirate Radio, Fish Tank, and the 2008 film about Harvey Milk.

Also, in 2011 a Facebook group page was started: I Think At Least 500 People Would Like To See A Willis Reunion. As of that July, nearly 200 people had joined.

== Discography ==
Willis (cassette)

1. "Huck"
2. "Lounge"
3. "Freakynuts"
4. "Bunny Maker"
5. "January 36th"
6. "Tupperware Shoes"
7. "The Gooch"

Willis (CD) (Sept. 1996)

1. "Reason for a Rake"
2. "Tupperware Shoes"
3. "Freeway"
4. "Halfway House"
5. "January 36th"
6. "Broccoli McGee"
7. "Bunny Maker"
8. "Lounge"
9. "Felix the Waterboy”
10. "New Melody"
11. "Freakynuts"
12. "End of May"

Bourgeois Blues (2000)

1. "Bourgeois Blues"
2. "Bad Day"
3. "Truckers’ Lullaby"
4. "Testimony"
5. "Sunshot Vistas"

Gravelled and Green (July 2001)

1. "Yardwork in November"
2. "Standing By"
3. "Time and Space"
4. "Bad Day"
5. "Halfway House"
6. "Interlude"
7. "Bourgeois Blues"
8. "Testimony"
9. "End of May"
10. "On a Roll"
11. "Shades of Brown"
12. "The One That Got Away "
