= Amy S. Foster =

Canadian songwriter and author

Amy Skylark Foster (born July 29, 1973) is a Canadian songwriter and author. She is the daughter of record producer and songwriter David Foster and Bonnie Jean "B.J." Cook.

== Career ==
The Nashville Scene described Foster as a "successful songwriter" whose songs had "hit the No. 1 slot" 3 times by 2009.

Best known for her collaborations with Michael Bublé, Foster has co-written "Home", "Everything", "Hold On", "Haven't Met You Yet", "To Be Loved", and "Beautiful Day". Her songs have been recorded by Blake Shelton, Destiny's Child, Josh Groban, and Andrea Bocelli.

Foster has stated that when Bublé sent her an early draft of "Home" her first thoughts were, "Oh, great, complain about being stuck in Europe," nevertheless, she related to the idea of missing someone, and agreed to help write the song.

Her first book, When Autumn Leaves, was published in 2009. Booklist wrote that, "the romantic, mystical setting and appealing characters will delight readers searching for a modern-day fairy tale."

== Personal life ==
Foster was previously married to Simon Gillies. They have two daughters, Mikaela and Eva. In 2012, she married Matthew Freeman. They have a son, Vaughn.
