= Haven't Met You Yet =

2009 single by Michael Bublé

Single by Michael Bublé

from the album Crazy Love
- B-side: "Crazy Little Thing Called Love"
- Released: August 31, 2009
- Recorded: 2009
- Genre: Sunshine pop; swing
- Length: 4:05
- Label: 143; Reprise
- Songwriters: Michael Bublé; Alan Chang; Amy Foster-Gillies
- Producers: Bob Rock; Martin Asp

Michael Bublé singles chronology
"Comin' Home Baby" (2008)	"Haven't Met You Yet" (2009)	"Hold On" (2010)

Music video
- "Michael Bublé - Haven't Met You Yet [Official Music Video]" on YouTube

"Haven't Met You Yet" is the first single from Canadian singer Michael Bublé's fourth studio album, Crazy Love, released on August 31, 2009. According to Bublé, the single and its official music video are "about everyone's dream of finding a relationship and love." Bublé co-wrote "Haven't Met You Yet" with Alan Chang and Amy Foster-Gillies, and dedicated it to his wife, Luisana Lopilato (who appears as his love interest in the music video).

The song has proven successful on the adult contemporary charts, reaching number one in the U.S. on the chart week of January 30, 2010 and becoming the first song in history to debut at number one on Billboard Canada's AC chart. It is Bublé's third #1 single on the adult contemporary charts after "Home" and "Everything". It was also a big success on the Billboard Hot 100, where the song reached #24, being his highest charting single on the chart. The song entered the United Kingdom Singles Chart on the October 18, 2009 at number 9, making it his first top 10 hit in the UK, eventually climbing up to number 5 in its third week. The song won Single of the Year at the 2010 Juno Awards and was nominated for Best Male Pop Vocal Performance at the 53rd Grammy Awards.

== Background ==
Bublé wrote the song while he was dating his wife Luisana Lopilato. A clip of the song was released on The Daily Bublé on his website. The full song was available for streaming only on his official fan club, Bungalow-B, on August 28, 2009. It was later available on iTunes on August 30 and then on his official page on August 31.

== Critical reception ==
The song received favourable reviews. Patrick McKiernan from the website Allgigs.co.uk gave the song 4 out of 5 stars, saying, "The lyrical structure is not too far from his comfort zone but is still engaging enough to pay attention to but it's actually the music I think is great. The piano is jaunty and upbeat and has some very beautiful, understated string arrangement that matches his vocal charm perfectly and the song even has a great bit of bugle at the bridge." The song was one of the album's track pick from the AllMusic review. Nick Levine from Digital Spy gave the song 3 out of 5 stars, saying: "'Haven't Met You Yet' is a toe-tapping pop tune with lavish production—the strings swell in all the right places, the brass parps perkily—and lyrics so shamelessly romantic Barry Manilow could sing them. It's cheesy as a quesadilla and too chirpy by half, but if this sort of thing pushes your guilty pleasure button, it's probably best to enjoy it while you can".

== Music video ==
A promotional video was released a few days after the release of the song in digital format at his official site on September 5, 2009. It showed Bublé at a photo shoot wearing a dark brown jacket against a white background. The video revolves around him in the photo shoot session.

The full music video was directed by Rich Lee and was released on October 1, 2009. According to Bublé's 2011 official memoir Onstage Offstage, the "Haven't Met You Yet" music video was inspired by the Offspring's 1999 music video "Why Don't You Get a Job?" and the 1986 film Ferris Bueller's Day Off. Bublé credited the Offspring's video as the "launch point" for his music video, in which the idea of a singer is followed by a marching band. The choreography in Bublé's music video is the same choreography from the 1986 film. Kenny Ortega, the choreographer for Ferris Bueller's Day Off, was contacted for permission to use the "Twist and Shout" dance choreography from the film's parade scene. The video was filmed over two days at a supermarket.

The video is about Bublé in a supermarket (Killarney Market on 49th Avenue in Vancouver, Canada, in the Killarney neighbourhood). After meeting a blonde woman (Luisana Lopilato) in an aisle, all the customers, staff, and a cameo appearance by the West Vancouver Youth Band, start dancing around the store in celebration, eventually moving outside to the parking lot as confetti descends. The video then cuts to Bublé at the cash register with the cashier handing him his receipt while he is still seemingly lost in daydreams. An embarrassed Bublé then takes the receipt and walks out with everyone staring at him. As he is about to exit the supermarket, he sees the blonde woman from his daydream walking into the supermarket. He glances at her and walks out of the supermarket perplexed. After filming the video Bublé and Lopilato became engaged and were married on March 31, 2011, in Argentina.

The sequel for the "Haven't Met You Yet" music video is continued in Bublé's 2022 music video "I'll Never Not Love You", featuring his pregnant wife Luisiana Lopilato and their three children who appear at a supermarket. Bublé stated on his official Twitter, " 'Haven't Met You Yet' was the beautiful start of a true romance. 10 years later, the story continues in the extraordinary sequel 'I'll Never Not Love You' 2.22.22".

== Composition ==
The song begins in C♯/D♭ Major, and at the 2:15 mark, the key changes to D♯/E♭ Major throughout the rest of the song.

== Track listing ==
- Digital download
1. "Haven't Met You Yet" - 4:05
2. "Everything" (Live from Madison Square Garden) - 3:37
3. "Crazy Little Thing Called Love" (Live from Madison Square Garden) - 4:33
- Digital download EP
1. "Haven't Met You Yet" (Donni Hotwheel Radio Edit) - 3:08
2. "Haven't Met You Yet" (Donni Hotwheel Extended Mix) - 4:35
3. "Haven't Met You Yet" (Jason Nevins Radio Edit) - 3:36
4. "Haven't Met You Yet" (Jason Nevins Club Mix) - 6:23
5. "Haven't Met You Yet" (Cutmore Club Mix) - 6:38
- German CD single
1. "Haven't Met You Yet" - 4:05
2. "Crazy Little Thing Called Love" (Live from Madison Square Garden) - 4:33

== In popular culture ==
External videos
- Video of Jon Hamm and Michael Bublé in the Saturday Night Live restaurant sketch, "Hamm & Bublé". at Hulu.com
- "Russian Unicorn" — the video from Bad Lip Reading, which Michael claimed was "one of the coolest things he's ever seen" at YouTube.com

During the January 30, 2010 episode of Saturday Night Live, in which Bublé is the musical guest, he appeared in a commercial parody for a restaurant that host Jon Hamm has opened called "Hamm and Bublé" that exclusively serves dishes featuring pork (ham) and champagne (bubbly - a deliberate mispronunciation of Bublé). While Bublé sings alternate lyrics to the melody of "Haven't Met You Yet" that reflects the restaurant's theme, it becomes obvious that Hamm is holding Bublé against his will, forcing him to sing and perform non-musical shows.

The song was performed as a group by the cast of American Idol during the March 12 results show of the ninth season.

In September 2010 nearly a thousand students from the University of Victoria, Canada shot a lip dub featuring "Haven't Met You Yet". The lip dub was mentioned on CBC News: The National and covered extensively from local news outlets. On October 27, Michael Bublé posted a link of the "impressive" video to his Facebook page. The video reached over 100,000 views on YouTube in less than a week after being released online on October 22. The lip dub was made in response to the viral 'UVic' (Universitat de Vic from Spain) "Hey, Soul Sister" lip dub that many, including celebrity blogger Perez Hilton, mistakenly believed came from the Canadian 'UVic'. Michael Bublé expressed interest in being a part of the lip dub, but due to scheduling conflicts was unable to be in Victoria, British Columbia at the time of shooting.

On July 11, 2011, a YouTube channel called Bad Lip Reading did another type of lip dub-recording over the music video using an entirely new song, called "Russian Unicorn", unrelated musically to the original, with lyrics that matched Bublé's lip movements. For example, the new song changed the original line "We can work to work it out" to "We could shoot a Russian unicorn." Bublé mentioned it in an interview, saying it was his new favourite song. He said it was "one of the coolest things I've ever seen" and called the maker "an evil genius".

On October 24, 2016, Riley Elmore covered this song as the knockout on The Voice, Season 11.

On March 31, 2025, Barry Jean covered this song as the knockout on The Voice, Season 27.

== Chart performance ==
In its first week, "Haven't Met You Yet" debuted at number 65 with only digital downloads to promote it. Simultaneously, it debuted at number 33 on the Hot Digital Songs chart, number 22 on the Hot Adult Contemporary Tracks, and the top five in Canada. The week of January 30, 2010, the song reached number 40 (becoming his first Top 40 hit) after several months on the chart. It has become his highest-charting song yet ("Everything" reached number 46), reaching number 24 in its 34th week on the chart. It is also his best charting song in the Mainstream Top 40, where it peaked at number 21. It also became his third number-one on the Adult Contemporary charts. Meanwhile, on the UK Singles Chart, he scored his first top ten single after debuting at number nine. In its third week, it climbed to number five, making it his first top five hit and highest ever entry in the United Kingdom.

== Charts and certifications ==
=== Weekly charts ===
Weekly chart performance for "Haven't Met You Yet"
Chart (2009–2010)	Peak position
Australia (ARIA)	9
Austria (Ö3 Austria Top 40)	54
Belgium (Ultratop 50 Flanders)	42
Belgium (Ultratop 50 Wallonia)	12
Canada Hot 100 (Billboard)	5
Denmark (Tracklisten)	32
Europe (European Hot 100)	12
France (SNEP)	14
Germany (GfK)	53
Hungary (Editors' Choice Top 40)	33
Ireland (IRMA)	5
Italy (FIMI)	7
Netherlands (Dutch Top 40)	4
Netherlands (Single Top 100)	16
Portugal Digital Song Sales (Billboard)	9
Sweden (Sverigetopplistan)	39
Switzerland (Schweizer Hitparade)	37
UK Singles (Official Charts)	5
US Billboard Hot 100	24
US Adult Contemporary (Billboard)	1
US Adult Pop Airplay (Billboard)	8
US Pop Airplay (Billboard)	21
US Smooth Jazz Airplay (Billboard)	12

=== Year-end charts ===
2009 year-end chart performance for "Haven't Met You Yet"
Chart (2009)	Position
Canada (Canadian Hot 100)	84
Italy (FIMI)	45
Netherlands (Dutch Top 40)	40
Netherlands (Single Top 100)	87
UK Singles (OCC)	62
US Adult Contemporary (Billboard)	25

2010 year-end chart performance for "Haven't Met You Yet"
Chart (2010)	Position
Australia (ARIA)	64
Belgium (Ultratop Wallonia)	56
Canada (Canadian Hot 100)	31
Japanese Adult Contemporary Chart	4
Japanese Digital Track Chart	30
UK Singles (OCC)	134
US Billboard Hot 100	39
US Adult Contemporary (Billboard)	3
US Adult Top 40 (Billboard)	13

=== Certifications ===
Certifications and sales for "Haven't Met You Yet"
Region	Certification	Certified units/sales
Australia (ARIA)	2× Platinum	140,000^{^}
Canada (Music Canada)	Platinum	80,000^{*}
Denmark (IFPI Danmark)	Gold	45,000^{‡}
Italy (FIMI)	Gold	10,000^{*}
New Zealand (RMNZ)	Platinum	30,000^{‡}
United Kingdom (BPI)	2× Platinum	1,200,000^{‡}
United States (RIAA)	Platinum	1,000,000^{*}
^{*} Sales figures based on certification alone.^{^} Shipments figures based on certification alone.^{‡} Sales+streaming figures based on certification alone.

== Nick Jonas version ==
"Haven't Met You Yet"

Single by Nick Jonas

from the album The Music of Smash
- Released: February 27, 2012
- Recorded: 2012
- Genre: Jazz; pop
- Length: 2:21 (album version)
- Label: Columbia
- Songwriters: Michael Bublé; Alan Chang; Amy Foster-Gilles
- Producers: Marc Shaiman; Scott Wittman; Ryan Tedder

Nick Jonas singles chronology
"Joy to the World (A Christmas Prayer)" (2004)	"Haven't Met You Yet" (2012)	"Chains" (2014)

On February 27, 2012, Nick Jonas covered the song in the TV series Smash in the episode "The Cost of Art". He performed the song behind a piano at a party that was given to him. The cover was released as a single on March 6, 2012 and appeared on the series soundtrack, which was released May 1, 2012.

=== Background and composition ===
"Haven't Met You Yet"
A 14 second sample of "Haven't Met You Yet" by Nick Jonas, where a portion of the chorus is heard.

Nick Jonas was announced to guest-star on the show on October 11, 2011. His character of Lyle West is described as "a hot sitcom star who started his career as a child actor in a Broadway show written by Tom (Christian Borle) and directed by Derek (Jack Davenport)." The release also mentioned that Jonas will sing in the episode.

=== Track listing ===
Digital single
No.	Title	Writer(s)	Length
1.	"Haven't Met You Yet" (Nick Jonas version)	Michael Bublé; Alan Chang; Amy Foster-Gilles	2:21

=== Release history ===
Region	Date	Format	Label
Canada	February 27, 2012	Digital download – digital single	Columbia Records
United States	February 27, 2012	Digital download – digital single	Columbia Records
United States	March 6, 2012	Digital download – digital single	Columbia Records
United States	May 1, 2012	Digital download – digital album	Columbia Records

== See also ==
- List of number-one adult contemporary singles of 2010 (U.S.)
