= Some Kind of Wonderful (The Drifters song) =

Single by The Drifters

from the album Save the Last Dance for Me
- B-side: "Honey Bee"
- Released: 1961
- Genre: R&B
- Length: 2:13
- Label: Atlantic
- Songwriters: Gerry Goffin, Carole King
- Producer: Jerry Leiber, Mike Stoller

The Drifters singles chronology
| "I Count the Tears" (1960) | "Some Kind of Wonderful" (1961) | "Please Stay" (1961) |

"Some Kind of Wonderful" is a song by Gerry Goffin and Carole King that was first released by the Drifters in 1961. The lead vocalist on the recording is Rudy Lewis. (It is not related to another song of the same name which was written by John Ellison and first released by Soul Brothers Six in 1967).

The Drifters' original recording of the Goffin/King song reached No. 32 on the US Billboard pop chart and No. 6 on the US Billboard R&B chart.

Notable covers include versions by both Little Eva (1962) and her sister Idalia Boyd (1963), Marvin Gaye (1967), Jay and the Americans (1970), Carole King (1971), Peter Cincotti (2004), Aled Jones featuring Cerys Matthews (2007), and Michael Bublé on the deluxe editions of his fourth studio album, Crazy Love (2009).

On the double album The Drifters 24 Original Hits (UK, 1975, Atlantic Records), the song is mistakenly credited to John Ellison.
