= It's a Beautiful Day (Michael Bublé song) =

2013 single by Michael Bublé

Single by Michael Bublé

from the album To Be Loved
- Released: February 25, 2013
- Recorded: 2013
- Genre: Sunshine pop
- Length: 3:19
- Label: 143; Reprise
- Songwriters: Michael Bublé; Alan Chang; Amy S. Foster
- Producer: Bob Rock

Michael Bublé singles chronology
| "White Christmas" (2012) | "It's a Beautiful Day" (2013) | "Close Your Eyes" (2013) |

Music video
- "Michael Bublé - It's A Beautiful Day [Official Music Video]" on YouTube

Audio sample
- A 20-second sample of "It's a Beautiful Day" by Michael Bublé, where the chorus is heard.: file; help

"It's a Beautiful Day" is a song by Canadian singer Michael Bublé, released as the first single from his sixth studio album, To Be Loved (2013). The song was written by Bublé, Alan Chang, and Amy S. Foster, and produced by Bob Rock. The single was released on iTunes on February 25, 2013, by 143 Records and Reprise Records. It peaked at number ten on the UK Singles Chart and it was certified gold by the Federation of the Italian Music Industry. The song also charted to top five in Belgium, Finland, Indonesia, and Japan.

== Critical reception ==
Music blog POP! Goes the Charts described the song as "surprisingly cheerful", noting its full arrangement and descriptive lyrics, and concluding that it would be a "huge seller".

== Music video ==
A music video to accompany the release of "It's a Beautiful Day" was first released onto YouTube on March 25, 2013, at a total length of three minutes and fifty-one seconds. It was filmed on Colonial Street, the same street that appeared as Wisteria Lane in the series Desperate Housewives. Actress Jaime Pressly plays Bublé's unfaithful girlfriend in the video. The video begins with Bublé catching his partner cheating on him in a house. Afterwards, Bublé calmly walks out of the house and starts performing the song while he walks down the street. While performing the song, he encounters many people, most of them being women who appear to be expressing romantic interest on Bublé, while his partner watches him from the window with discomfort. At the end of the video, Bublé is seen in front of an exploding house. The video includes a few computer-generated images such as an animated bird perching on Bublé's finger and clouds with various animal shapes. As of July 2024, the music video has 66 million views on YouTube.

== Live performances ==
On March 23, 2013, he performed the song live on long-running German-language entertainment television show Wetten, dass..?. He also performed the song live on Ant & Dec's Saturday Night Takeaway on March 30, 2013, and during his performance, Ant & Dec, Simon Cowell and Lewis Hamilton left the ITV studios on a golf buggy, and ran into a pub, Bublé then walks across the studio to find cardboard cutouts of Ant & Dec, he then leaves the studio with his band singing and walks to the pub and has a go at the karaoke version of "Let's Get Ready to Rhumble". Bublé performed "It's a Beautiful Day (Swing Version)" on The X Factor (U.S. season 3) Week 5 Result Show on November 28.

== Track listing ==
- German CD single
1. "It's a Beautiful Day" - 3:25
2. "Hollywood" - 3:35
- 7" vinyl
1. "It's a Beautiful Day" - 3:25
2. "Hollywood" - 3:34
- It's A Beautiful Day EP
1. "It's a Beautiful Day" - 3:25
2. "You'll Never Find Another Love Like Mine"
3. "Home"
4. "Me and Mrs Jones"
5. "At This Moment"
- Digital download
1. "It's a Beautiful Day" - 3:25

== Charts and certifications ==
=== Weekly charts ===
| Chart (2013–14) | Peak position |
|---|---|
| Australia (ARIA) | 33 |
| Austria (Ö3 Austria Top 40) | 24 |
| Belgium (Ultratip Bubbling Under Flanders) | 40 |
| Belgium (Ultratip Bubbling Under Wallonia) | 5 |
| Canada Hot 100 (Billboard) | 20 |
| Czech Republic Airplay (ČNS IFPI) | 46 |
| Denmark (Tracklisten) | 40 |
| Finland (Suomen virallinen radiolista) | 3 |
| France (SNEP) | 81 |
| Germany (GfK) | 28 |
| Iceland (Tónlist) | 13 |
| Ireland (IRMA) | 28 |
| Israel International Airplay (Media Forest) | 7 |
| Italy (FIMI) | 16 |
| Japan Hot 100 (Billboard) | 4 |
| Netherlands (Dutch Top 40) | 13 |
| Netherlands (Single Top 100) | 24 |
| Scotland Singles (OCC) | 9 |
| Slovakia Airplay (ČNS IFPI) | 83 |
| Slovenia (SloTop50) | 20 |
| South Africa (EMA) | 9 |
| Spain (PROMUSICAE) | 42 |
| Switzerland (Schweizer Hitparade) | 32 |
| UK Singles (OCC) | 10 |
| US Billboard Hot 100 | 94 |
| US Adult Pop Airplay (Billboard) | 22 |
| US Adult Contemporary (Billboard) | 7 |

=== Year-end charts ===
| Chart (2013) | Position |
|---|---|
| Canada (Canadian Hot 100) | 86 |
| Japan (Japan Hot 100) | 77 |
| Italy (FIMI) | 89 |
| Netherlands (Dutch Top 40) | 46 |
| UK Singles (Official Charts Company) | 139 |
| US Adult Contemporary (Billboard) | 12 |

=== Certifications ===
| Region | Certification | Certified units/sales |
|---|---|---|
| Australia (ARIA) | Gold | 35,000^{^} |
| Italy (FIMI) | Gold | 15,000^{*} |
| New Zealand (RMNZ) | Gold | 7,500^{*} |
| United Kingdom (BPI) | Gold | 400,000^{‡} |
^{*} Sales figures based on certification alone.^{^} Shipments figures based on certification alone.^{‡} Sales+streaming figures based on certification alone.

== Release history ==
| Region | Date | Format | Label |
|---|---|---|---|
| Germany | February 25, 2013 | CD single; digital download; vinyl | 143 Records, Reprise Records |
| United States | March 20, 2013 | CD single; digital download; EP | 143 Records, Reprise Records |
| Canada | March 20, 2013 | CD single; digital download; EP | 143 Records, Reprise Records |
| United Kingdom | March 31, 2013 | Digital download | 143 Records, Reprise Records |
