= Hold On (Michael Bublé song) =

Single by Michael Bublé

from the album Crazy Love
- B-side: "Let It Snow, Let It Snow, Let It Snow" (Live)
- Released: December 11, 2009 (U.K.); January 24, 2010 (U.S.)
- Recorded: 2009
- Genre: Pop
- Length: 4:05
- Label: 143 Records; Reprise
- Songwriters: Michael Bublé; Alan Chang; Amy Foster-Gillies
- Producer: Bob Rock

Michael Bublé singles chronology
"Haven't Met You Yet" (2009)	"Hold On" (2009)	"Baby (You've Got What It Takes)" (2010)

Licensed audio
- "Hold On" on YouTube

"Hold On" is a song by Canadian crooner Michael Bublé, released as the second single from his fourth studio album, Crazy Love. The single was released on December 11, 2009, although it was serviced to radio again on February 14, 2011, after its appearance in an episode of the talent series Dancing on Ice.

== Background ==
The single was released on December 11, 2009, in the United Kingdom, before a release in the United States followed on January 24, 2010. Prior to the release of the music video, a lyric video was made available via Bublé's official YouTube account. The song debuted on radio on Magic 105.4 FM in November 2009, three weeks before the music video, again directed by Rich Lee, premiered. Two main remixes of the song were issued alongside its release, including versions by J.R. Rotem and Chris Lord-Alge. The single was once again serviced to radio on February 14, 2011, after its appearance in an episode of the talent series Dancing on Ice.

== Track listing ==
- Digital download
1. "Hold On" (UK Radio Mix) - 4:07
2. "Let It Snow, Let It Snow, Let It Snow" (Live) - 2:24
- Promotional CD single
1. "Hold On" (JR Rotem Mix) - 3:51
2. "Hold On" (Chris Lord Alge Radio Mix) - 4:07
3. "Hold On" (UK Radio Mix) - 4:07
4. "Hold On" (Album Version) - 4:05

== Charts ==
=== Weekly charts ===
Chart (2009–11)	Peak position
Canada Hot 100 (Billboard)	87
Canada AC (Billboard)	5
Italy (FIMI)	44
Netherlands (Dutch Top 40 Tipparade)	5
UK Singles (OCC)	72
US Adult Contemporary (Billboard)	9

=== Year-end charts ===
Chart (2011)	Rank
US Adult Contemporary (Billboard)	16
