= Alan Chang =

American pianist and songwriter

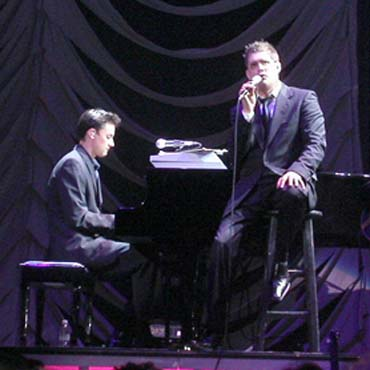
- Alan Chang (left) on tour with Michael Bublé (right)

Background information
- Born: December 4, 1979 (age 46); San Jose, California, U.S.
- Genres: Big band, rock, pop, jazz, lounge
- Occupations: Songwriter, jazz pianist, music director

Alan Peijei Chang (born December 4, 1979) is an American pianist and songwriter, best known for his work with Michael Bublé.

== Biography ==
Originally from San Jose, California, he graduated from the University of Southern California's Thornton School of Music with a degree in jazz studies in 2002.

Chang began his passion for jazz at Castillero Middle School. At the age of 13, Chang began accompanying nearby Pioneer High School with their daily musical rehearsals as well as a local dance studio. When Chang attended Pioneer High School, he soon received local recognition for his playing, and by his senior year he had recorded an independent "senior project". The CD included original compositions and was sold locally to recoup recording expenses. Later that year Chang was selected as one of two pianists to the San Francisco High School Grammy Band.

After graduating from USC's Thornton School of Music, Chang was discovered and asked to audition for an up-and-coming artist, Michael Bublé. Since 2003, Chang has been Bublé's musical director and pianist, traveling the world to sold-out shows, radio, and television appearances. In 2023, he released the single "Love As A Weapon," which he wrote with his fiancée, musician Alex Lilly.

== Works ==
In 2005, Chang co-wrote "Home" with Bublé and Amy Foster-Gillies. By 2007, his writing credentials included "Everything" and "Lost", both off of Bublé's album Call Me Irresponsible. Chang co-wrote and co-produced tracks from Buble's release Crazy Love. Chang co-wrote the first single, "Haven't Met You Yet", and the second single, "Hold On". Also, Chang was a co-producer on the tracks "Stardust" and "You're Nobody till Somebody Loves You". For Bublé's 2011 Christmas album, Chang co-wrote the only original song, "Cold December Night". He also arranged Have Yourself a Merry Little Christmas. In 2016, he co-produced Bublé's album Nobody but Me.

On November 15, 2011, Chang produced and released the inspirational holiday album "Cold December Night." The album features "melancholy interpretations of Christmas songs envisioned by various members of Michael Bublé's touring band."

In addition to his writing credentials with Michael Bublé, Chang co-wrote two tracks with singer Josh Kelley on his album To Remember: "Walk Right In" and "More Than Love". Chang also co-wrote "Stargazing" for X Factor champion Leon Jackson. The track is on his debut album Right Now. Chang has also co-wrote "Giant" from The Voice (US)" Season 1 winner Javier Colon's album Gravity.

Chang is also a member of the Los Angeles-area rock band formerly known as The Cosmic Giggle and The Good Night; it is currently known as Your Future Lovers.
