= Everything (Michael Bublé song) =

Single by Michael Bublé

from the album Call Me Irresponsible
- B-side: "These Foolish Things (Remind Me of You)"
- Released: April 23, 2007
- Genre: Traditional pop, jazz, easy listening
- Length: 3:33
- Label: 143, Reprise
- Songwriters: Michael Bublé, Alan Chang, Amy Foster-Gilles
- Producer: Bob Rock

Michael Bublé singles chronology
"Save the Last Dance for Me" (2006)	"Everything" (2007)	"Me and Mrs. Jones" (2007)

Music video
- "Everything" on YouTube

"Everything" is a song recorded by Canadian singer Michael Bublé, and released on April 23, 2007, as the lead single from his fifth studio album, Call Me Irresponsible.

== Background ==
Bublé wrote the lyrics of "Everything" for his then girlfriend Emily Blunt. He later explained: "I wrote the song about the great happiness of real love, but at the same time I was making a statement about the world. We're living in really crazy times, and I wanted to say that no matter what's happening, this person in my life is what really makes it worthwhile." Unlike Bublé's other work, this song strays away from being big band oriented, carrying some elements of pop and rock. It is completely devoid of a horn section, as well as being guitar driven. A piano and an acoustic guitar carry the main melody of the song, with electric guitars audible in the chorus. Bublé's vocal arrangement is also different from his previous material; his voice often makes big interval changes in most of his material, but his voice in this particular song is projected smoothly without going into loud intervals. It is comparable to his previous hit single, "Home", from the album It's Time.

The music video for the song features scenes of Bublé performing the song into a mic, as well as holding an open audition for actors and entertainers to appear in the video, finally choosing the right candidate at the end. In Italy, the song topped the digital singles chart in April 2007, before reaching the top of the overall singles chart over a year later in June 2008. Bono and Whoopi Goldberg make cameo appearances for auditions in the video.

== Track listings ==
- UK CD single 1 and 7-inch vinyl
1. "Everything" (Album Version) - 3:36
2. "Home" (American Remix) - 4:04
- UK CD single 2
1. "Everything" (Album Version) - 3:36
2. "These Foolish Things (Remind Me of You)" - 4:48
3. "Everything" (Alternative Mix) - 3:30

== Chart performance ==
=== Weekly charts ===
Chart (2007–2008)	Peak position
Australia (ARIA)	19
Austria (Ö3 Austria Top 40)	34
Belgium (Ultratip Bubbling Under Flanders)	2
Belgium (Ultratip Bubbling Under Wallonia)	4
Canada Hot 100 (Billboard)	10
Denmark (Tracklisten)	19
European Hot 100 Singles (Billboard)	29
Hungary (Rádiós Top 40)	9
Ireland (IRMA)	39
Italy (FIMI)	1
Netherlands (Dutch Top 40)	9
Netherlands (Single Top 100)	5
Norway (VG-lista)	8
Portugal (Billboard)	6
Sweden (Sverigetopplistan)	43
Switzerland (Schweizer Hitparade)	28
UK Singles (OCC)	38
US Billboard Hot 100	46
US Adult Pop Airplay (Billboard)	31
US Adult Contemporary (Billboard)	1
US Jazz Songs (Billboard)	12

=== Year-end charts ===
Chart (2007)	Position
Australia (ARIA)	87
Hungary (Rádiós Top 40)	62
Italy (FIMI)	17
Netherlands (Dutch Top 40)	20
Netherlands (Single Top 100)	10
US Adult Contemporary (Billboard)	4

== Certifications ==
Region	Certification	Certified units/sales
Denmark (IFPI Danmark)	Platinum	90,000^{‡}
Italy (FIMI)	Gold	25,000^{‡}
New Zealand (RMNZ)	Platinum	30,000^{‡}
United Kingdom (BPI)	Platinum	600,000^{‡}
United States (RIAA)	Platinum	1,000,000^{*}
^{*} Sales figures based on certification alone.^{‡} Sales+streaming figures based on certification alone.

== Cover versions ==
Actor and musician Joe Lara released a cover version on August 18, 2019 in honor of him and his wife Gwen Shamblin Lara's one year wedding anniversary.

== See also ==
- List of Billboard Adult Contemporary number ones of 2007
- List of number-one digital songs of 2007 (Italy)
- List of number-one hits of 2008 (Italy)
