= Home (Michael Bublé song) =

2005 Michael Bublé song

Single by Michael Bublé

from the album It's Time
- Released: January 24, 2005
- Genre: Pop; jazz
- Length: 3:45
- Label: 143; Reprise
- Songwriters: Michael Bublé; Alan Chang; Amy Foster-Gillies
- Producers: David Foster; Humberto Gatica

Michael Bublé singles chronology
"Feeling Good" (2005)	"Home" (2005)	"Save the Last Dance for Me" (2006)

Music video
- "Home" on YouTube

"Home" is a song by Canadian singer Michael Bublé, and released on January 24, 2005, as the first single from his fourth studio album, It's Time. The song was written by Bublé, along with co-writers Alan Chang and Amy Foster-Gillies. Bublé's version was a number-one single on the Adult Contemporary chart formats of both Canada and the United States, in addition to certifying platinum in both countries as well as finding chart success internationally. Following his original version in 2005, two cover versions were successful by other artists: one by Irish group Westlife in 2007, and one by American singer Blake Shelton in 2008.

== Background and lyrics ==
"Home" centralizes on the narrator, who is separated from his lover, possibly a spouse, while off travelling. He expresses a desire to return home and be with his lover. Bublé had been away touring in Italy when he co-wrote the lyrics, for his then-fiancée, Debbie Timuss. Bublé describes his loneliness from missing her in the lyrics. Aaron Latham of Allmusic, in his review of It's Time, described the song favorably. He called it a "positive step forward" for Bublé, adding "The success of this ballad provides yet another direction that he can explore and expand upon."

The song is in the key of G major, with a chord pattern of G-D/F♯-Em-D-C-D-G. It has a time signature of 4/4 and an approximate tempo of 64 beats per minute.

== Release ==
"Home" was the second single released from It's Time on March 28, 2005. It was Bublé's first single released in the United Kingdom. The single was a hit, topping the Billboard Adult Contemporary chart in the United States while peaking at number 31 in the United Kingdom. The release was accompanied by a music video, directed by Noble Jones, who had previously filmed the video for "Feeling Good". The song was also used in the film The Wedding Date.

Subsequently, two cover versions of the song have also been released as singles by other artists. The first of these was recorded by Irish boyband Westlife, whose version was a top ten hit in several European countries. American country music singer Blake Shelton also released his version in early 2008, which reached the top of the American country singles charts. In December 2011, Bublé performed a duet version of the song with English singer-songwriter Gary Barlow, whilst also performing Barlow's "Rule the World". Soon after, a petition was set up for the collaboration to be made available for digital download, to challenge for the United Kingdom Christmas Number One spot. On Bublé's 2012 Christmas television special "Michael Bublé: Home for the Holidays", he and Blake Shelton sang a duet version with lyrics reworked for the Christmas season; this version previously appeared on Shelton's holiday album, Cheers, It's Christmas. In 2023, Bublé performed another duet cover version of the song with Cher on her Christmas album, Christmas.

== Track listing ==
UK CD single 1 (Debut release)

1. "Home" (U.K. Radio Mix) - 3:23
2. "Home" (Album Version) - 3:45

UK CD single 2 (Debut release)

1. "Home" (UK radio mix) - 3:23
2. "Home" (album version) - 3:45
3. "Nice N'Easy" - 4:11
4. "Home" (music video) - 3:54

UK CD single (Second release)

1. "Home" (album version) - 3:45
2. "Song For You" (featuring Chris Botti) - 3:12

== Charts ==
=== Weekly charts ===
Chart (2005–2006)	Peak position
Australia (ARIA)	35
Austria (Ö3 Austria Top 40)	36
Canada AC Top 30 (Radio & Records)	1
Canada CHR/Pop Top 30 (Radio & Records)	19
Canada Country Top 30 (Radio & Records)	29
Canada Hot AC Top 30 (Radio & Records)	4
Germany (GfK)	55
Netherlands (Single Top 100)	56
Scotland Singles (OCC)	21
Sweden (Sverigetopplistan)	55
Switzerland (Schweizer Hitparade)	33
UK Singles (OCC)	31
US Billboard Hot 100	72
US Adult Contemporary (Billboard)	1
US Adult Pop Airplay (Billboard)	24
US Smooth Jazz Airplay (Billboard)	23

Chart (2011)	Peak position
Canada (Nielsen SoundScan)	36

=== Year-end charts ===
Chart (2005)	Position
US Adult Contemporary (Billboard)	3
US Adult Top 40 (Billboard)	80

== Certifications ==
Region	Certification	Certified units/sales
Canada (Music Canada)	Platinum	20,000^{*}
Denmark (IFPI Danmark)	Gold	45,000^{‡}
Italy (FIMI)	Gold	15,000^{‡}
New Zealand (RMNZ)	Platinum	30,000^{‡}
Spain (Promusicae)	Gold	30,000^{‡}
United Kingdom (BPI)	Platinum	600,000^{‡}
United States (RIAA)	Platinum	1,000,000^{*}
^{*} Sales figures based on certification alone.^{‡} Sales+streaming figures based on certification alone.

== Release history ==
Region	Date	Format(s)	Label(s)	Ref.
United States	January 24, 2005	Adult contemporary radio	143; Reprise	
United Kingdom	March 28, 2005	CD	143; Reprise	
Australia	May 2, 2005	CD	143; Reprise	
United States	June 20, 2005	Hot adult contemporary radio	143; Reprise	

== Westlife version ==
"Home"

Single by Westlife

from the album Back Home
- B-side: "Hard to Say I'm Sorry"
- Released: October 29, 2007
- Studio: Rokstone (London, UK)
- Length: 3:26
- Label: Sony BMG
- Songwriters: Michael Bublé; Alan Chang; Amy Foster-Gillies
- Producer: Steve Mac

Westlife singles chronology
"The Rose" (2006)	"Home" (2007)	"Us Against the World" (2008)

Music video
- "Home" on YouTube

Irish boy band Westlife released a cover version of "Home" as their first single from their eighth studio album, Back Home (2007). Westlife's version differs slightly in their lyrical arrangement as compared to Michael Bublé's version. The single sold over 200,000 copies in the UK alone and was certified silver, peaking at number three on the UK Singles Chart. It is the band's 15th best-selling single in paid-for sales and in combined sales in the UK as of January 2019. The song was ranked number 91 on MTV Asia's list of Top 100 Hits of 2007. A cover of Chicago's "Hard to Say I'm Sorry" was included as the B-side for the single and charted individually on the official UK Singles Chart at number 135.

=== Music video ===
The music video for this single was shot in Vancouver using interior and exterior shots of the Orpheum Theater. The exterior shots of the marquee are on Granville Street. A short preview of the video was posted on the band's official website on October 5, 2007. The full video was made available during the later part of the day on The Box. It was directed by Mike Lipscombe and features the band in front of a Boeing 747 plane along with scenes of loved ones meeting each other at the airport.

=== Track listings ===
UK CD1

1. "Home" (single mix)
2. "Hard to Say I'm Sorry"

UK CD2

1. "Home" (single mix)
2. "Total Eclipse of the Heart" (Sunset Strippers Full Dance Mix)
3. "Home" (Soul Seekerz Remix – radio edit)

=== Charts ===
==== Weekly charts ====
Chart (2007)	Peak position
Europe (Eurochart Hot 100)	11
Germany (GfK)	70
Ireland (IRMA)	2
Ireland Download (GfK Chart-Track)	4
Norway (VG-lista)	7
Scotland Singles (OCC)	2
Slovakia Airplay (ČNS IFPI)	59
Sweden (Sverigetopplistan)	8
UK Singles (OCC)	3
UK Airplay (Music Week)	30
UK Physical Singles (OCC)	2

==== Year-end charts ====
Chart (2007)	Position
Ireland (IRMA)	14
Taiwan (Hito Radio)	72
UK Singles (OCC)	43

=== Certifications ===
Region	Certification	Certified units/sales
United Kingdom (BPI)	Silver	200,000^{^}
^{^} Shipments figures based on certification alone.

== Blake Shelton version ==
"Home"

Single by Blake Shelton

from the album Pure BS
- Released: February 4, 2008
- Genre: Country
- Length: 3:50
- Label: Warner Bros. Nashville
- Songwriters: Michael Bublé; Alan Chang; Amy Foster-Gillies
- Producer: Brent Rowan

Blake Shelton singles chronology
"The More I Drink" (2007)	"Home" (2008)	"She Wouldn't Be Gone" (2008)

Music video
- "Home" on YouTube

A version was released by American country music singer Blake Shelton on February 1, 2008. This cover entered the Billboard Hot Country Songs chart at number 60 for the week of February 12, 2008. It was included on a June 2008 re-issue of Shelton's 2007 album Pure BS and Blake Shelton Collector's Edition, an EP which is only available at Walmart. Shelton's rendition features backing vocals from Miranda Lambert.

Shelton's version of the song reached Number One on the Billboard Hot Country Songs charts dated for the week of July 19, 2008, becoming the fourth Number One hit of his career, and his first since "Some Beach" in December 2004. His version also reached number 41 on the Billboard Hot 100.

Shelton occasionally performed the song with Bublé in concert. In 2012, he e-mailed Bublé, asking if he would write new lyrics for a Christmas version of the song and sing duet vocals on it. The re-written version, featuring Bublé, appears on Shelton's 2012 album, Cheers, It's Christmas.

=== Charts ===
==== Weekly charts ====
Chart (2008)	Peak position
Canada Country (Billboard)	36
US Billboard Hot 100	41
US Hot Country Songs (Billboard)	1

Chart (2012)^{A}	Peak position
US Hot Country Songs (Billboard)	36
US Country Airplay (Billboard)	45

Chart (2013)^{B}	Peak position
US Bubbling Under Hot 100 Singles	19
US Hot Country Songs (Billboard)	36

- ^{A}Christmas re-recording with Michael Bublé.
- ^{B}Live recording with Usher.

==== Year-end charts ====
Chart (2008)	Position
US Country Songs (Billboard)	5

=== Certifications ===
Region	Certification	Certified units/sales
New Zealand (RMNZ)	Gold	15,000^{‡}
United States (RIAA)	Platinum	1,000,000^{‡}
^{‡} Sales+streaming figures based on certification alone.

== Other notable recordings ==
- A duet cover of "Home" was recorded by Tommy Ward and Mark Winston Kirk and uploaded to Facebook in August 2020. The video received more than 3 million views in the first 22 days.

== See also ==
- List of Billboard Adult Contemporary number ones of 2005
