= An Evening with Michael Bublé =

2019–22 concert tour by Michael Bublé

- World tour by Michael Bublé
- Promotional poster for the tour
- Associated album: Love
- Start date: February 13, 2019
- End date: July 25, 2022
- Legs: 7
- No. of shows: 151

Michael Bublé concert chronology
- To Be Loved Tour (2013–2015); An Evening with Michael Bublé (2019–2022); Higher Tour (2022–2023)

An Evening with Michael Bublé was the sixth concert tour by Canadian singer Michael Bublé. Launched in support of his tenth studio album, Love (2018), the tour began on February 13, 2019, in Tampa and played 152 shows throughout North America, Europe and Australia.

== Background ==
Following the announcement of his son's cancer diagnosis, Bublé took a break from recording and touring. In the spring of 2018, it was revealed the singer completed recording his tenth album and retirement rumors began to spread, as he mentioned his family was his main priority and he no longer had the desire for fame. He performed a few spot stadium concerts in Dublin, London and Sydney during the summer of 2018. The tour was officially announced November 2018 on the singer's Instagram. Jokingly referred to as the "Don't Believe the Rumors Tour" or the "Don't Stop the Rumors Tour", Bublé and his publicist confirmed there were no plans to retire. Shortly after the tour was announced, PBS released the singer's concert special, "Tour Stop 148". Airing November 24, 2018, the special was featured as an installment of the station's long-running series, Great Performances.

During an interview with Billboard, Bublé expressed his excitement with returning to touring. He stated:

"I'm going to go back to what I was made to do. I'm going to come back to a world that needs love and romance and laughter more than it has in a long time. I'm going to be a conduit to that. This is the greatest record I've ever made."

=== Fire Fight Australia benefit concert ===
During his concert on 16 February 2020 at Rod Laver Arena in Melbourne, Australia, there was a live cross with three songs to the Fire Fight Australia benefit concert at Stadium Australia in Sydney to raise funds for the national bushfire relief following the Black Summer bushfires, which had an attendance of 75,000 and a live television audience peaking at 4.7 million viewers. The live charity album Artists Unite for Fire Fight: Concert for National Bushfire Relief, included his song Such a Night from the live cross. The album debuted at number one on the Australian albums chart.

== Critical reception ==
The tour received overwhelming praise from music critics and was treated as a welcomed return by the fans. Gabe Echazabal from Creative Loafing Tampa Bay described the concert at the Amalie Arena as a night full of love. He wrote: "Still, Bublé’s greatest asset — his voice — gained strength and richness as the night progressed. He was as potent during his stirring version of 'My Funny Valentine' as he was infectious during an homage to former singer and trumpet player Louis Prima. [...] Bublé turned the event into a dance party. As a nod to those who may feel uncomfortable or uneasy cutting loose, Bublé put no pressure on those folks".

In Pittsburgh, Patti Conley (of The Beaver County Times) followed the sentiments of Echazabal, describing the performance as heartfelt. She continued to say: "For two hours, Buble shared center stage with a 36-piece orchestra that impeccably accompanied and grounded him on a musical journey of life's highs and deepest lows. Buble sang and sashayed as if he were fingers on piano keys, running up steps to the orchestra, walking a runway touching outstretched hands and stopping to pose for selfies, and dancing — sort of — to whatever tempo the tunes demanded. He jumped like a jack-in-the-box".

Nancy J. Parisi of The Buffalo News says the show at the KeyBank Center was a triumphant return to form for Bublé. She goes on to say: "Thirty-four musicians, seated on four tiers, began 'Feeling Good' as an onstage circular monitor above undulated with red shimmering shapes. Bublé emerged in his signature blue suit, making his way down the staircase, singing, as the monitor's imagery morphed into a giant moon behind him. This arresting imagery flowed into a show highlighting what is known as The Great American Songbook, beloved classics, with a handful of Bublé pop compositions interspersed".

== Setlist ==
This set list is representative of the performance on February 17, 2019, in Duluth, Georgia. It does not represent the set list at all concerts for the duration of the tour.

1. "Feeling Good"
2. "Haven't Met You Yet"
3. "My Funny Valentine"
4. "I Only Have Eyes for You"
5. "Sway"
6. "Such a Night"
7. "(Up A) Lazy River"
8. "When You're Smiling"
9. "Fly Me to the Moon"
10. "You're Nobody till Somebody Loves You"
11. "When I Fall in Love"
12. "Love You Anymore"
13. "Forever Now"
14. "Home"
15. "Buona Sera Signorina"
16. "Just a Gigolo" / "I Ain't Got Nobody"
17. "You Never Can Tell"
18. "Save the Last Dance for Me"
19. "Nobody but Me"
20. "Cry Me a River"

Encore

21. "Where or When"
22. "Everything"
23. "Always on My Mind"

== Tour dates ==
List of 2019 concerts
Date	City	Country	Venue	Attendance	Revenue
February 13, 2019	Tampa	United States	Amalie Arena	13,548 / 13,548	$1,683,607
February 15, 2019	Sunrise	United States	BB&T Center	12,794 / 12,794	$1,755,817
February 16, 2019	Orlando	United States	Amway Center	11,634 / 11,634	$1,457,674
February 17, 2019	Duluth	United States	Infinite Energy Center	9,962 / 9,962	$1,349,029
February 19, 2019	Washington, D.C.	United States	Capital One Arena	12,261 / 12,261	$1,534,292
February 20, 2019	New York City	United States	Madison Square Garden	11,517 / 11,517	$1,911,805
February 22, 2019	Pittsburgh	United States	PPG Paints Arena	12,608 / 12,608	$1,495,889
February 23, 2019	Newark	United States	Prudential Center	11,855 / 11,855	$1,704,476
February 24, 2019	Philadelphia	United States	Wells Fargo Center	13,089 / 13,089	$1,569,148
February 26, 2019	Worcester	United States	DCU Center	8,692 / 8,692	$1,174,528
February 27, 2019	Buffalo	United States	KeyBank Center	12,126 / 12,126	$1,325,822
March 1, 2019	Detroit	United States	Little Caesars Arena	12,294 / 12,294	$1,475,464
March 17, 2019	Rosemont	United States	Allstate Arena	11,826 / 11,826	$1,600,747
March 18, 2019	Saint Paul	United States	Xcel Energy Center	13,161 / 13,161	$1,575,909
March 20, 2019	Kansas City	United States	Sprint Center	12,044 / 12,044	$1,303,939
March 22, 2019	St. Louis	United States	Enterprise Center	12,837 / 12,837	$1,482,490
March 23, 2019	Lincoln	United States	Pinnacle Bank Arena	11,280 / 11,280	$1,199,497
March 25, 2019	Dallas	United States	American Airlines Center	12,616 / 12,616	$1,605,251
March 26, 2019	Houston	United States	Toyota Center	11,285 / 11,285	$1,479,292
March 27, 2019	San Antonio	United States	AT&T Center	12,824 / 12,824	$1,527,331
March 29, 2019	Phoenix	United States	Talking Stick Resort Arena	12,105 / 12,105	$1,516,125
March 30, 2019	Las Vegas	United States	T-Mobile Arena	14,183 / 14,183	$1,692,064
March 31, 2019	San Diego	United States	Pechanga Arena	10,024 / 10,024	$1,227,042
April 2, 2019	Los Angeles	United States	Staples Center	12,701 / 12,701	$1,680,349
April 3, 2019	Oakland	United States	Oracle Arena	12,655 / 12,655	$1,571,154
April 5, 2019	Portland	United States	Moda Center	11,848 / 11,848	$1,369,401
April 6, 2019	Tacoma	United States	Tacoma Dome	15,312 / 15,312	$1,691,521
April 12, 2019	Vancouver	Canada	Rogers Arena	—N/a	—N/a
April 15, 2019	Edmonton	Canada	Rogers Place	—N/a	—N/a
April 18, 2019	Saskatoon	Canada	SaskTel Centre	—N/a	—N/a
April 19, 2019	Winnipeg	Canada	Bell MTS Place	—N/a	—N/a
May 20, 2019	Birmingham	England	Resorts World Arena	22,565 / 22,565	$2,244,390
May 21, 2019	Birmingham	England	Resorts World Arena	22,565 / 22,565	$2,244,390
May 23, 2019	Glasgow	Scotland	SSE Hydro	20,631 / 20,662	$2,482,650
May 24, 2019	Glasgow	Scotland	SSE Hydro	20,631 / 20,662	$2,482,650
May 26, 2019	Manchester	England	Manchester Arena	24,840 / 25,605	$2,429,430
May 27, 2019	Manchester	England	Manchester Arena	24,840 / 25,605	$2,429,430
May 30, 2019	London	England	The O_{2} Arena	44,558 / 44,558	$4,635,090
May 31, 2019	London	England	The O_{2} Arena	44,558 / 44,558	$4,635,090
June 1, 2019	London	England	The O_{2} Arena	44,558 / 44,558	$4,635,090
June 3, 2019	Leeds	England	First Direct Arena	21,087 / 22,536	$2,095,560
June 4, 2019	Leeds	England	First Direct Arena	21,087 / 22,536	$2,095,560
June 6, 2019	Dublin	Ireland	3Arena	—N/a	—N/a
June 7, 2019	Dublin	Ireland	3Arena	—N/a	—N/a
June 9, 2019	Belfast	Northern Ireland	SSE Arena	—N/a	—N/a
June 10, 2019	Belfast	Northern Ireland	SSE Arena	—N/a	—N/a
July 9, 2019	Los Angeles	United States	Staples Center	12,277 / 12,277	$1,564,228
July 10, 2019	Sacramento	United States	Golden 1 Center	11,637 / 11,637	$1,408,095
July 13, 2019	Denver	United States	Pepsi Center	11,096 / 11,096	$1,288,592
July 15, 2019	Tulsa	United States	BOK Center	10,162 / 10,162	$1,071,164
July 17, 2019	New Orleans	United States	Smoothie King Center	11,150 / 11,150	$1,179,339
July 19, 2019	Nashville	United States	Bridgestone Arena	12,698 / 12,698	$1,531,682
July 20, 2019	Rosemont	United States	Allstate Arena	11,582 / 11,582	$1,468,006
July 21, 2019	Columbus	United States	Value City Arena	11,479 / 11,479	$1,405,598
July 23, 2019	Providence	United States	Dunkin' Donuts Center	8,892 / 8,892	$1,156,894
July 24, 2019	New York City	United States	Madison Square Garden	11,567 / 11,567	$1,751,958
July 26, 2019	Toronto	Canada	Scotiabank Arena	—N/a	—N/a
July 27, 2019	Toronto	Canada	Scotiabank Arena	—N/a	—N/a
July 29, 2019	London	Canada	Budweiser Gardens	—N/a	—N/a
July 30, 2019	Ottawa	Canada	Canadian Tire Centre	—N/a	—N/a
August 1, 2019	Montreal	Canada	Bell Centre	11,321 / 26,435	$2,348,210
August 2, 2019	Montreal	Canada	Bell Centre	11,321 / 26,435	$2,348,210
August 3, 2019	Quebec City	Canada	Videotron Centre	10,459 / 11,173	$1,091,260
September 14, 2019	Sofia	Bulgaria	Armeets Arena	—N/a	—N/a
September 16, 2019	Zagreb	Croatia	Arena Zagreb	—N/a	—N/a
September 17, 2019	Prague	Czech Republic	O_{2} Arena	—N/a	—N/a
September 19, 2019	Łódź	Poland	Atlas Arena	—N/a	—N/a
September 20, 2019	Kraków	Poland	Tauron Arena	—N/a	—N/a
September 21, 2019	Vienna	Austria	Wiener Stadthalle	—N/a	—N/a
September 23, 2019	Milan	Italy	Mediolanum Forum	—N/a	—N/a
September 24, 2019	Milan	Italy	Mediolanum Forum	—N/a	—N/a
September 25, 2019	Zürich	Switzerland	Hallenstadion	—N/a	—N/a
September 27, 2019	Barcelona	Spain	Palau Sant Jordi	—N/a	—N/a
September 28, 2019	Madrid	Spain	WiZink Center	—N/a	—N/a
September 30, 2019	Lisbon	Portugal	Altice Arena	—N/a	—N/a
October 1, 2019	Lisbon	Portugal	Altice Arena	—N/a	—N/a
October 21, 2019	Helsinki	Finland	Hartwall Arena	—N/a	—N/a
October 23, 2019	Stockholm	Sweden	Ericsson Globe	—N/a	—N/a
October 24, 2019	Fornebu	Norway	Telenor Arena	—N/a	—N/a
October 26, 2019	Copenhagen	Denmark	Royal Arena	—N/a	—N/a
October 27, 2019	Copenhagen	Denmark	Royal Arena	—N/a	—N/a
October 29, 2019	Hannover	Germany	TUI Arena	—N/a	—N/a
October 30, 2019	Berlin	Germany	Mercedes-Benz Arena	—N/a	—N/a
October 31, 2019	Hamburg	Germany	Barclaycard Arena	—N/a	—N/a
November 2, 2019	Amsterdam	Netherlands	Ziggo Dome	—N/a	—N/a
November 3, 2019	Antwerp	Belgium	Sportpaleis	—N/a	—N/a
November 5, 2019	Cologne	Germany	Lanxess Arena	—N/a	—N/a
November 6, 2019	Oberhausen	Germany	König Pilsener Arena	—N/a	—N/a
November 8, 2019	Mannheim	Germany	SAP Arena	—N/a	—N/a
November 9, 2019	Leipzig	Germany	Arena Leipzig	—N/a	—N/a
November 10, 2019	Munich	Germany	Olympiahalle	—N/a	—N/a
November 27, 2019	Aberdeen	Scotland	P&J Live	—N/a	—N/a
November 28, 2019	Aberdeen	Scotland	P&J Live	—N/a	—N/a
November 30, 2019	Newcastle	England	Utilita Arena Newcastle	—N/a	—N/a
December 1, 2019	Newcastle	England	Utilita Arena Newcastle	—N/a	—N/a
December 3, 2019	Liverpool	England	M&S Bank Arena	—N/a	—N/a
December 4, 2019	Liverpool	England	M&S Bank Arena	—N/a	—N/a
December 6, 2019	Nottingham	England	Motorpoint Arena Nottingham	—N/a	—N/a
December 7, 2019	Nottingham	England	Motorpoint Arena Nottingham	—N/a	—N/a
December 9, 2019	London	England	The O_{2} Arena	—N/a	—N/a
December 10, 2019	London	England	The O_{2} Arena	—N/a	—N/a

List of 2020 concerts
Date	City	Country	Venue
February 1, 2020	Napier	New Zealand	Mission Estate Winery
February 4, 2020	Brisbane	Australia	Brisbane Entertainment Centre
February 5, 2020	Brisbane	Australia	Brisbane Entertainment Centre
February 7, 2020	Sydney	Australia	Qudos Bank Arena
February 8, 2020	Sydney	Australia	Qudos Bank Arena
February 12, 2020	Adelaide	Australia	Adelaide Entertainment Centre
February 13, 2020	Adelaide	Australia	Adelaide Entertainment Centre
February 15, 2020	Melbourne	Australia	Rod Laver Arena
February 16, 2020	Melbourne	Australia	Rod Laver Arena
February 18, 2020	Melbourne	Australia	Rod Laver Arena
February 21, 2020	Perth	Australia	RAC Arena
February 22, 2020	Perth	Australia	RAC Arena

List of 2021 concerts (Note: The shows in North America from February to March 2021 were originally scheduled to take place from March to May 2020 and then from February to March 2021, but were rescheduled due to the COVID-19 pandemic.)
Date	City	Country	Venue
September 9, 2021	Allentown	United States	PPL Center
September 11, 2021	Louisville	United States	KFC Yum! Center
September 13, 2021	Grand Rapids	United States	Van Andel Arena
September 14, 2021	Milwaukee	United States	Fiserv Forum
September 16, 2021	Moline	United States	TaxSlayer Center
September 17, 2021	Des Moines	United States	Wells Fargo Arena
September 19, 2021	Oklahoma City	United States	Paycom Center
September 21, 2021	Fort Worth	United States	Dickies Arena
September 24, 2021	Las Vegas	United States	T-Mobile Arena
September 25, 2021	Anaheim	United States	Honda Center
September 28, 2021	Fresno	United States	Save Mart Center
September 29, 2021	San Francisco	United States	Chase Center
October 1, 2021	Salt Lake City	United States	Vivint Arena
October 15, 2021	Uniondale	United States	Nassau Coliseum
October 16, 2021	Atlantic City	United States	Boardwalk Hall
October 18, 2021	Boston	United States	TD Garden
October 19, 2021	Albany	United States	Times Union Center
October 21, 2021	Cleveland	United States	Rocket Mortgage FieldHouse
October 22, 2021	Cincinnati	United States	Heritage Bank Center
October 24, 2021	Charlotte	United States	Spectrum Center
October 26, 2021	Raleigh	United States	PNC Arena
October 27, 2021	Greenville	United States	Bon Secours Wellness Arena
October 28, 2021	Jacksonville	United States	VyStar Veterans Memorial Arena

List of 2022 concerts (Note: These shows in the UK in July 2021 were originally scheduled to take place from July to August 2020 and then July 2021, but were rescheduled due to the COVID-19 pandemic.)
Date	City	Country	Venue
June 25, 2022 (Note: This concert is a part of Cadena 100 30 Aniversario 2022.)	Madrid	Spain	Estadio Wanda Metropolitano
July 2, 2022	Aylesbury	England	Waddesdon Manor
July 4, 2022	Kelso	Scotland	Floors Castle
July 6, 2022	County Durham	England	Emirates Riverside
July 8, 2022	Leeds	England	Harewood House
July 9, 2022	Derby	England	Incora County Ground
July 11, 2022	Norwich	England	Blickling Estate
July 13, 2022	Warwick	England	Warwick Castle
July 15, 2022	Bath	England	Bath Royal Crescent
July 16, 2022	Bath	England	Bath Royal Crescent
July 18, 2022	New Milton	England	Chewton Glen
July 20, 2022	Cardiff	Wales	Cardiff Castle
July 21, 2022	Hove	England	The 1st Central County Ground
July 23, 2022	Hatfield	England	Hatfield House
July 24, 2022	Canterbury	England	The Spitfire Ground
July 25, 2022	Exeter	England	Powderham Castle

=== Cancelled shows ===
List of cancelled concerts (Note: These shows in Mexico in October 2021 were originally scheduled to take place in April 2020 and then November 2020, but were rescheduled due to the COVID-19 pandemic.)
Date	City	Country	Venue	Reason
March 18, 2021	Indianapolis	United States	Bankers Life Fieldhouse	Scheduling conflicts
September 20, 2021	Austin	United States	Frank Erwin Center	Conflicts regarding COVID protocols
November 3, 2021	Porto Alegre	Brazil	Arena do Grêmio	
November 9, 2021	Monterrey	Mexico	Arena Monterrey	COVID-19 pandemic
November 11, 2021	Mexico City	Mexico	Mexico City Arena	COVID-19 pandemic
November 12, 2021	Mexico City	Mexico	Mexico City Arena	COVID-19 pandemic
November 13, 2021	Mexico City	Mexico	Mexico City Arena	COVID-19 pandemic
