= Christmas (Michael Bublé album) =

- Standard artwork. Deluxe Special Edition artwork uses grey text instead of red and the words "deluxe special edition", also in grey, are placed below the album title.

Studio album by Michael Bublé
- Released: October 21, 2011
- Recorded: February, Late June–Early August 2011
- Studios: Warehouse Studios, Vancouver; Capitol Studios, Hollywood
- Genres: Christmas; Dixieland; swing; traditional pop; easy listening; jazz
- Length: 51:44
- Labels: 143; Reprise
- Producers: David Foster; Bob Rock; Humberto Gatica

Michael Bublé chronology
Crazy Love (2009)	Christmas (2011)	To Be Loved (2013)

Singles from Christmas
- 1. "All I Want for Christmas Is You" Released: November 16, 2011; 2. "Christmas (Baby Please Come Home)" Released: December 9, 2011; 3. "It's Beginning to Look a Lot Like Christmas / Jingle Bells" Released: November 18, 2012; 4. "White Christmas (featuring Shania Twain)" Released: December 11, 2012; 5. "Cold December Night" Released: December 21, 2012

Christmas is the seventh studio album and first Christmas album released by Canadian singer Michael Bublé. The album was released on October 21, 2011, in Ireland, on October 24, 2011, in the United Kingdom, and on October 25, 2011, in the United States. Receiving generally positive reviews from critics, Christmas is Bublé's most successful album with more than 16 million copies sold worldwide (as of January 2022), including some six million sales in America alone, making it one of the best-selling albums of the 21st century and one of the best-selling Christmas albums worldwide.

On the week ending December 10, 2011, Christmas rose to No. 1 on the Billboard 200 album sales chart, becoming Bublé's third chart-topper following 2007's Call Me Irresponsible and 2009's Crazy Love, and spent five weeks at No. 1. Over the years, the album has reached number one in twenty international charts, including Australia, Germany, Italy and United Kingdom. The album also won a Juno Award for Album of the Year, making it the first holiday album to win the award.

The album was re-released on November 26, 2012, containing four additional tracks, including a new recording of "The Christmas Song". Bublé also released a reworked version of "White Christmas", this time featuring Shania Twain, as a single. This version premiered on Bublé's NBC television special, Home for the Holidays, on December 10, 2012.

== Background ==
The album is Bublé's second Christmas-themed release after he released a five-track extended play, titled Let It Snow in 2003. Some of the songs from Let It Snow have been re-recorded for inclusion on Christmas, making Christmas his first full-length holiday release. For the album, Bublé teamed up with several well-known artists to record duets. His duet version of "White Christmas" with country music singer Shania Twain was based on an early arrangement by The Drifters, while his recording of "Jingle Bells" with the Puppini Sisters was based on the 1943 recording of Bing Crosby and the Andrews Sisters. He also teamed up with Latin star Thalía for a recording of "Feliz Navidad". Bublé also recorded covers of Mariah Carey's "All I Want for Christmas Is You", and "Blue Christmas", and a brand new track, "Cold December Night", written with his longtime co-writer Alan Chang and producer Bob Rock.

== Promotion ==
The album's track listing was unveiled by Bublé on September 27, 2011. Bublé filmed several music videos in order to promote the album, including videos for the tracks "Santa Claus Is Coming to Town", the lead single "All I Want for Christmas Is You", "Holly Jolly Christmas", "Christmas (Baby Please Come Home)", "Have Yourself a Merry Little Christmas", and "Jingle Bells". Bublé also appeared to perform during the final of the eighth series of The X Factor in the United Kingdom on December 11, 2011. Bublé's recording of "All I Want for Christmas Is You" was also featured in a montage on ABC-TV's General Hospital that aired on December 23, 2011.

=== Specials ===
On December 6, 2011, Bublé promoted the album in the United States with the broadcast of an NBC television special, A Michael Bublé Christmas, a show produced by Ben Silverman. The special was viewed by more than 7.07 million viewers, receiving a 1.5 rating and 4% share among adults between the ages of 18 and 49. In Canada, the special was viewed by 1.533 million viewers, ranking the seventeenth most watched programme overall for the week. Zap2it reviewed the special, and claimed it to be "one of the year's television guilty pleasures". On December 18, 2011, Bublé promoted the album in the United Kingdom with the broadcast of an ITV1 television special, Michael Bublé: Home for Christmas. The special featured guest appearances from comedian Dawn French, duet performances with both Kelly Rowland and Gary Barlow, and a cooking tutorial with Gino D'Acampo. The special pulled in 5.7 million viewers, and was the third most-watched ITV Christmas special of the season.

Bublé later announced that he was to film another NBC special, titled Michael Bublé: Home for the Holidays, featuring guest appearances from Rod Stewart, Blake Shelton, and Carly Rae Jepsen. The special aired on December 10, 2012; and was watched by 5.66 million American viewers, receiving a 1.4/4 18-49 rating/share.

On October 18, 2013, it was announced that Bublé would feature in a third Christmas special on December 18, 2013, via NBC. Guest stars featuring in the special included Mariah Carey, Mary J. Blige and Cookie Monster.

== Reception ==
Professional ratings
Review scores
Source	Rating
AllMusic	3.5/5 stars
Rockstar Weekly	4.5/5 stars

Christmas received generally positive reviews from critics. Mike Diver of BBC News, although he found the album "a predictable programme", prised that Bublé "does the classics to an accomplished standard and everything is professionally packaged" and described the vocals "smooth and steady, his lines wrap around these familiar pieces like fine ribbon around a promisingly shaped gift".

Sal Cinquemani, on his list of "The 21 Best Christmas Albums of the 21st Century" for Billboard, ranked the album as the 20th, writing that the album "become one of his generation’s most popular holiday crooners".Entertainment Weekly ranked the album 18th on its list of the "Best Christmas Albums of all Time", writing that the album express "Bublé at his best" because he "recall singers from another time while establishing him as one of the present pinnacles of the holiday".

=== Controversy ===
Years after the album's release, Bublé has been widely criticized for his choice to change the pronouns of love interests in songs written about men so as to reinforce his heterosexual identity, most notably in his cover of “Santa Baby”, which one critic calls “particularly irritating…because he changes the lyrics to make sure everyone knows he is not attracted to Santa. [This] just leads to unbelievably awkward phrases like ‘Santa buddy,’ ‘Santa pally,’ and the truly awful ‘I'll wait up for you, dude.’”

== Commercial performance ==
On November 5, 2011, Christmas debuted at No. 3 on the Billboard 200 charts in the United States, with first-week sales of 141,000 copies, according to Nielsen SoundScan. In its fifth week on the chart, the album climbed to No. 1, and held the top spot for the following four weeks, becoming Bublé's biggest selling chart-topper yet by beating the two-week reign of his previous album, Crazy Love. Christmas also sold 479,000 copies in the album's third week at No. 1, which marked Bublé's best sales week ever. On the album's tenth week on the album charts, and with Christmas having passed, the album fell to No. 24 on January 14, 2012. As of January 2017 it shares the sixth-largest drop from #1 with Blue Slide Park by Mac Miller.

For the year, Christmas sold 2,452,000 copies in the United States, according to SoundScan, and was the second best-selling album of the year, just behind Adele's blockbuster album 21. In 2012, Christmas sold an additional 622,000 copies in the U.S. according to SoundScan, and was the second best-selling holiday album of the year (behind Rod Stewart's Merry Christmas, Baby). By December 4, 2017, the album had sold 4,129,000 copies in the United States, making it his best selling album in the country. As of December 2022, the album had sold 4,500,000 copies in United States.

In Canada, the album debuted at No. 2 on the Canadian Albums Chart, selling 37,000 copies in its first week. In its third week of release, the album climbed to No. 1, selling an additional 32,000 copies. As of December 14, 2011, the album has sold 444,000 copies in Canada.

Christmas also debuted at number 2 in Australia on October 31, 2011. The album has since been certified double Diamond by the Australian Recording Industry Association (ARIA) for shipments of over 910,000 copies. It hit number 1 in December 2011, 2012, 2013 and 2014. It reached number 2 in 2015, being held off from the top spot by Adele's 25. In 2016, the album peaked at number 2 in December, then hit number 1 for the fifth time in the week of January 2, 2017. During the Christmas season of 2017, it peaked at number 4 in early December. In December 2019, it hit number 1 in Australia for the sixth time, becoming the first album to top the ARIA albums chart at six separate times in different years. Christmas was listed as the second best selling album of the 2010s in Australia.

Despite competition from Snow Patrol's album Fallen Empires, Christmas peaked at No. 1 on the UK Albums Chart. It sold 1,292,000 copies in the UK in 2011, making it the second best-selling album of 2011. It is the first seasonal album to chart within the top 10 three years in a row, as it charted at number one in 2011, at number two in 2012, and at number seven in 2013. As of December 2021, the album is the best-selling holiday album in the UK, selling over 3 million copies. The album returned to No. 1 for a fourth non-consecutive week on 1 January 2021, nine years after its initial three-week run at the top in 2011 and became the first album to disappear from the No. 1 spot on the UK albums chart on 8 January 2021 (previously The Vamps had achieved the record for biggest drop from number one, when their album fell from the top to No.72 in November 2020).

== Track listing ==
Information is based on the album's liner notes.

Standard edition
No.	Title	Writer(s)	Producer(s)	Length
1.	"It's Beginning to Look a Lot Like Christmas"	Meredith Willson	David Foster	3:26
2.	"Santa Claus Is Comin' to Town"	J. Fred Coots; Haven Gillespie	Foster	2:51
3.	"Jingle Bells" (featuring the Puppini Sisters)	Traditional	Foster	2:39
4.	"White Christmas" (duet with Shania Twain)	Irving Berlin	Foster	3:36
5.	"All I Want for Christmas Is You"	Mariah Carey; Walter Afanasieff	Bob Rock	2:51
6.	"A Holly Jolly Christmas"	John Marks	Foster	1:59
7.	"Santa Baby"	Joan Javits; Tony Springer; Philip Springer	Humberto Gatica	3:51
8.	"Have Yourself a Merry Little Christmas"	Ralph Blane; Hugh Martin	Rock	3:50
9.	"Christmas (Baby Please Come Home)"	Jeff Barry; Ellie Greenwich; Phil Spector	Rock	3:07
10.	"Silent Night"	Traditional	Foster	3:47
11.	"Blue Christmas"	Billy Hayes; Jay Johnson	Rock	3:41
12.	"Cold December Night"	Michael Bublé; Alan Chang; Bob Rock	Rock	3:18
13.	"I'll Be Home for Christmas"	Kim Gannon; Walter Kent; Buck Ram	Foster	4:24
14.	"Ave Maria"	Traditional	Foster	4:00
15.	"Mis Deseos/Feliz Navidad" (duet with Thalía)	Bublé; Humberto Gatica; Chang; Claudia Brant; José Feliciano	Gatica	4:24
16.	"Michael's Christmas Greeting" (hidden track)	Bublé		0:05
Total length:				51:44

Deluxe edition bonus tracks
No.	Title	Writer(s)	Producer(s)	Length
17.	"Winter Wonderland"	Felix Bernard; Richard B. Smith	Foster	2:29
18.	"Frosty the Snowman" (featuring the Puppini Sisters)	Steve Nelson; Jack Rollins	Foster	2:40
19.	"Silver Bells" (featuring Naturally 7)	Ray Evans; Jay Livingston	Foster	3:06
Total length:				59:59

Deluxe edition bonus DVD
No.	Title	Length
1.	"The Making of 'Christmas'"	30:00

2012 deluxe special edition additional tracks
No.	Title	Writer(s)	Producer(s)	Length
16.	"The Christmas Song (Chestnuts Roasting on an Open Fire)"	Mel Tormé; Robert Wells	Foster	4:14
17.	"Winter Wonderland"	Bernard; Smith	Foster	2:29
18.	"Frosty the Snowman" (featuring the Puppini Sisters)	Nelson; Rollins	Foster	2:40
19.	"Silver Bells" (featuring Naturally 7)	Evans; Livingston	Foster	3:06
Total length:				64:13

2019 deluxe special edition additional track
No.	Title	Writer(s)	Length
20.	"White Christmas"	Berlin	3:24
Total length:			67:37

2021 10th anniversary deluxe edition bonus disc
No.	Title	Writer(s)	Producer(s)	Length
1.	"Let It Snow!" (10th anniversary)	Jule Styne; Sammy Cahn	Jason "Spicy G" Goldman	2:40
2.	"Winter Wonderland" (featuring Rod Stewart)	Bernard; Smith	Foster	2:35
3.	"The Christmas Sweater"	Lorne Balfe; Gary Barlow; Bublé; Jane Goldman; Matthew Vaughn	Johan Carlsson	3:45
4.	"Frosty the Snowman" (featuring the Puppini Sisters)	Nelson; Rollins	Foster	2:42
5.	"Silver Bells" (featuring Naturally 7)	Evans; Livingston	Foster	3:09
6.	"The More You Give (The More You'll Have)"	Bublé; Kathryn D. Raio; JP Rende; Melissa Utini	Rock	3:12
7.	"White Christmas"	Berlin		3:24

Notes

- The Subliminal 9 are Caco Cocci, Steve Hartley, Paul Kirzner, Carsten Love, Lanny McVeigh, Derek Nyrose, Brad Openshaw, Ron Toigo and Rob Ubles.

== Personnel ==
Information is based on the album's liner notes.

- Michael Bublé – lead vocals (1–15); musical arrangement (4)
- Janet Adderley – children's choir director (10)
- Rusty Anderson – additional guitar (12)
- Christopher Bazzoli – string section conductor, horn section conductor (5)
- Chuck Berghofer – bass guitar (1–4, 6, 13)
- Jon Brion – string arrangement, horn arrangement (5)
- Alan Broadbent – orchestral arrangement (1, 13)
- Bob Buckley – orchestra conductor (8)
- Paul Bushnell – bass guitar (9, 11–12)
- Clayton Cameron – drums (8)
- Alan Chang – piano (5, 7, 9, 11–12, 15); musical arrangement, celeste (8, 12); glockenspiel, string arrangements (12)
- Judy Chilnick – percussion (7)
- Vinnie Colaiuta – drums (3, 15)
- Brad Dechter – musical arrangement, orchestra conductor (7); orchestration (14); string arrangement (15)
- Graham Dechter – guitar (1–4, 6–8, 13)
- Nathan East – bass guitar (15)
- Peter Erskine – drums (1, 13)
- Alan Estes – percussion (9, 11, 15)
- Greg Fields – drums (2, 4, 6)
- David Foster – orchestral arrangement (1, 13), musical arrangement (1, 3–4, 6, 10, 13–14), keyboards (1–4, 6, 10, 13–14)
- Josh Freese – drums (9, 12)
- Humberto Gatica – rhythm arrangement, vocal arrangement (15)
- Wataru Hokoyama – string section conductor, horn section conductor (12)
- Kevin Kanner – drums (7)
- Jim Keltner – drums (5, 11)
- Gayle Levant – harp (10, 14)
- Kenny O'Brien – harmony arrangement (15)
- Dean Parks – guitar (7, 15), acoustic guitar (10)
- Alan Pasqua – piano (1–4, 6–7, 13)
- Dave Pierce – musical arrangement (9, 11); orchestra conductor (9, 11–12); string arrangement, horn arrangement (12)
- Craig Polasko – bass guitar (5, 8, 11); musical arrangement, synth strings, additional drums (5)
- The Puppini Sisters – background vocals (3)
- Bill Ross – orchestration (10)
- Jochem van der Saag – synthesizer, synthesizer programming, recording engineer, audio mixing (1–4, 6, 10, 13–14)
- Keith Scott – guitar (5, 9, 11–12)
- Don Sebesky – orchestration (4)
- Sally Stevens – choir director (14)
- The Subliminal 9 – additional background vocals (9)
- Thalía – lead vocals (15)
- Shania Twain – lead vocals (4)
- Michael Valerio – bass guitar (7)
- Chris Walden – musical arrangement (17, 18), orchestration (3)
- Pat Williams – musical arrangement (2)
- Lyle Workman – guitar (5, 9, 11–12)

Production

- David Foster – producer (1–4, 6, 10, 13–14)
- Bob Rock – producer (5, 8–9, 11–12); audio mixing (11)
- Humberto Gatica – producer, recording engineer, audio mixing (7, 15)
- Al Schmitt – recording engineer (1–4, 6, 10, 13–14), audio mixing (8)
- Nicholas Essig – assistant recording engineer (5, 8–9, 11–12)
- Steve Genewick – assistant recording engineer (1–6, 8–14)
- Eric Helmkamp – recording engineer (5, 8–9, 11–12), audio mixing (11)
- Chris Lord-Alge – audio mixing (5, 9, 12)
- Eric Mosher – assistant recording engineer (5, 8–9, 11–12)
- Cristian Robles – recording engineer (7, 15)
- Paul Smith – assistant recording engineer (7, 15)
- Jorge Vivo – recording engineer (1–4, 6, 10, 13–14)
- Brian Warwick – additional recording engineer (12)

== Charts ==
=== Weekly charts ===
Weekly chart performance for Christmas
Chart (2011–2025)	Peak position
Australian Albums (ARIA)	1
Austrian Albums (Ö3 Austria)	1
Belgian Albums (Ultratop Flanders)	3
Belgian Albums (Ultratop Wallonia)	4
Canadian Albums (Billboard)	1
Croatian International Albums (HDU)	1
Czech Albums (ČNS IFPI)	3
Danish Albums (Hitlisten)	1
Dutch Albums (Album Top 100)	1
Estonian Albums (Albumid Tipp-40)	4
Finnish Albums (Suomen virallinen lista)	2
French Albums (SNEP)	29
German Albums (Offizielle Top 100)	1
German Pop Albums (Offizielle Top 100)	1
Hungarian Albums (MAHASZ)	1
Icelandic Albums (Tónlistinn)	1
Irish Albums (IRMA)	1
Italian Albums (FIMI)	1
Japan Hot Albums (Billboard Japan)	33
Latvian Albums (LAIPA)	2
Lithuanian Albums (AGATA)	2
Mexican Albums (Top 100 Mexico)	2
New Zealand Albums (RMNZ)	1
Norwegian Albums (VG-lista)	1
Polish Albums (ZPAV)	1
Portuguese Albums (AFP)	1
South African Albums (RiSA)	3
Spanish Albums (Promusicae)	8
Swedish Albums (Sverigetopplistan)	1
Swiss Albums (Schweizer Hitparade)	1
UK Albums (Official Charts)	1
US Billboard 200	1

=== Year-end charts ===
Year-end chart performance for Christmas
Chart (2011)	Position
Australian Albums (ARIA)	2
Austrian Albums (Ö3 Austria)	28
Belgian Albums (Ultratop Flanders)	68
Belgian Albums (Ultratop Wallonia)	82
Canadian Albums (Billboard)	16
Danish Albums (Hitlisten)	21
Dutch Albums (Album Top 100)	7
Finnish Albums (Suomen viralinen lista)	12
French Albums (SNEP)	84
German Albums (Offizielle Top 100)	8
Hungarian Albums (MAHASZ)	6
Irish Albums (IRMA)	2
Italian Albums (FIMI)	7
Mexican Albums (AMPROFON)	18
New Zealand Albums (RMNZ)	16
Polish Albums (ZPAV)	10
Spanish Albums (PROMUSICAE)	31
Swedish Albums (Sverigetopplistan)	9
Swiss Albums (Schweizer Hitparade)	43
UK Albums (OCC)	2
US Billboard 200	82
US Top Jazz Albums (Billboard)	2

Chart (2012)	Position
Australian Albums (ARIA)	4
Austrian Albums (Ö3 Austria)	18
Canadian Albums (Billboard)	2
Danish Albums (Hitlisten)	44
Dutch Albums (Album Top 100)	35
Finnish Albums	48
Hungarian Albums (MAHASZ)	3
Italian Albums (FIMI)	24
Swedish Albums (Sverigetopplistan)	85
Swiss Albums (Schweizer Hitparade)	27
UK Albums (OCC)	8
US Billboard 200	2
US Digital Albums (Billboard)	14
US Jazz Albums (Billboard)	1

Chart (2013)	Position
Australian Albums (ARIA)	7
Austrian Albums (Ö3 Austria)	28
Belgian Albums (Ultratop Flanders)	107
Belgian Albums (Ultratop Wallonia)	154
Hungarian Albums (MAHASZ)	40
Italian Albums (FIMI)	95
Polish Albums (ZPAV)	55
Swedish Albums (Sverigetopplistan)	35
Swiss Albums (Schweizer Hitparade)	71
UK Albums (OCC)	29
US Billboard 200	35

Chart (2014)	Position
Australian Albums (ARIA)	8
Austrian Albums (Ö3 Austria)	38
Dutch Albums (Album Top 100)	49
Italian Albums (FIMI)	53
New Zealand Albums (RMNZ)	15
Polish Albums Chart	44
Swiss Albums (Schweizer Hitparade)	66
UK Albums (OCC)	30
US Billboard 200	51

Chart (2015)	Position
Australian Albums (ARIA)	7
Dutch Albums (Album Top 100)	79
Hungarian Albums (MAHASZ)	83
Italian Albums (FIMI)	52
New Zealand Albums (RMNZ)	5
UK Albums (OCC)	40
US Billboard 200	77

Chart (2016)	Position
Australian Albums (ARIA)	5
Danish Albums (Hitlisten)	72
Dutch Albums (MegaCharts)	94
Icelandic Albums (Tónlistinn)	44
Italian Albums (FIMI)	75
New Zealand Albums (RMNZ)	5
UK Albums (OCC)	23
US Billboard 200	125

Chart (2017)	Position
Australian Albums (ARIA)	8
Canadian Albums (Billboard)	46
Danish Albums (Hitlisten)	49
Italian Albums (FIMI)	77
New Zealand Albums (RMNZ)	17
UK Albums (OCC)	24
US Billboard 200	146

Chart (2018)	Position
Australian Albums (ARIA)	30
Danish Albums (Hitlisten)	50
Icelandic Albums (Tónlistinn)	53
Polish Albums (ZPAV)	27
Portuguese Albums (AFP)	58
Swedish Albums (Sverigetopplistan)	96
Swiss Albums (Schweizer Hitparade)	84
UK Albums (OCC)	27
US Billboard 200	154

Chart (2019)	Position
Australian Albums (ARIA)	65
Austrian Albums (Ö3 Austria)	57
Canadian Albums (Billboard)	47
Danish Albums (Hitlisten)	52
Icelandic Albums (Tónlistinn)	56
Swiss Albums (Schweizer Hitparade)	80
UK Albums (OCC)	33
US Billboard 200	130

Chart (2020)	Position
Austrian Albums (Ö3 Austria)	63
Danish Albums (Hitlisten)	44
Dutch Albums (Album Top 100)	59
Icelandic Albums (Tónlistinn)	61
Italian Albums (FIMI)	52
Polish Albums (ZPAV)	80
Swiss Albums (Schweizer Hitparade)	82
UK Albums (OCC)	57
US Billboard 200	147

Chart (2021)	Position
Austrian Albums (Ö3 Austria)	23
Belgian Albums (Ultratop Flanders)	142
Canadian Albums (Billboard)	44
Danish Albums (Hitlisten)	33
Dutch Albums (Album Top 100)	47
German Albums (Offizielle Top 100)	66
Hungarian Albums (MAHASZ)	63
Icelandic Albums (Tónlistinn)	63
Italian Albums (FIMI)	56
Norwegian Albums (VG-lista)	31
Swiss Albums (Schweizer Hitparade)	44
UK Albums (OCC)	57
US Billboard 200	136

Chart (2022)	Position
Austrian Albums (Ö3 Austria)	44
Belgian Albums (Ultratop Flanders)	153
Canadian Albums (Billboard)	46
Danish Albums (Hitlisten)	42
Dutch Albums (Album Top 100)	46
German Albums (Offizielle Top 100)	71
Icelandic Albums (Tónlistinn)	82
Italian Albums (FIMI)	90
Polish Albums (ZPAV)	46
Swiss Albums (Schweizer Hitparade)	56
UK Albums (OCC)	83
US Billboard 200	133

Chart (2023)	Position
Austrian Albums (Ö3 Austria)	71
Danish Albums (Hitlisten)	43
Dutch Albums (Album Top 100)	53
German Albums (Offizielle Top 100)	76
Hungarian Albums (MAHASZ)	21
Icelandic Albums (Tónlistinn)	93
Italian Albums (FIMI)	84
Swiss Albums (Schweizer Hitparade)	76
UK Albums (OCC)	80
US Billboard 200	154

Chart (2024)	Position
Austrian Albums (Ö3 Austria)	24
Danish Albums (Hitlisten)	50
Dutch Albums (Album Top 100)	80
Hungarian Albums (MAHASZ)	63
Swiss Albums (Schweizer Hitparade)	38
US Billboard 200	159

Chart (2025)	Position
Austrian Albums (Ö3 Austria)	60
Dutch Albums (Album Top 100)	84
German Albums (Offizielle Top 100)	57
Hungarian Albums (MAHASZ)	71
Swiss Albums (Schweizer Hitparade)	33
US Billboard 200	156

=== Decade-end charts ===
Decade-end chart performance for Christmas
Chart (2010–2019)	Position
Australian Albums (ARIA)	2
German Albums (Offizielle Top 100)	19
UK Albums (OCC)	5
US Billboard 200	24

== Certifications and sales ==
Certifications and sales for Christmas
Region	Certification	Certified units/sales
Australia (ARIA)	2× Diamond	1,000,000^{‡}
Austria (IFPI Austria)	3× Platinum	60,000^{*}
Belgium (BRMA)	Gold	15,000^{*}
Canada (Music Canada)	Diamond	1,500,000
Denmark (IFPI Danmark)	7× Platinum	140,000^{‡}
Finland (Musiikkituottajat)	Platinum	35,217
France (SNEP)	Gold	50,000^{*}
Germany (BVMI)	9× Gold	900,000^{‡}
Hungary (MAHASZ)	2× Platinum	12,000^{^}
Iceland (FHF)	Gold	5,000
Ireland (IRMA)	8× Platinum	120,000^{^}
Italy (FIMI)	8× Platinum	400,000^{‡}
Mexico (AMPROFON)	Platinum	60,000^{^}
Netherlands (NVPI)	Platinum	50,000^{^}
New Zealand (RMNZ)	14× Platinum	210,000^{‡}
Norway (IFPI Norway)	6× Platinum	120,000^{‡}
Poland (ZPAV)	2× Platinum	40,000^{*}
Portugal (AFP)	Gold	7,500^{^}
Spain (Promusicae)	Gold	30,000^{^}
Sweden (GLF)	Platinum	40,000^{‡}
Switzerland (IFPI Switzerland)	Platinum	30,000^{^}
United Kingdom (BPI)	11× Platinum	3,300,000
United States (RIAA)	6× Platinum	6,000,000^{‡}
Summaries
Europe (IFPI)	3× Platinum	3,000,000^{*}
Worldwide	—	12,000,000
^{*} Sales figures based on certification alone.^{^} Shipments figures based on certification alone.^{‡} Sales+streaming figures based on certification alone.

== See also ==
- List of best-selling albums in Australia
- List of diamond-certified albums in Canada
- List of best-selling albums of the 21st century
- List of best-selling albums in the United States of the Nielsen SoundScan era
