= The More You Give (The More You'll Have) =

Single by Michael Bublé
- Released: 30 November 2015
- Recorded: 2015
- Genre: Holiday
- Length: 3:11
- Label: Reprise Records

Michael Buble singles chronology
"Baby, It's Cold Outside" (2014)	"The More You Give (The More You'll Have)" (2015)	"Nobody but Me" (2016)

Lyric video
- "Michael Bublé - The More You Give (The More You'll Have) [OFFICIAL LYRIC VIDEO]" on YouTube

"The More You Give (The More You'll Have)" is a song by Canadian recording artist Michael Bublé. The song was released as a digital download on 30 November 2015 by Reprise Records.

== Track listing ==
Digital download
No.	Title	Length
1.	"The More You Give (The More You'll Have)"	3:11

== Chart performance ==
Chart (2015)	Peak position
Australia (ARIA)	97
Hungary (Single Top 40)	32
US Adult Contemporary (Billboard)	19

== Release history ==
Region	Date	Format	Label
United States	30 November 2015	Digital download	Sony Music Entertainment
