= Forever Now (Michael Bublé song) =

2018 song by Michael Bublé

Single by Michael Bublé

from the album Love
- Released: March 1, 2019
- Genre: Pop
- Length: 3:40
- Label: Reprise
- Songwriter(s): Alan Chang; Michael Bublé; Ryan Lerman; Tom Jackson
- Producer(s): Michael Bublé; David Foster; Jochen Van der Saag

Michael Bublé singles chronology
"Love You Anymore" (2018)	"Forever Now" (2019)	"Gotta Be Patient" (2020)

Music video
- "Forever Now" on YouTube

"Forever Now" is a song by Canadian singer Michael Bublé. It was released on March 1, 2019, and is from Bublé's eighth studio album, Love (2018). The song reached No. 19 on US adult contemporary charts.

== Background ==
Bublé, inspired by how much he loves being a dad, wrote the song for his children. He said: "It's too much fun, I laugh all the time, it's the best thing that ever happened". "I've never written a more succinct song talking about what many of us feel we're brought to this earth to do. It was about time and sentimentality".

== Music video ==
The music video was released on March 1, 2019. The video shows a room in which a child can be seen growing from a newborn to an adult.

== Charts ==
=== Weekly charts ===
Chart (2019)	Peak position
US Adult Contemporary (Billboard)	19

=== Year-end charts ===
Chart (2019)	Position
US Adult Contemporary (Billboard)	49
