= Love You Anymore =

2018 song by Michael Bublé

Single by Michael Bublé

from the album Love
- Released: October 12, 2018
- Genre: Pop
- Length: 3:02
- Label: Reprise
- Songwriters: Ilsey Juber; Johan Carlsson; Charlie Puth; Scott Harris
- Producers: Michael Bublé; David Foster; Jochen Van der Saag

Michael Bublé singles chronology
"When I Fall in Love" (2018)	"Love You Anymore" (2018)	"Forever Now" (2019)

Music video
- "Love You Anymore" on YouTube

"Love You Anymore" is a song by the Canadian singer Michael Bublé, from his eighth studio album, Love. It was released on October 12, 2018.

== Background ==
"The moment I first heard 'Love You Anymore,' I knew right away that I had to record it and put it on my new record. I can't wait for my fans to hear it. In fact, I can't wait for them to hear the entire album because I'm really proud of what we’ve created this time out", Bublé said.

Due to his son Noah's recovery from cancer, Bublé was able to return to the studio to create the new record as a token of his gratitude to his fans.

== Charts ==
=== Weekly charts ===
Chart (2018–2019)	Peak position
Belgium (Ultratip Bubbling Under Flanders)	10
Belgium (Ultratip Bubbling Under Wallonia)	36
Canada AC (Billboard)	13
Canada Hot AC (Billboard)	45
Netherlands (Dutch Top 40 Tipparade)	3
US Adult Contemporary (Billboard)	10
US Adult Pop Airplay (Billboard)	27

=== Year-end charts ===
Chart (2019)	Position
US Adult Contemporary (Billboard)	28
