= Nobody but Me (Michael Bublé album) =

Studio album by Michael Bublé
- Released: October 21, 2016
- Recorded: September 8, 2015 – August 2016
- Studio: The Warehouse (Vancouver); Capitol (Hollywood); Henson Recording (Hollywood)
- Length: 34:38
- Label: Reprise
- Producer: Michael Bublé; Johan Carlsson; Alan Chang; Jason "Spicy G" Goldman; The Monsters and the Strangerz

Michael Bublé chronology
To Be Loved (2013)	Nobody but Me (2016)	Love (2018)

Singles from Nobody but Me
- 1. "Nobody but Me" Released: August 19, 2016; 2. "I Believe in You" Released: February 10, 2017

Nobody but Me is the ninth studio album by Canadian singer Michael Bublé. The album was released on October 21, 2016, by Reprise Records. It features three original songs co-written by Bublé, including the lead single "Nobody but Me", and nine cover versions.

== Background ==
Bublé said of the album, "I don't know that I've ever had this much fun working on an album. It was especially thrilling to collaborate with my band who understand that I want to sound better than I've ever sounded. I'm also very proud of the new songs. Having the opportunity to co-produce was a joy for me personally."

The album features "Someday", a duet with Meghan Trainor, which was written by Trainor and Harry Styles of British boy band One Direction. It marks the first time Bublé has recorded an original song not written by himself.

== Critical reception ==
Professional ratings
Review scores
Source	Rating
AllMusic	4/5 stars
Evening Standard	3/5 stars

Nobody but Me received mostly positive reviews from music critics. AllMusic's Matt Collar wrote: "not surprisingly, he keeps the dance going with his slick, superbly executed ninth studio album, 2016's Nobody but Me. Co-produced by Bublé along with a cadre of big-name pop producers including Johan Carlsson, Alan Chang, Jason "Spicy G" Goldman, and the Monsters & Strangerz, the album is not dissimilar from the Canadian artist's past works. Here, we get a handful of well-curated standards, from a jaunty reading of the Matt Monro classic "My Kind of Girl" to a lush, orchestral take on "The Very Thought of You" to a brightly swinging, Sinatra-esque version of "My Baby Just Cares for Me." And while it's Bublé's finely honed talent for delivering these urbane, time-tested songs that remains the foundation of his appeal, he continues to defy easy categorization with his various forays into newly penned, modern radio-ready pop. Cuts like the crisp, '50s rock-meets-2000s-hip-hop title track, the twangy and soulful "Today Is Yesterday's Tomorrow," and the ukulele-accented duet with Meghan Trainor "Someday," are peppy anthems that make the most of Bublé's charm. Ultimately, that Bublé can successfully transition on Nobody But Me from the uber-earnest acoustic guitar boy band romance of "I Believe in You" to the giddy, mandolin-soaked, Dean Martin-pastiche of "On an Evening in Roma (Sotter Celo de Roma)" and make both work is at the least an enviable skill and at best, a kind of pop magic. Very few of his contemporaries can do that and nobody but Bublé can own it like he does here.

== Commercial performance ==
In Canada, Nobody but Me debuted at number three on the Canadian Albums Chart with 15,300 album-equivalent units. It is Bublé's sixth top three debut in the country. The following week, it ascended to number two. On December 7, 2016, Nobody but Me was certified Platinum by Music Canada for shipments of 80,000 copies in the country.

In the United States, Nobody but Me debuted at number 2 on the Billboard 200 with 91,000 units, 85,000 of which were pure album sales. The album sales dropped by 73% to 25,000 units in the second week; consequently it fell to number 10 on the Billboard 200.

In the United Kingdom, Nobody but Me debuted at number 2 on the UK Albums Chart with 55,087 sales. In its second week Nobody but Me dropped to number three with 25,350 sales. With his three-year-old son diagnosed with cancer, Bublé benefited from a boost to his sales given by his primetime special, Bublé at the BBC. On January 9, 2017, the album was certified Platinum by the British Phonographic Industry (BPI) for shipping 300,000 units in the country. According to the International Federation of the Phonographic Industry (IFPI), Nobody but Me was the 12th best-selling album of 2016, selling 1.2 million copies that year.

== Track listing ==
Nobody but Me – Standard version
No.	Title	Writer(s)	Producer(s)	Length
1.	"I Believe in You"	Calle Ask; David Larsson; Filip Bekic; Frans Ohlsson; Robert Nilsson; Michael Bublé; Alan Chang; Ryan Lerman; Tom Jackson	Bublé; Chang; Johan Carlsson	3:21
2.	"My Kind of Girl"	Leslie Bricusse	Bublé; Chang; Spicy G	4:06
3.	"Nobody but Me" (featuring Black Thought)	Bublé; Chang; Bryan Lipps; Erik Kertes; Jason "Spicy G" Goldman	Bublé; Chang; Spicy G; Carlsson	2:59
4.	"On an Evening in Roma (Sotto er cielo de Roma)"	Nan Fredricks; Sandro Taccani; Umberto Bertini	Bublé; Chang	2:42
5.	"Today Is Yesterday's Tomorrow"	Ross Golan	Carlsson	3:24
6.	"The Very Thought of You"	Ray Noble	Bublé; Chang	3:31
7.	"I Wanna Be Around"	Johnny Mercer; Sadie Vimmerstedt	Bublé; Chang; Spicy G	3:42
8.	"Someday" (featuring Meghan Trainor)	Meghan Trainor; Harry Styles	Carlsson; The Monsters & Strangerz	3:23
9.	"My Baby Just Cares for Me"	Gus Kahn; Walter Donaldson	Bublé; Chang; Spicy G	3:15
10.	"God Only Knows"	Brian Wilson; Tony Asher	Bublé; Chang; Spicy G	4:15
Total length:				34:38

Nobody but Me – Deluxe version (bonus tracks)
No.	Title	Writer(s)	Producer(s)	Length
10.	"This Love of Mine"	Frank Sinatra; Hank Sanicola; Sol Parker	Bublé; Chang	4:20
11.	"Nobody but Me" (alternate version)	Bublé; Chang; Lipps; Kertes; Goldman	Bublé; Chang; Spicy G; Carlsson	3:01
12.	"Take You Away"	Bublé; Chang; Goldman; Kertes	Bublé; Chang; Spicy G	2:53
13.	"God Only Knows"	Wilson; Asher		4:15
Total length:				44:52

Nobody but Me – HSN version (bonus disc: At Home with Michael Bublé)
No.	Title	Writer(s)	Producer(s)	Length
1.	"Home"	Bublé; Chang; Amy Foster-Gillies	Bob Rock
2.	"Close Your Eyes"	Bublé; Chang; Jann Arden Richards	Rock
3.	"Have I Told You Lately That I Love You"	Scotty Wiseman	Rock
4.	"Crazy Love"	Van Morrison	Rock
5.	"You Make Me Feel So Young"	Mack Gordon; Josef Myrow	Rock

== Charts ==
=== Weekly charts ===
Chart (2016)	Peak position
Argentine Albums (CAPIF)	7
Australian Albums (ARIA)	2
Austrian Albums (Ö3 Austria)	3
Belgian Albums (Ultratop Flanders)	7
Belgian Albums (Ultratop Wallonia)	13
Canadian Albums (Billboard)	2
Croatian International Albums (HDU)ERROR in "Croatia": Missing parameters: id.	2
Czech Albums (ČNS IFPI)	14
Danish Albums (Hitlisten)	20
Dutch Albums (MegaCharts)	4
French Albums (SNEP)	25
Finnish Albums (Suomen virallinen lista)	32
German Albums (Offizielle Top 100)	4
Greek Albums (IFPI)	8
Hungarian Albums (MAHASZ)	1
Irish Albums (IRMA)	2
Italian Albums (FIMI)	6
Japanese Albums (Oricon)	41
Japanese International Albums (Oricon)	10
New Zealand Albums (RMNZ)	3
Norwegian Albums (VG-lista)	20
Polish Albums (ZPAV)	9
Portuguese Albums (AFP)	7
Scottish Albums (OCC)	1
Slovak Albums (ČNS IFPI)	7
Spanish Albums (PROMUSICAE)	6
Swedish Albums (Sverigetopplistan)	16
Swiss Albums (Schweizer Hitparade)	5
UK Albums (OCC)	2
US Billboard 200	2

=== Year-end charts ===
Chart (2016)	Position
Australian Albums (ARIA)	28
Austrian Albums (Ö3 Austria)	65
Belgian Albums (Ultratop Flanders)	58
Belgian Albums (Ultratop Wallonia)	105
Dutch Albums (MegaCharts)	99
German Albums (Offizielle Top 100)	80
New Zealand Albums (RMNZ)	36
Spanish Albums (PROMUSICAE)	79
UK Albums (OCC)	13

== Certifications and sales ==
Region	Certification	Certified units/sales
Australia (ARIA)	Gold	35,000^{^}
Canada (Music Canada)	Platinum	80,000^{‡}
Hungary (MAHASZ)	Platinum	2,000^{^}
New Zealand (RMNZ)	Gold	7,500^{‡}
Poland (ZPAV)	Gold	10,000^{‡}
United Kingdom (BPI)	Platinum	300,000^{‡}
United States	—	85,000
Summaries
Worldwide (IFPI)	—N/a	1,200,000
^{^} Shipments figures based on certification alone.^{‡} Sales+streaming figures based on certification alone.
