= Love (Michael Bublé album) =

Studio album by Michael Bublé
- Released: November 16, 2018
- Studios: Chartmaker, Malibu; Capitol, Hollywood; The Warehouse, Vancouver; EastWest, Hollywood; The Village Recorder, Los Angeles; Abbey Road, London; Angel, London
- Length: 38:23
- Languages: English; French
- Label: Reprise
- Producer: David Foster

Michael Bublé chronology
Nobody but Me (2016)	Love (2018)	Higher (2022)

Singles from Love
- 1. "When I Fall in Love" Released: September 27, 2018; 2. "Love You Anymore" Released: October 12, 2018

Love (stylized as the red heart emoji ❤️) is the tenth studio album by Canadian singer Michael Bublé. It was released on November 16, 2018, by Reprise Records. It is supported by the lead single "When I Fall in Love".

== Background and writing ==
Love is Bublé's first release of any kind in two years, following his eldest son Noah being diagnosed with liver cancer, which he has said made him consider "never returning to music". He later returned to write and record songs in the studio as his son's condition improved. On his approach to the album, Bublé stated: "My end game for the new record was to create a series of short cinematic stories for each song I chose and have it stand on its own." Once the rough outline of his album concept was formed he pitched the idea to his band members while they were visiting his Vancouver home for a casual jam session and video games.

For the album, Bublé wrote the original song "Forever Now" and co-wrote the track "Love You Anymore" with Charlie Puth. The singer coaxed his mentor David Foster out of retirement from studio projects to oversee development of much of the album. Bublé originally thought he would title the album My Romance in reference to his rekindled romance with music, but he decided against it because he felt the title would involve frequent contextual explanation.

== Promotion ==
Bublé announced the album in a Facebook Live stream, where he acknowledged the time he had spent away from music. The album was also called his "most romantic record to date". He performed a section of "Love You Anymore" on Carpool Karaoke for Stand Up to Cancer on October 26, 2018. He performed on The Graham Norton Show on November 9 and The X Factor on November 11.

=== Singles ===
The first single from the album, "When I Fall in Love", was released on September 27, 2018. It was followed by the original song, "Love You Anymore", on October 12, and finally "Such a Night" on November 9, one week before the album's release.

== Commercial performance ==
In Canada, Love debuted at number 2 on the Canadian Albums Chart with 26,000 album-equivalent units. It is Bublé's seventh top-two debut in the country. In his second week, Love reached number one on the chart, with 21,000 equivalent units. On January 2, 2019, Love was certified Platinum by Music Canada for shipments of 80,000 copies in the country.

In the United States, Love debuted at number 2 on the Billboard 200 with 111,000 units, 105,000 of which were pure album sales. It became Bublé's eighth top-10 album and sixth top-2 on the Billboard 200.

In the United Kingdom, Love debuted at number one with sales of 66,794 (88% of the sales being physical CDs), making it Bublé's fourth chart-topping record on the UK Albums Chart.

== Track listing ==
No.	Title	Writer(s)	Producer(s)	Length
1.	"When I Fall in Love"	Edward Heyman; Victor Young	Michael Bublé; David Foster; Jochen Van der Saag	4:03
2.	"I Only Have Eyes for You"	Al Dubin; Harry Warren	Bublé; Foster; Saag	3:22
3.	"Love You Anymore"	Ilsey Juber; Johan Carlsson; Charlie Puth; Scott Harris	Bublé; Foster; Saag	3:02
4.	"La vie en rose" (featuring Cécile McLorin Salvant)	Louiguy; Marguerite Monnot; Édith Piaf	Bublé; Foster; Saag	3:49
5.	"My Funny Valentine"	Lorenz Hart; Richard Rodgers	Bublé; Foster; Saag	4:25
6.	"Such a Night"	Lincoln Chase	Bublé; Foster; Saag	3:17
7.	"Forever Now"	Alan Chang; Michael Bublé; Ryan Lerman; Tom Jackson	Bublé; Foster; Saag	3:40
8.	"Help Me Make It Through the Night" (featuring Loren Allred)	Kris Kristofferson	Bublé; Foster; Saag	3:42
9.	"Unforgettable"	Irving Gordon	Bublé; Foster; Saag	3:08
10.	"When You're Smiling"	Joe Goodwin; Larry Shay; Mark Fisher	Bublé; Foster; Saag	2:50
11.	"Where or When"	Lorenz Hart; Richard Rodgers		3:05
Total length:				38:23

Deluxe edition bonus tracks& Japanese edition bonus tracks
No.	Title	Writer(s)	Producer(s)	Length
12.	"When You're Not Here"	Alfredo Le Pera; Carlos Gardel Rolando Lattes; Mario Battistella; Michael Bublé; Sebastian Schon	Bublé; Alan Chang; Jason "Spicy G" Goldman	3:38
13.	"I Get a Kick Out of You"	Cole Porter	Bublé; Foster; Saag	2:57
Total length:				44:58

== Charts ==
=== Weekly charts ===
Chart (2018–2021)	Peak position
Australian Albums (ARIA)	2
Austrian Albums (Ö3 Austria)	2
Belgian Albums (Ultratop Flanders)	3
Belgian Albums (Ultratop Wallonia)	13
Canadian Albums (Billboard)	1
Croatian International Albums (HDU)	1
Czech Albums (ČNS IFPI)	22
Danish Albums (Hitlisten)	20
Dutch Albums (Album Top 100)	4
Estonian Albums (Eesti Ekspress)	28
Finnish Albums (Suomen virallinen lista)	15
French Albums (SNEP)	60
German Albums (Offizielle Top 100)	6
Hungarian Albums (MAHASZ)	3
Irish Albums (IRMA)	4
Italian Albums (FIMI)	5
Japanese Albums (Oricon)	77
Japan Hot Albums (Billboard Japan)	92
New Zealand Albums (RMNZ)	2
Norwegian Albums (VG-lista)	31
Polish Albums (ZPAV)	1
Portuguese Albums (AFP)	2
Scottish Albums (Official Charts)	1
Slovak Albums (ČNS IFPI)	17
Spanish Albums (Promusicae)	5
Swedish Albums (Sverigetopplistan)	27
Swiss Albums (Schweizer Hitparade)	3
Taiwanese Albums (Five Music)	8
UK Albums (Official Charts)	1
US Billboard 200	2
US Top Jazz Albums (Billboard)	1

=== Year-end charts ===
Chart (2018)	Position
Australian Albums (ARIA)	44
Austrian Albums (Ö3 Austria)	35
Belgian Albums (Ultratop Flanders)	76
Belgian Albums (Ultratop Wallonia)	152
Dutch Albums (MegaCharts)	81
German Albums (Offizielle Top 100)	89
Irish Albums (IRMA)	30
Italian Albums (FIMI)	71
Spanish Albums (PROMUSICAE)	29
Swiss Albums (Schweizer Hitparade)	83
UK Albums (OCC)	8

Chart (2019)	Position
Belgian Albums (Ultratop Flanders)	108
Canadian Albums (Billboard)	16
Spanish Albums (PROMUSICAE)	49
US Billboard 200	128
US Top Jazz Albums (Billboard)	1

Chart (2020)	Position
US Top Jazz Albums (Billboard)	14

Chart (2021)	Position
Polish Albums (ZPAV)	94

Chart (2022)	Position
Polish Albums (ZPAV)	94

== Certifications ==
Region	Certification	Certified units/sales
Austria (IFPI Austria)	Gold	7,500^{‡}
Canada (Music Canada)	Platinum	80,000^{‡}
Hungary (MAHASZ)	Gold	2,000^{‡}
Italy (FIMI)	Gold	25,000^{‡}
Poland (ZPAV)	Gold	10,000^{‡}
Spain (Promusicae)	Gold	20,000^{‡}
United Kingdom (BPI)	Platinum	300,000^{‡}
^{‡} Sales+streaming figures based on certification alone.
