= Nobody but Me (Michael Bublé song) =

Single by Michael Bublé featuring Black Thought

from the album Nobody but Me
- Released: August 9, 2016
- Recorded: 2015–16
- Genre: Power pop; hip hop
- Length: 2:59
- Label: Reprise
- Songwriter(s): Michael Bublé; Alan Chang; Bryan Lipps; Erik Kertes; Jason Goldman
- Producer(s): Michael Bublé; Chang; Goldman; Carlsson

Michael Bublé singles chronology
"The More You Give (The More You'll Have)" (2015)	"Nobody but Me" (2016)	"I Believe in You" (2016)

Black Thought singles chronology
"Nobody but Me" (2016)

Music video
- "Michael Bublé – Nobody But Me [Official Music Video]" on YouTube

"Nobody but Me" is a song by Canadian recording artist Michael Bublé, featuring American rapper Black Thought from the group The Roots. It was released on August 9, 2016 through Reprise Records as the lead single from his seventh studio album of the same name.

== Music video ==
A lyric video premiered on Bublé's YouTube channel on August 18, 2016. The official music video followed afterwards on October 11, 2016. The video takes inspiration from the 1960s show The Dating Game, with Bublé playing all three eligible bachelors: a glasses-wearing nerd, a narcissistic ladies man sporting bell-bottom trousers and sideburns, and a beatnik, beret-wearing French man.

== Charts ==
=== Weekly charts ===
Chart (2016–17)	Peak position
Belgium (Ultratip Bubbling Under Flanders)	3
Belgium (Ultratip Bubbling Under Wallonia)	19
Canada (Canadian Hot 100)	70
Canada AC (Billboard)	4
Canada Hot AC (Billboard)	21
France (SNEP)	151
Scotland (OCC)	27
UK Singles Downloads (OCC)	33
UK Singles (OCC)	77
US Adult Contemporary (Billboard)	10

=== Year-end charts ===
Chart (2016)	Position
US Adult Contemporary (Billboard)	43
Chart (2017)	Position
US Adult Contemporary (Billboard)	37
