= Michael Bublé =

Canadian singer (born 1975)

Michael Bublé OBC
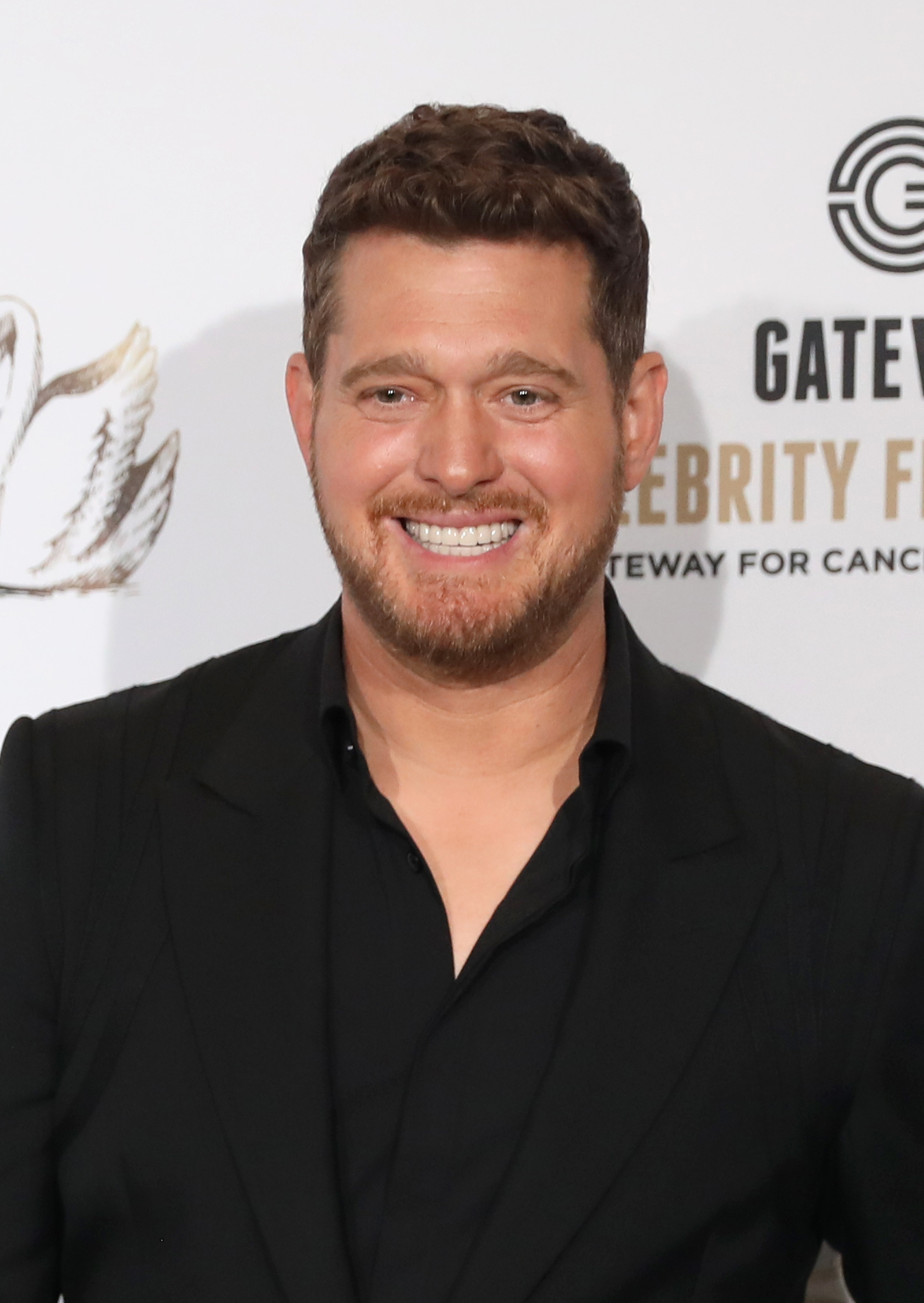
- Bublé in 2024
- Born: Michael Steven Bublé; September 9, 1975 (age 51); Burnaby, British Columbia, Canada
- Citizenship: Canada; Italy
- Occupations: Singer; songwriter; record producer
- Years active: 1994–present
- Spouse: Luisana Lopilato (m. 2011)
- Children: 4
- Musical career
- Genres: Easy listening; jazz; swing; traditional pop
- Instruments: Vocals
- Labels: 143; Reprise
- Website: michaelbuble.com

Signature
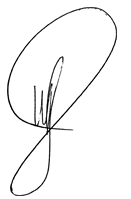

Michael Steven Bublé (/buːˈbleɪ/ boo-BLAY; born September 9, 1975) is a Canadian singer and songwriter. Regarded as a pop icon, he is often credited for helping to renew public interest and appreciation for traditional pop standards and the Great American Songbook. Bublé has sold over 75 million records worldwide, and won numerous awards, including five Grammy Awards and fifteen Juno Awards.

In 2003, Bublé's self-titled third album reached the top ten in Canada and the United Kingdom. He found a worldwide audience with his 2005 album It's Time and his 2007 album Call Me Irresponsible – which reached number one on the Canadian Albums Chart, the UK Albums Chart, the US Billboard 200, the Australian ARIA Albums Chart and several European charts. His 2009 album Crazy Love debuted at number one on the US Billboard 200 after three days of sales, and remained there for two weeks. It was also his fourth number-one album on Billboard's Top Jazz Albums chart.

His 2011 holiday album, Christmas, was in first place on the Billboard 200 for the final four weeks of 2011 and the first week of 2012, totalling five weeks atop the chart, it also made the top 5 in the United Kingdom. With this, Christmas became his third-consecutive number-one album on the chart. To Be Loved was released in April 2013, followed by Nobody but Me in October 2016 and Love in November 2018.

== Early life and musical beginnings ==
Michael Steven Bublé was born in Burnaby, British Columbia, Canada, on September 9, 1975, to Lewis Bublé, a fisherman, and Amber (née Santaga), a homemaker. Bublé's paternal and maternal great-grandparents immigrated to Canada from Italy. His surname was originally spelled "Bubli", and some of his paternal ancestors came from Istria. Bublé stated: "[On the side of the family native to modern-day Croatia] some say we're Yugoslavian, others that we're Italian." He has two younger sisters, Brandee, a children's book author, and Crystal, an actress. He and his siblings were raised Roman Catholic. He attended Seaforth Elementary School and Cariboo Hill Secondary School.

According to an Oprah Winfrey interview on October 10, 2009, Bublé dreamed of becoming a famous singer since he was two. When he was a teenager, he slept with his Bible and prayed to become a singer. His interest in jazz began at around age five when his family played Bing Crosby's White Christmas album. His musical influences include Frank Sinatra, Dean Martin, Tony Bennett, Elvis Presley, Bobby Darin and Sam Cooke.

The first time his family noticed his singing talent was during the Christmas holidays, when Bublé was 13 years old, and they heard him powerfully sing the phrase "May your days be merry and bright" when the family was singing to the song "White Christmas" on a car ride.

Bublé also has a strong passion for ice hockey and wanted to become a professional hockey player for the Vancouver Canucks growing up, but believed he was not good enough. "I wanted so bad to be a hockey player... If I was any good at hockey, I probably wouldn't be singing right now." He often played hockey in his youth, watched Vancouver Canucks games with his father, and said that he "went to every single home game as a kid... I remember I wanted to be Gary Lupul, I wanted to be Patrik Sundstrom and Ivan Hlinka. I used to think that being named Michael Bublé was pretty cool because I was close to being called Jiri Bubla." Bublé shared his hockey interest with his grandfather.

From the age of 14, Bublé spent six years working during the summer as a commercial fisherman with his father and crewmates. He called the experience "the most deadly physical work I'll ever know in my lifetime. We'd be gone for two, sometimes three months at a time and the experience of living and working among guys over twice my age taught me a lot about responsibility and what it means to be a man."

His first singing engagements were in nightclubs at age 16 and were facilitated by his Italian grandfather Demetrio Santagà, a plumber from Preganziol, Treviso, who offered his plumbing services in exchange for stage time for his grandson. Bublé's grandfather paid for his singing lessons. Both his voice teacher, Sandi Siemens, and his maternal grandfather never stopped believing that he would become a star. Bublé's maternal grandmother, Iolanda (née Moscone), was also Italian, from Carrufo, L'Aquila.

Bublé grew up listening to his grandfather's collection of jazz records and credits his grandfather in encouraging his love for jazz music. "My grandfather was really my best friend growing up. He was the one who opened me up to a whole world of music that seemed to have been passed over by my generation. Although I like rock and roll and modern music, the first time my granddad played me the Mills Brothers, something magical happened. The lyrics were so romantic, so real, the way a song should be for me. It was like seeing my future flash before me. I wanted to be a singer and I knew that this was the music that I wanted to sing."

Bublé never stopped believing he would become a star but admitted he was probably the only one who believed in his dream, stating that even his maternal grandfather thought Bublé was going to be "an opening act for somebody in Las Vegas". He stated he never learned to read and write music, using only emotion to drive his songwriting ability.

At age 18, Bublé entered a local talent contest and won, but was disqualified by organizer Bev Delich for being underage. Delich entered him in the Canadian Youth Talent Search. After Bublé won that contest, he asked Delich to be his manager. Delich represented him for the next seven years, during which Bublé worked diligently at any job that came along: clubs, conventions, cruise ships, hotel lounges, shopping malls, and talent shows.

In 1996, Bublé appeared in TV's Death Game (also known as Mortal Challenge) as a Drome Groupie. Also in 1996, he appeared (uncredited) in two episodes of The X-Files as a member of a submarine crew. His first national TV performance was on a 1997 award-winning Bravo! documentary titled Big Band Boom!, directed by Mark Glover Masterson. Beginning in 1997, he became a frequent guest on Vicki Gabereau's national talk show on the CTV network. During its first season, the Vancouver-based programme aired live, which ultimately worked in Bublé's favour. When a scheduled guest was forced to cancel, the show's music producer often asked Bublé to fill in at the last minute. The Gabereau appearances provided Bublé with great exposure, but they also helped the singer hone his television skills as a performer and as an interview guest. In a mutual show of gratitude, Bublé appeared on the final Gabereau show in 2005, along with Jann Arden and Elvis Costello.

Bublé received two Genie Award nominations for Best Original Song in 2000 for "I've Never Been in Love Before" and "Dumb ol' Heart", two songs he wrote for the film Here's to Life!. He recorded three independent albums: First Dance (1996), Babalu (2001), and Dream (2002).

== Music career ==
=== 2000–2002: Early career ===
Michael McSweeney, an aide to former prime minister Brian Mulroney, saw Bublé's performance at a business party and received a copy of Bublé's self-financed independent album. McSweeney showed the album to Mulroney and his wife. Bublé subsequently was invited to sing at the wedding of Mulroney's daughter, Caroline, where he sang Kurt Weill's "Mack the Knife". At the wedding, Bublé was introduced to David Foster, a multiple Grammy Award-winning producer and record executive who previously had worked with artists such as Madonna, Brandy Norwood, Whitney Houston, Michael Jackson, Céline Dion, Barbra Streisand, Kenny G, Cher, Josh Groban, and Andrea Bocelli.

David Foster was reluctant to sign Bublé to his 143 Records label because he "didn't know how to market this kind of music". Bublé moved to Los Angeles with his agent for a brief period to convince Foster to sign him. Eventually, Foster agreed to produce an album for him if he raised $500,000 to cover the costs of the production (which Bublé did). Foster ended up covering the costs of production under his label, with no assurances of support from Warner Bros. Additionally, Bublé received the personal stamp of approval and support of Foster's friend, musician and songwriter Paul Anka. After David Foster agreed to produce Bublé's debut album, Bruce Allen, whom Bublé had pursued for years to be his manager, also signed Bublé. Bublé appeared in two films during this period: as a karaoke singer in Duets in 2000, and a club owner in Totally Blonde in 2001.

=== 2003–2004: Michael Bublé ===
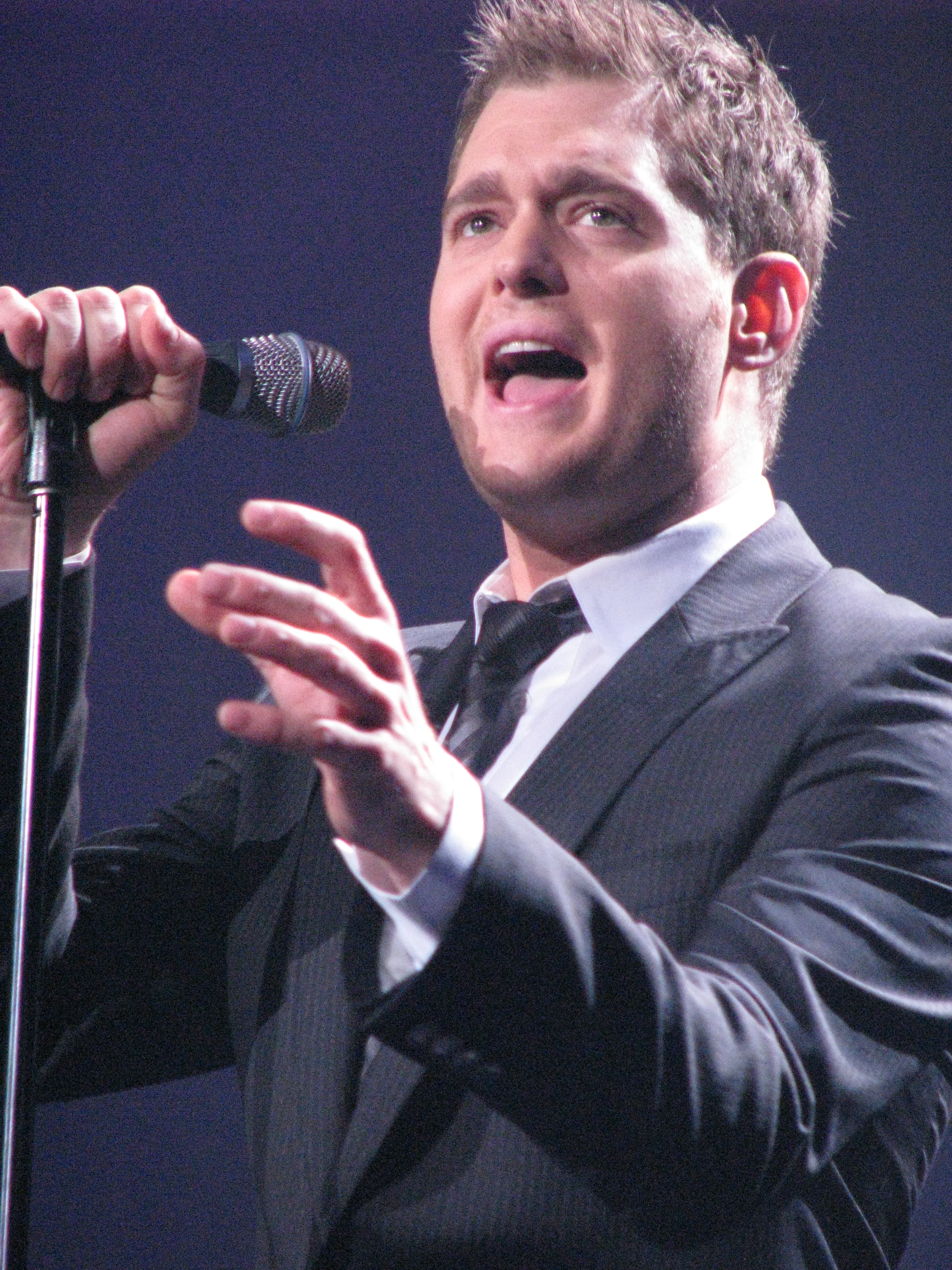
Bublé in 2008

Bublé's self-titled debut album was released on February 11, 2003, by 143 Records/Reprise Records. The album features a range of standards from various eras including "Fever", "The Way You Look Tonight", "For Once in My Life", "Moondance" and "You'll Never Find Another Love Like Mine". Also on the album is "How Can You Mend a Broken Heart?", with Barry Gibb of the Bee Gees singing backing vocals. The album went to the top 10 in Canada, United Kingdom, South Africa and reached No. 1 in Australia. It was No. 33 on the ARIA Top 100 Albums of 2003.

Bublé appeared nationally on television in the United States on the Today program on February 14, 2003. In November 2003, Bublé released a Christmas EP Let it Snow, containing five previously unreleased tracks, that peaked at 56 on the Billboard 200. The title track reached the top 40 of the Australia singles chart. A live DVD/CD called Come Fly with Me was released in early 2004. The Come Fly with Me CD was No. 99 on the Aria Top 100 Albums of 2004. The DVD included live footage and behind-the-scenes footage of Bublé's first world tour. The CD included three new studio tracks, two live recordings of new songs, and three live recordings of songs from the album Michael Bublé. The album peaked at 55 on the Billboard 200. In November 2004, the Christmas edition of his debut album was released as a two-disc set that included both the Michael Bublé and the Let It Snow EP.

Bublé won New Artist of the Year at the 2004 Juno Awards, and his album was nominated for Album of the Year but lost to Sam Roberts. He appeared in the 2003 film The Snow Walker. Also in 2003, he played a lounge performer on an episode of Days of Our Lives. In 2004, he appeared as himself in Las Vegas.

Songs from Bublé's debut album ("For Once in My Life", "Kissing a Fool") were released on the soundtrack for the movie Down with Love (2003). The soundtrack also included a previously unreleased duet with Holly Palmer of the movie's title theme. The Junkie XL remix of the theme for the 1960s TV cartoon version of Spider-Man from Bublé's Babalu album was played during the closing credits of Spider-Man 2 (2004), and this version was also released as a single. A CD was released in 2003 of the 7 songs that Bublé sang for Totally Blonde, calling it Totally Bublé. Bublé collaborated with the Barenaked Ladies for "Elf's Lament", a song on their 2004 Christmas album Barenaked for the Holidays.

=== 2005–2006: It's Time ===
Bublé's second studio album, It's Time, was released on February 8, 2005, again by 143/Reprise Records. The album also included standards from a variety of eras including "You Don't Know Me", "Feeling Good", "Can't Buy Me Love", "Save the Last Dance for Me", "Song for You", and "Quando, Quando, Quando" (a duet with Canadian pop singer Nelly Furtado). It also included an original track, "Home", co-written by Bublé, his musical director Alan Chang, and Amy Foster-Gilles.

The album reached No. 1 in Canada, Italy, Japan, and on the Billboard Top Jazz chart, No. 2 in Australia, and No. 7 on the Billboard 200. Additionally it reached the top 10 in the United Kingdom, Switzerland, Norway, Austria, and Sweden. The album spent 104 weeks on the Billboard Top Jazz chart, including a record-breaking 78 weeks in the No. 1 spot. It's Time was Billboard's Top Jazz Album in both 2005 and 2006. The first single, "Feeling Good", met with little commercial success. However, the second single from the album, "Home", reached No. 1 on the Billboard Adult Contemporary Tracks chart and No. 72 on the Billboard Hot 100. The third single "Save the Last Dance for Me" reached No. 5 on the Billboard AC Track Chart and No. 99 on the Billboard Hot 100.

In 2005, he appeared in a commercial for Starbucks' Frappucino line, singing his single "Come Fly with Me". The single appeared as a bonus track for a Starbucks edition release of It's Time.

He won four Juno Awards in 2006: Album of the Year and Pop Album of the Year (It's Time), Single of the Year ("Home"), and Artist of the Year.

He was nominated twice for a Grammy in the category Best Traditional Pop Vocal Album in 2006 (It's Time) and 2007 (Caught in the Act), but lost both times to Tony Bennett. In 2007, Bublé received one Juno nomination, for Fan Choice, but lost to Nelly Furtado.

=== 2007–2008: Call Me Irresponsible ===
Bublé's third studio album, Call Me Irresponsible, was released on May 1, 2007, by 143/Reprise Records. His third effort included songs from different eras such as "Always on My Mind", "Dream", "I've Got the World on a String", and "Comin' Home Baby" (a duet with Boyz II Men). In the US, the album debuted at number two on the Billboard 200 and rose to number one in its second week.

=== 2009–2012: Crazy Love ===
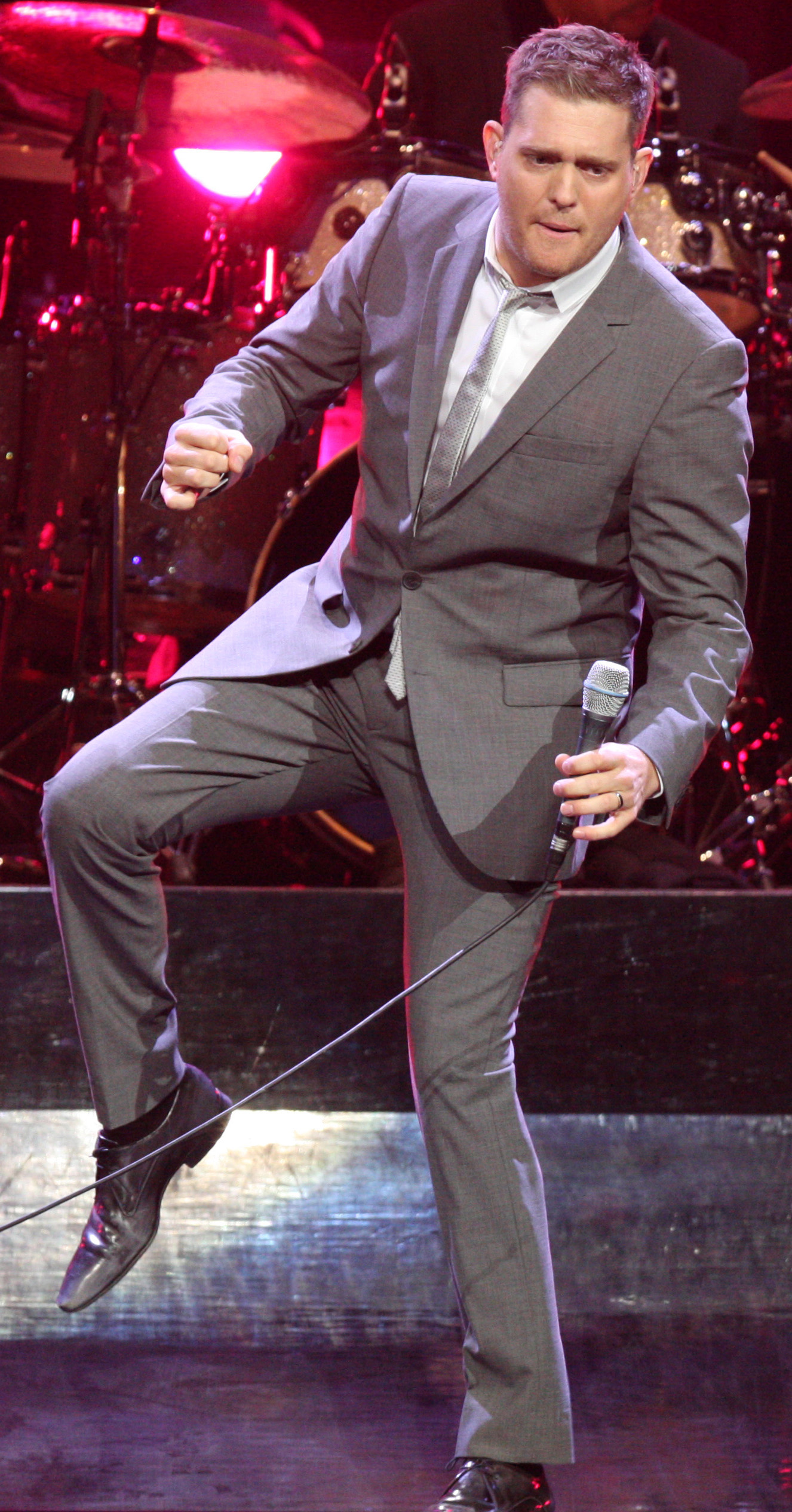
Bublé performing in February 2011

His fourth studio album, Crazy Love, was set to be released by 143/Reprise Records on October 13, 2009. However, an early release in the United States happened on October 9, 2009, in which Bublé appeared on Oprah that same day and performed the album's first single "Haven't Met You Yet". The album was also promoted in an interview with George Stroumboulopoulos on The Hour on October 17, 2009, and on the December 22, 2009, episode of The Glenn Beck Program.

This album contains 12 tracks (and one bonus track), including two original songs co-written by Bublé, "Haven't Met You Yet" and "Hold On". Its first single, "Haven't Met You Yet", was released August 31, 2009, and reached No. 1 on Billboard's Canadian Adult Contemporary chart. Most of the tracks off the album were recorded live because Bublé did not want his album to sound overproduced and slick. Bublé wrote the opening part for his cover on the single "Cry Me a River" in Bond-like theme because he wanted the song to sound very cinematic and bombastic. Crazy Love debuted at No. 1 on the Billboard 200 chart, becoming Bublé's fourth No. 1 album on Billboard's Top Jazz Albums chart. It also debuted at No. 1 in Australia and Canada, where it became his fastest-selling album. The album was supported by the Crazy Love Tour. During the tour, Bublé performed two nights at the new Aviva Stadium in Dublin, Ireland, which were the first concerts to take place at the venue.

On April 18, 2010, Bublé won four Juno Awards for Juno Fan Choice Award, Single of the Year ("Haven't Met You Yet"), Album of the Year (Crazy Love) and Pop Album of the Year (Crazy Love), plus two Juno nominations for Artist of the Year and Songwriter of the Year. Crazy Love producers David Foster and Bob Rock both received two separate nominations of their own for the Jack Richardson Producer of the Year Award, with Bob Rock winning the award.

Bublé re-released Crazy Love on October 25, 2010, in the US, with an earlier release date of October 15, 2010, for Europe. The special edition is called "Crazy Love: Hollywood Edition", and contains several bonus tracks including Bublé's newest single, "Hollywood", co-written with Toronto songwriter and pianist Robert G. Scott. On September 7, 2010, "Hollywood" was released worldwide on radio and as a digital single on iTunes. He recently played to 100,000 people at the Aviva Stadium in Dublin, his biggest concert to date.

In October 2011, Bublé released his fifth studio album, Christmas, which rose to the top of the US and UK charts. Christmas has been the best-selling Christmas album in Australia each year since its release.

==== Olympics and TV ====
Bublé took part in the torch relay in Vancouver before the opening ceremony of the 2010 Winter Olympics. He performed on the Today Show on February 12, the day of the opening ceremony and during the broadcast on Grouse Mountain. The introduction for his song "Cry Me a River" was chosen as the theme for the BBC's coverage of the Winter Olympics.

He performed with other Canadian celebrities at the closing ceremony, singing a version of "Maple Leaf Forever" and appearing as a Mountie but having his uniform torn off to reveal a white tuxedo. He appeared in the TV special Michael Bublé's Canada, which aired on Australian cable television in January, ahead of the 2010 Winter Games.

He was a guest on the comedy TV program Colbert Report for Colbert's 2010 Vancouver Winter Games coverage.

In 2009, he appeared with neuroscientist Daniel Levitin on the television program My Musical Brain, which was based on Levitin's book This Is Your Brain on Music. Also in 2009, he took part in series 6 of The X Factor in the UK. He was the celebrity mentor for the finalists in week 3 and also appeared on the finale, duetting with Stacey Solomon.

He was featured in an ITV special called This Is Michael Bublé. On February 23, 2011, he was the narrator of BBC Radio 2's Song Stories "My Way".

=== 2013–2017: To Be Loved and Nobody but Me ===
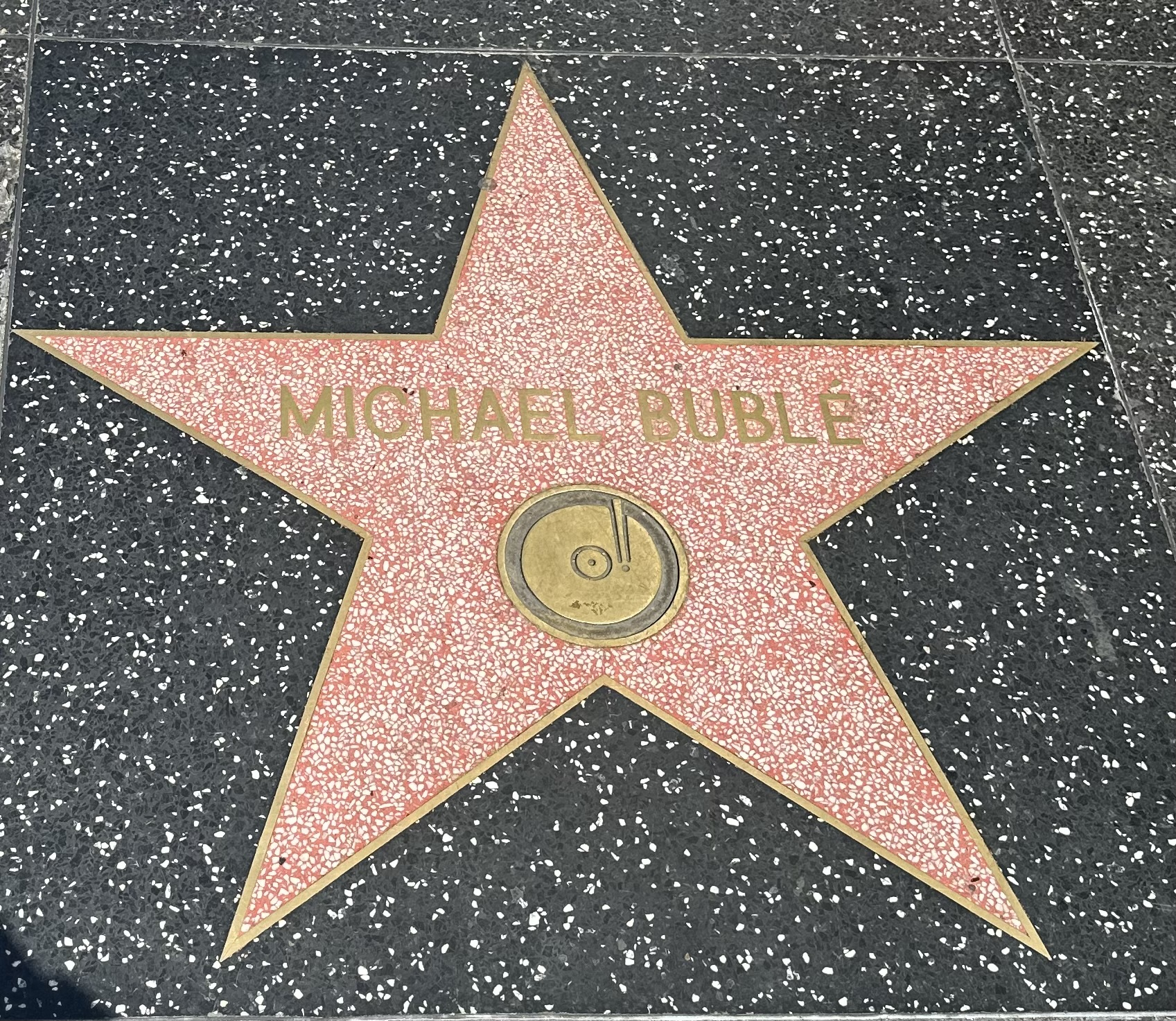
Michael Bublé's star of the Hollywood Walk of Fame

Bublé released To Be Loved on April 15, 2013 (regional releases include April 22 in Canada and April 23 in the US). The lead single, "It's a Beautiful Day", was released on February 25, 2013. To Be Loved debuted at number-one on the Billboard 200, becoming the crooner's fourth consecutive number-one album on the chart.

He was featured in the ITV documentary Michael Bublé's Day Off which aired on June 30, 2013. On December 18, 2013, he performed his 3rd Annual Christmas Special with NBC. Special guests included Mariah Carey, Mary J. Blige, Queen Latifah, and David Foster.

The To Be Loved Tour was the fifth concert tour by Canadian singer Michael Bublé. Launched in support of his sixth studio album To Be Loved (2013), the tour began on June 30, 2013, with a series of ten concerts at The O2 Arena in London and ended on March 22, 2015, in Johannesburg.

To advertise Michael Bublé's Christmas in Hollywood on NBC, he released a Christmas song called "The More You Give (The More You'll Have)".

His seventh studio album, Nobody but Me, was released on October 21, 2016.

The titular lead single features Black Thought of The Roots and was released on August 19, 2016. During the same month, his perfume went on sale in thirty countries.

=== 2018–2021: Love ===
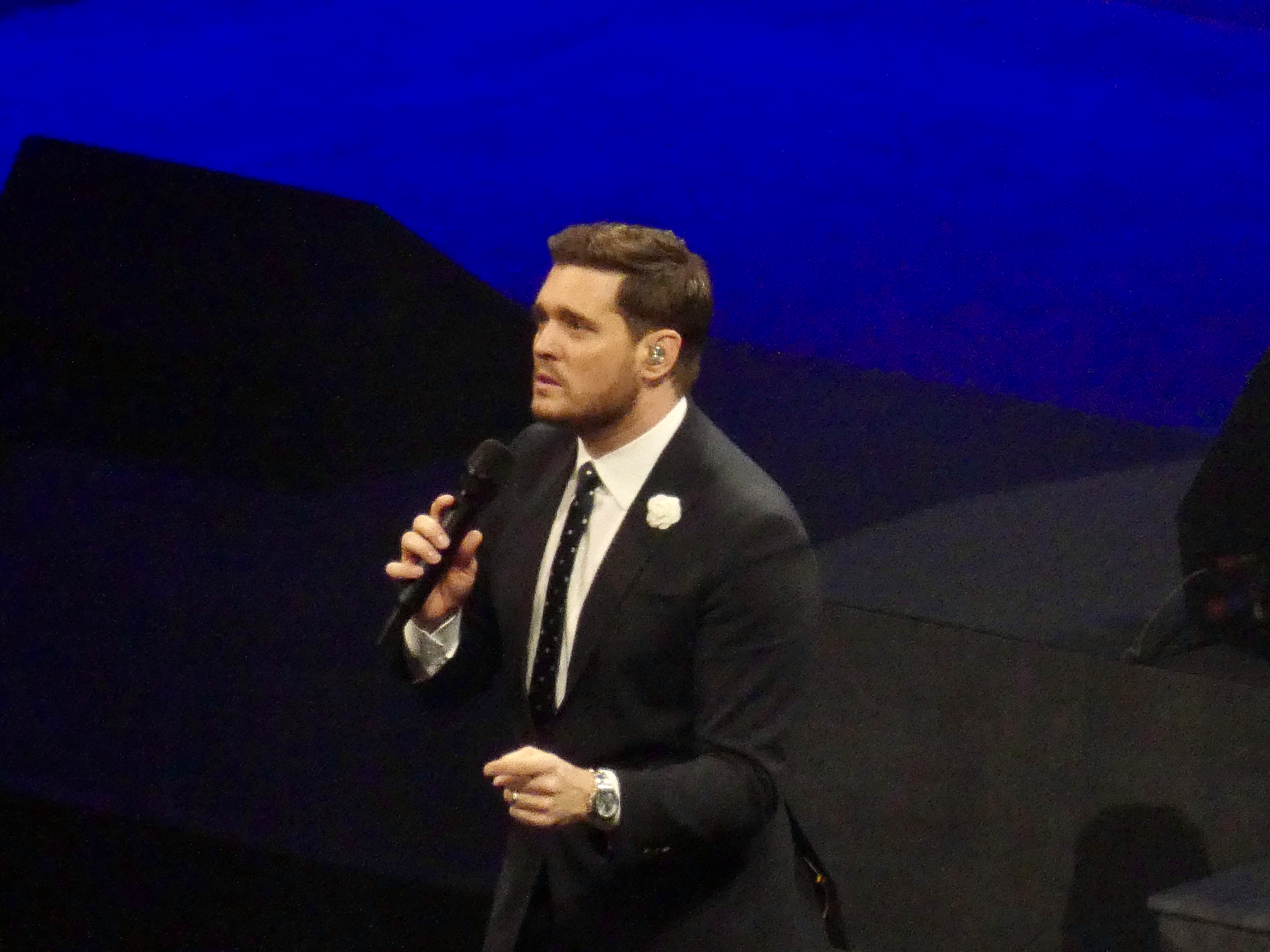
Bublé in 2019

His eighth studio album Love (written as the heart emoji, ❤️) was released on November 16, 2018, with the first single "When I Fall in Love" preceding it on September 27, 2018. In November, he announced he would embarking on a tour in 2019 in honor of the album; his An Evening with Michael Bublé tour kicked off in Tampa on February 13, 2019.

On December 15, 2018, Bublé was the musical guest for the final of the sixteenth edition of BBC's Strictly Come Dancing. On January 17, 2019, it was announced that Bublé would star in a Super Bowl commercial for Bubly sparkling water.

=== 2022–present: Higher and The Voice ===
On January 29, 2022, Bublé announced that his ninth studio album, Higher, would be released on March 25. The album was his first studio album since Love (2018).

Dancing With The Stars on Disney+ celebrated "Michael Bublé Night" on October 24, 2022, with Bublé serving as a guest judge, and performing two songs, including Higher.

On May 13, 2024, it was announced that Bublé would be featured as a coach on the 26th season of The Voice. His final artist, Sofronio Vasquez, won the season making Bublé the winning coach on his first season. Bublé returned as a coach for the 27th season and became the winning coach for the second consecutive time with his artist Adam David. In May 2025, it was announced that Bublé would return for the 28th season, which premiered in late 2025. In June 2025, Bublé joined Singer, the Chinese competition show for professional singers, for one episode. On June 12, 2026, Bublé performed at the second opening ceremony of the 2026 FIFA World Cup in Toronto, Canada.

=== Use of pitch correction ===
Bublé has criticized pitch correction tool AutoTune for being overused and making all singers sound "like robots", hiding their true sound, but admits to using it when recording pop music. He justifies it as a way to get into Top 40 radio, since "if you don't have it, you don't really get played" and likens it to "cosmetic surgery" for minor fixes that is fine if not overused, but misses the unadulterated sound of old. Arts interviewer Brad Wheeler, however, opined in The Globe and Mail in 2013 that Bublé's autotuned vocals on "It's a Beautiful Day" are "positively inhuman, devoid of DNA", while Bublé's producer Bob Rock saw autotune as almost a must-use tool that was currently fashionable.

== Personal life ==
Bublé resides in Burnaby, British Columbia, with his wife and children. He once had a home in Croydon, London.

He holds dual Italian and Canadian citizenship.

An avid hockey fan since childhood, he is a prominent celebrity supporter of the Vancouver Canucks. Since December 2008, he has co-owned the Vancouver Giants. Bublé requires "one local team hockey puck" in his dressing room as part of his contract to concert promoters in every city.

On February 12, 2009, he pledged a donation of A$50,000 to the victims of the Black Saturday bushfires in Victoria, Australia, at a charity concert at Lakeside Secondary School.

=== Relationships ===
Bublé was previously engaged to actress Debbie Timuss, who appeared with him in the musicals Red Rock Diner in 1996 and Dean Regan's Forever Swing in 1998. Timuss was listed as one of the dedicatees in Bublé's self-titled album Michael Bublé and It's Time and sang background vocals for it. While in Italy, he co-wrote the hit single "Home" for her. She was featured in the music video for "Home". Their engagement ended in November 2005 and inspired him to write "Lost".

During an appearance at Australian television's Logie Awards in 2005, Bublé met English actress Emily Blunt and they soon began dating. She sang background vocals on "Me and Mrs. Jones", and "Everything" was written by Bublé for her.

After his relationship with Blunt ended in July 2008, Bublé began dating Argentine actress Luisana Lopilato; they became engaged in November 2009 and married in March 2011 in Buenos Aires. Bublé co-wrote the hit single "Haven't Met You Yet" for Lopilato while they were dating and she appeared in his music video. The couple have four children: sons born in 2013 and 2016 and daughters born in 2018 and 2022.

Bublé's oldest son was diagnosed with hepatoblastoma in 2016. The singer canceled his planned tour after receiving news of the diagnosis, spending time with his son during chemotherapy and radiotherapy. Bublé discussed this with British talk show host James Corden in 2018. Bublé's son has since fully recovered.

== Discography ==
- BaBalu (2001)
- Dream (2002)
- Michael Bublé (2003)
- It's Time (2005)
- Call Me Irresponsible (2007)
- Crazy Love (2009)
- Christmas (2011)
- To Be Loved (2013)
- Nobody but Me (2016)
- Love (2018)
- Higher (2022)

== Concert tours and residency ==
- Michael Bublé: Live in Concert (2004)
- It's Time Tour (2005–2006)
- Call Me Irresponsible Tour (2007–2008)
- Crazy Love Tour (2010–2012)
- To Be Loved Tour (2013–2015)
- An Evening with Michael Bublé (2019–2022)
- Higher Tour (2022–2023)

=== Residencies ===
- A Las Vegas Limited Engagement (2022)

== Filmography ==
=== Film ===
Year	Title	Role	Notes
2000	Duets	Finale singer	
2001	Totally Blonde	Van Martin	
2003	The Snow Walker	Hap	
2016	Tour Stop 148	Himself	

=== Television ===
Year	Title	Role	Notes
1996	The X-Files	Submarine sailor	2 episodes
1996	Death Game	Drome Groupie	Television movie; Credited as Mike Buble
2003	Days of Our Lives	Himself	Episode: "9498"
2004	I Love the '90s	Himself	Miniseries
2004	Las Vegas	Himself	Episode: "Catch of the Day"
2005	I Love the '90s: Part Deux	Himself	Miniseries
2005	I Love the '80s 3-D	Himself	Miniseries
2005	I Love the Holidays	Himself	Special
2005	Da Kath & Kim Code	Himself	Television movie
2009	Corner Gas	Himself	Episode: "TV Free Dog River"
2010–2015	Saturday Night Live	Himself (musical guest)	3 episodes
2011	A Michael Bublé Christmas	Himself	Television special
2011	Michael Bublé: Home for Christmas	Himself	Television special
2011	Carols in the Domain	Himself	Television special
2012	Michael Bublé: Home for the Holidays	Himself	Television special
2013	Michael Bublé's 3rd Annual Christmas Special	Himself	Television special
2013, 2018	Juno Awards	Himself (host)	Television special
2014	Michael Bublé's Christmas in New York	Himself	Television special
2015	Michael Bublé's Christmas in Hollywood	Himself	Television special
2016	Michael Bublé's Sings and Swings	Himself	Television special
2019	Moon and Me	Himself (voice)	Episode: "The Silly Song" (series 1, episode 8); Michael sang the eponymous song "The Horsey in the House"
2021	Michael Buble's Christmas in the City	Himself	Television special
2022	Dancing with the Stars – Michael Bublé Night	Himself / Guest Judge	Television special
2024–2025	The Voice	Himself / Coach	Season 26-season 28
2025	Phineas and Ferb	Himself (voice)	Episode: "Tropey McTropeface/Biblio-Blast!"
2025	The Reluctant Traveler	Himself	Episode: "Going Wild for a Weekend in Vancouver"

== Awards and nominations ==
Michael Bublé awards and nominations
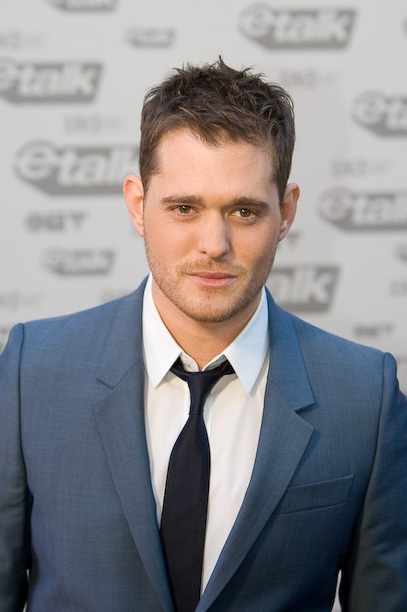
Awards and nominations
Award	Wins	Nominations
American Music Awards	1	2
Brit	0	3
Grammy	5	12
Juno	15	39

Totals (Note: Certain award groups do not simply award one winner. They acknowledge several different recipients, have runners-up, and have third place. Since this is a specific recognition and is different from losing an award, runner-up mentions are considered wins in this award tally. For simplification and to avoid errors, each award in this list has been presumed to have had a prior nomination.)
- Wins: 30
- Nominations: 55

Award	Year (Note: Indicates the year of ceremony. Each year is linked to the article about the awards held that year, wherever possible.)	Recipient(s) and nominee(s)	Category	Result	Ref.
American Music Awards	2006	Himself	Favorite Adult Contemporary Artist	Nominated	
American Music Awards	2010	Himself	Favorite Adult Contemporary Artist	Won	
ARIA Music Awards	2010	Crazy Love	Best International Artist	Nominated	
ARIA Music Awards	2012	Christmas	Best International Artist	Nominated	
BC Entertainment Hall of Fame	2009	Himself	Music	Inducted	
Billboard Music Awards	2011	Crazy Love Tour	Best International Artist	Nominated	
Billboard Music Awards	2012	Christmas	Top Billboard 200 Album	Nominated	
Billboard Music Awards	2012	Himself	Top Billboard 200 Artist	Nominated	
Billboard Music Awards	2012	Christmas	Top Pop Album	Nominated	
Brit Awards	2008	Himself	International Male Solo Artist	Nominated	
Brit Awards	2010	Himself	International Male Solo Artist	Nominated	
Brit Awards	2013	Himself	International Male Solo Artist	Nominated	
Canada's Walk of Fame	2015	Himself	Arts & Entertainment	Inducted	
Daytime Emmy Awards	2017	"Nobody but Me" on Live! with Kelly	Outstanding Musical Performance in a Daytime Program	Nominated	
Echo Music Prize	2006	It's Time	Jazz Production of the Year	Won	
Echo Music Prize	2006	It's Time	International Newcomer of the Year	Nominated	
Echo Music Prize	2008	Call Me Irresponsible	International Pop/Rock Male Artist of the Year	Nominated	
Echo Music Prize	2012	Christmas	Best Crossover Artist	Won	
Gemini Awards	2007	"How About You?" (with Lou Pomanti)	Best Performance or Host in a Variety Program or Series for Outstanding Musical Performance in a Daytime Program	Nominated	
Genie Awards	2001	"Dumb Ol' Heart" from Here's to Life!	Best Achievement in Music: Original Song	Nominated	
Genie Awards	2001	"I've Never Been in Love Before" from Here's to Life!	Best Achievement in Music: Original Song	Nominated	
Grammy Awards	2006	It's Time	Best Traditional Pop Vocal Album	Nominated	
Grammy Awards	2007	Caught in the Act	Best Traditional Pop Vocal Album	Nominated	
Grammy Awards	2008	Call Me Irresponsible	Best Traditional Pop Vocal Album	Won	
Grammy Awards	2008	"Everything"	Best Male Pop Vocal Performance	Nominated	
Grammy Awards	2010	Michael Bublé Meets Madison Square Garden	Best Traditional Pop Vocal Album	Won	
Grammy Awards	2011	Crazy Love	Best Traditional Pop Vocal Album	Won	
Grammy Awards	2011	"Haven't Met You Yet"	Best Male Pop Vocal Performance	Nominated	
Grammy Awards	2013	Christmas	Best Traditional Pop Vocal Album	Nominated	
Grammy Awards	2014	To Be Loved	Best Traditional Pop Vocal Album	Won	
Grammy Awards	2018	Nobody But Me	Best Traditional Pop Vocal Album	Nominated	
Grammy Awards	2020	Love (Deluxe Edition)	Best Traditional Pop Vocal Album	Nominated	
Grammy Awards	2023	Higher	Best Traditional Pop Vocal Album	Won	
Hollywood Walk of Fame	2018	Himself	Phonograph Record	Inducted	
iHeartRadio MMVAs	2005	"Home"	MuchMoreMusic Award	Nominated	
iHeartRadio MMVAs	2006	"Save the Last Dance for Me"	MuchMoreMusic Award	Won	
iHeartRadio MMVAs	2007	"Everything"	MuchMoreMusic Award	Nominated	
Juno Awards	2004	Michael Bublé	Album of the Year	Nominated	
Juno Awards	2004	Himself	Breakthrough Artist of the Year	Won	
Juno Awards	2006	It's Time	Album of the Year	Won	
Juno Awards	2006	It's Time	Pop Album of the Year	Won	
Juno Awards	2006	"Home"	Single of the Year	Won	
Juno Awards	2006	Himself	Artist of the Year	Won	
Juno Awards	2006	Himself	Fan Choice Award	Nominated	
Juno Awards	2007	Himself	Fan Choice Award	Nominated	
Juno Awards	2008	Call Me Irresponsible	Album of the Year	Nominated	
Juno Awards	2008	Call Me Irresponsible	Pop Album of the Year	Nominated	
Juno Awards	2008	"Everything"	Single of the Year	Nominated	
Juno Awards	2008	Himself	Artist of the Year	Nominated	
Juno Awards	2008	Himself	Fan Choice Award	Won	
Juno Awards	2009	"Lost"	Single of the Year	Nominated	
Juno Awards	2010	Crazy Love	Album of the Year	Won	
Juno Awards	2010	Crazy Love	Pop Album of the Year	Won	
Juno Awards	2010	"Haven't Met You Yet"	Single of the Year	Won	
Juno Awards	2010	"Haven't Met You Yet"	Songwriter of the Year	Nominated	
Juno Awards	2010	Himself	Artist of the Year	Nominated	
Juno Awards	2010	Himself	Fan Choice Award	Won	
Juno Awards	2011	Himself	Fan Choice Award	Nominated	
Juno Awards	2012	Christmas	Album of the Year	Won	
Juno Awards	2012	Himself	Artist of the Year	Nominated	
Juno Awards	2012	Himself	Fan Choice Award	Nominated	
Juno Awards	2013	Himself	Fan Choice Award	Nominated	
Juno Awards	2014	To Be Loved	Album of the Year	Nominated	
Juno Awards	2014	To Be Loved	Pop Album of the Year	Nominated	
Juno Awards	2014	"It's a Beautiful Day"	Single of the Year	Nominated	
Juno Awards	2014	Himself	Artist of the Year	Nominated	
Juno Awards	2014	Himself	Fan Choice Award	Nominated	
Juno Awards	2015	Himself	Fan Choice Award	Won	
Juno Awards	2018	Nobody but Me	Album of the Year	Nominated	
Juno Awards	2018	Nobody but Me	Adult Contemporary Album of the Year	Won	
Juno Awards	2019	Love	Adult Contemporary Album of the Year	Won	
Juno Awards	2019	Himself	Artist of the Year	Nominated	
Juno Awards	2019	Himself	Producer of the Year	Nominated	
Juno Awards	2020	Love	Album of the Year	Nominated	
Juno Awards	2023	Higher	Adult Contemporary Album of the Year	Won	
Juno Awards	2023	Himself	Artist of the Year	Nominated	
Meteor Music Awards	2010	Himself	International Male Solo Artist	Won	
People's Choice Awards	2007	"Save the Last Dance for Me"	Favorite Remake	Nominated	
People's Choice Awards	2011	Himself	Favorite Male Artist	Nominated	
People's Choice Awards	2014	To Be Loved	Favorite Album	Nominated	
People's Choice Awards	2014	Himself	Favorite Male Artist	Nominated	
Silver Clef Award	2012	Himself	International Award	Won	
World Music Award	2005	Himself	World's Best Selling Artist/Canada	Won	
World Music Award	2005	Himself	World's Best Selling Male Pop Artist	Nominated	
