= Turn It Around (Alena song) =

1999 single by Alena

- UK CD single artwork

Single by Alena
- Released: 1999
- Genre: Trance
- Label: Basic Beat; Gambler; Wonderboy
- Songwriter: Carlo Resoort

"Turn It Around" is a song written by Dutch DJ and producer Carlo Resoort and featuring singer Alena Lova. Originally distributed on white label in 1998, the single was given a commercial release in 1999 with a new remix by the UK trance music act the Space Brothers (Ricky Simmonds and Stephen Jones). The Space Brothers remix features additional lyrics credited to Simmonds and Jones.

"Turn It Around" was a success in UK and European clubs. Over the course of October 1999, it reached its peak in three Music Week dance charts: number one in the Cool Cuts Chart, number two in the Club Chart Top 40 and number six in the Pop Top 20. The song then peaked at number 14 in the UK Singles Chart in November 1999, selling nearly 25,000 copies in its first week. This was despite the lack of airplay on national radio, with the song reaching number 61 on the UK's radio airplay list for that week. It was added to BBC Radio 1's B-list.

== Critical reception ==
Music Week described "Turn It Around" as an "anthemic trance track". Dave Fowler of Muzik considered it to be a "trancey house number". He felt the release was unlikely to be as big as the Wonderboy label's recent release of Shaft's "(Mucho Mambo) Sway", but added that it was "set for positive mid-table success nonetheless". Danny Carter, writing for the Hull Daily Mail, said that the "soulful trance" track had "some beautiful chords overlaid expertly with an excellent sing-a-long vocal complemented by some nice breakdowns".

== Cover versions ==
In 2004, Dutch vocal trance group 4 Strings, founded by Carlo Resoort and Jan De Vos, released a version of "Turn It Around" from their album of the same name. It features Susanne Teutenberg on vocals and reached number 50 in the UK Singles Chart.

== Charts ==
Chart (1999)	Peak position
Europe (Eurochart Hot 100 Singles)	49
France (SNEP)	55
Netherlands (Single Top 100)	73
Netherlands (Tipparade)	17
Scotland Singles (OCC)	18
UK Singles (OCC)	14
UK Dance (OCC)	16

== Release history ==
Region	Date	Format(s)	Label(s)	Ref.
Netherlands	1999	12-inch vinyl; CD	Basic Beat	
France	1999	CD	Gambler	
United Kingdom	1 November 1999	12-inch vinyl; CD; cassette	Wonderboy	
