= Mambo Italiano =

1954 song by Bob Merrill

Single by Rosemary Clooney and the Mellomen
- B-side: "We'll Be Together Again"
- Released: October 11, 1954
- Label: Columbia
- Songwriter: Bob Merrill
- Producers: Buddy Cole, Paul Weston

"Mambo Italiano" is a popular song written by Bob Merrill in 1954 for the American singer Rosemary Clooney. The song became a hit for Clooney, reaching the top ten on record charts in the US and France and No. 1 on the UK Singles Chart in early 1955. The song has shown enduring popularity, with several cover versions and appearances in numerous films.

== Background ==
Merrill reportedly wrote it under a recording deadline, scribbling hastily on a paper napkin in an Italian restaurant in New York City, and then using the wall pay-phone to dictate the melody, rhythm and lyrics to the studio pianist, under the aegis of the conductor Mitch Miller, who produced the original record. Alongside Merrill, 'Lidianni' and 'Gabba' are also listed as writers of the song, corresponding to the pseudonyms of the Italian lyricists Gian Carlo Testoni and Gaspare Abbate, respectively.

Merrill's song provides an obvious parody of genuine mambo music, cashing in on the 1954 mambo craze in New York, while at the same time allowing Miller to set up a vehicle for Clooney's vocal talents. It is also a late example of an American novelty song in a tradition started during World War II by the Italian-American jazz singer Louis Prima, in which nonsense lyrics with an Italian-American sound are used in such a way as to present a stereotyped caricature of Italian-American people (who had been classed with "enemy alien" status and discouraged from speaking Italian) as likable, slightly brash, pleasure-loving folk. Although Clooney's own family background was Irish-American, she could perform such "Italianized" material with an entirely convincing accent, which she had readily picked up from Italian-American musicians and their families.

The nonsense lyrics were originally couched in English, mixed together with a comic jumble of Italian, Spanish, Neapolitan and gibberish (invented) words, including:

- Italian: italiano (Italian), Napoli (Naples), siciliano (Sicilian), calabrese (Calabrian), tarantella (tarantella), mozzarella (mozzarella), pizza, baccalà (salted codfish), bambino (child), vino (wine).
- Spanish: mambo, enchilada, rumba, (the Spanish words mambo and rumba are commonly used in Italian with the same meaning).
- Neapolitan: paisà (in Italian paesano; in English villager or fellow countryman).
- A number of Italian words are deliberately misspelled ("Giovanno" instead of "Giovanni", and "hello, che se dice" for "hello, what's up?"). Other words are in Italiese (goombah, from cumpà, literally godson/godfather but more broadly fellow countryman, and 'jadrool' or 'cidrule", a stupid person, closely related to cetriolo, Italian for "cucumber", but in Sicilian meaning jackass. The word tiavanna is a malapropism for Tijuana.

== Chart history ==
=== Weekly charts ===
The song reached No. 8 on the U.S. Cash Box Top 50 Best Selling Records chart, in a tandem ranking of Don Cornell, Nick Noble, Kay Armen, and Roy Rogers & Dale Evans's versions, with Don Cornell and Nick Noble's versions marked as bestsellers. The song also reached No. 7 on Billboard's Honor Roll of Hits, with Don Cornell and Nick Noble's versions listed as best sellers.

In Australia, the song charted regionally. It entered the Brisbane charts in January 1956, and reached No. 3. In Sydney, it charted twice: in January, when it reached No. 10 (in a 10-song Hit Parade), and again in March 1956 when it went to No. 4.

| Chart (1954–55) | Peak position |
|---|---|
| France (IFOP) | 8 |
| UK Singles Chart | 1 |
| US Billboard Best Sellers in Stores | 10 |
| US Billboard Most Played in Juke Boxes | 9 |
| US Billboard Most Played by Jockeys | 13 |
| US Cash Box | 8 |

== Dean Martin version ==
It was successfully covered in 1955 by the popular Italian-American singer/actor Dean Martin. In 2022, Martin's version was played briefly in a streaming commercial for Airbnb.

In 2006, German nu jazz and lounge music act Club des Belugas officially released a remix of the Dean Martin version on their album Apricoo Soul, with official authorization on behalf of Capitol Records/EMI and Martin's estate.

== Carla Boni version ==
"Mambo Italiano" became popular in Italy when Carla Boni scored a major hit with her version in 1956. Also in 1956, Renato Carosone, a singer and band leader from Naples, recorded a successful version that weaves in several fragments of Neapolitan song, of which he was a leading exponent.

== Shaft version ==
"Mambo Italiano"

Single by Shaft

from the album Pick Up on This
- Released: 2000
- Length: 2:51 (radio edit)
- Label: Wonderboy
- Songwriter: Bob Merrill
- Producers: Al and El

Shaft singles chronology
| "(Mucho Mambo) Sway" (1999) | "Mambo Italiano" (2000) | "Kiki Riri Boom" (2001) |

British electronic music duo Shaft covered the song and released it as a single in 2000. It was the follow-up to their 1999 hit, "(Mucho Mambo) Sway". This version reached number 12 on the UK Singles Chart and peaked within the top 40 in Australia, Denmark, Iceland, Ireland, and Sweden. It was later included on the duo's 2001 album, Pick Up on This.

=== Charts ===
Weekly charts

| Chart (2000) | Peak position |
|---|---|
| Australia (ARIA) | 17 |
| Denmark (IFPI) | 8 |
| Europe (Eurochart Hot 100) | 41 |
| Iceland (Íslenski Listinn Topp 40) | 5 |
| Ireland (IRMA) | 33 |
| Sweden (Sverigetopplistan) | 22 |
| Scotland Singles (Official Charts) | 14 |
| UK Singles (Official Charts) | 12 |
| UK Dance (Official Charts) | 28 |

Year-end charts

| Chart (2000) | Position |
|---|---|
| Australia (ARIA) | 86 |
| Iceland (Íslenski Listinn Topp 40) | 9 |

=== Certifications ===
| Region | Certification | Certified units/sales |
|---|---|---|
| Australia (ARIA) | Gold | 35,000^{^} |
^{^} Shipments figures based on certification alone.

== Other versions ==
Cover versions of the song made in other languages include a French translation made by the Turkish polyglot singer Darío Moreno. Other covers in various genres from around the world include a salsa setting by the Italian musician Massimo Scalici; a V-pop version by the Vietnamese group Hồ Quang Hiếu; a Mandarin version by Hong Kong singer Paula Tsui; an instrumental by the Swedish electric guitarist Mattias Eklundh; a Latin ska number by Federico Fosati and Dinamo from Mallorca. Bette Midler remade "Mambo italiano" for her 2002 album Bette Midler Sings the Rosemary Clooney Songbook. Patrizio Buanne released a cover on his album Patrizio in 2009. Dean Martin's daughter, Deana Martin released a cover on her 2006 album Memories Are Made of This. The "Mambo Italiano" tune features at the start of Lady Gaga's 2011 song "Americano". Gaga later performed "Mambo Italiano" during her Jazz & Piano residency in Las Vegas. Iggy Azalea samples the song in her 2019 single "Lola".

== Usage in film ==
In the 1955 Italian comedy film Scandal in Sorrento (Pane, amore e...), Sophia Loren dances to an instrumental arrangement of the tune, opposite Vittorio De Sica in a simplified imitation of mambo dancing.

The song was also featured in the beginning credits of the 1988 mob comedy Married to the Mob starring Alec Baldwin, during dancing scenes in both the 1996 film Big Night and Tinto Brass's 1998 Italian erotic comedy Monella. It can be heard playing in the background during a scene in Mermaids starring Cher and Winona Ryder. It was also heard in the 1999 comedy Mickey Blue Eyes starring Hugh Grant and James Caan.

In 2023, the song featured prominently in Kaurismäki's film Fallen Leaves, and as the travelling music and final credits in Book Club: The Next Chapter.
