= Avrasya Anı Evi =

Turkish Museum

Avrasya Memorial House
- Avrasya Anı Evi
- Avrasya Anı Evi
- Established: 1992; 34 years ago
- Location: Darío Moreno street, Karataş İzmir, Turkey
- Coordinates: 38°24′33″N 27°07′03″E
- Type: Memorial House
- Owner: İzmir Municipality

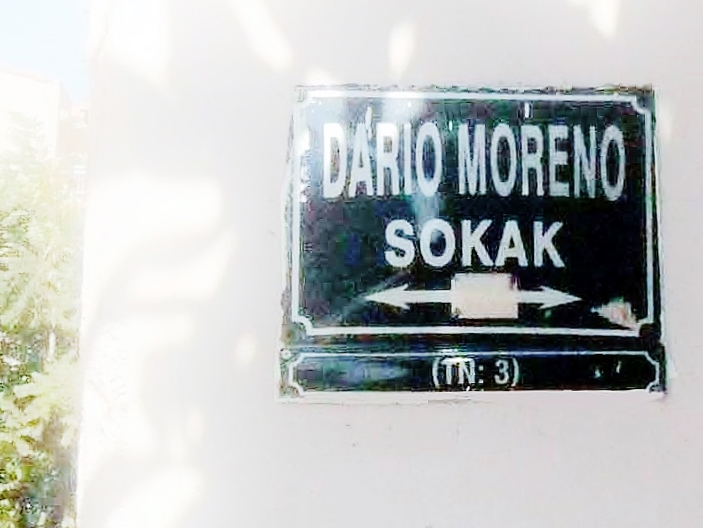
Name sign of "Darío Moreno Street" in İzmir, Turkey

Avrasya Anı Evi ("Eurasian Memorial House") is a small museum in İzmir, Turkey.

== Geography ==
The museum is in the Karataş neighborhood of İzmir. At 38°24′33″N 27°07′03″E it is on the Darío Moreno street no 11 next to the big asansör (elevator) which connects the lower quarters of the city to the high quarters.

== The museum ==
Darío Moreno (1921–1968) was a well known Turkish musician of Jewish descent. The memorial house was actually his stepfather's house. Although Darío Moreno lived only a short period in this house during the 1940s, the popular name of the house is Darío Moreno's house.

İzmir metropolitan Municipality decided to name the former 302 street which runs from the boulevard to asansör as Darío Moreno Street and a NGO named İzmir Kalkınma Platformu ("İzmir Development Agency" İZKA for short) established the museum. In 2009 two busts were erected; one of Darío Moreno and the other of Enrico Macias, an Algerian born French singer who visited the museum.
