= Carlo Resoort =

Dutch DJ, remixer and producer (born 1973)

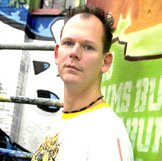

Background information
- Also known as: 4 Strings; Madelyne
- Born: 1 March 1973 (age 52)
- Origin: Numansdorp
- Genres: Trance

Carlo Resoort (born 1 March 1973) is a Dutch DJ, remixer and producer. He is best known as the main act of 4 Strings.

== Music career ==
Resoort originally began working with Jan De Vos when they found a mutual interest in dance music. The two spent all of their free time in the recording studio, and later De Vos went on to become 'DJ 4 Strings' while Resoort headed '4 Strings'. All of his albums as 4 Strings have been released in the U.S. via Ultra Records.

Resoort had his first hit with "Day Time", and later released "Take Me Away (Into the Night)", his second hit. They had some success, having been in record charts in several European countries and also Canada and Australia. Success in the United States has been limited and they have only charted on the U.S., Dance Radio Airplay, Hot Dance Singles Sales, and Rhythmic Top 40 chart. The Ultra.Trance 2007 album went to number seven on the Top Electronic Albums chart. This album was compiled by DJ 4 Strings, but only one of the songs was by 4 Strings.

4 Strings currently consists of Resoort (who mostly creates the music) and De Vos (who mostly works on production and arrangement, and performs some songs) and various guest artists on vocals.

De Vos took up the name DJ 4 Strings and does all live performances.

== Discography ==
=== Albums (as 4 Strings) ===
- Believe Ultra Records 2002
- Turn It Around Ultra Records 2004
- Mainline Ultra Records 2006

=== Singles (as 4 Strings) ===
- 2000 "Day Time"
- 2001 "Into the Night"
- 2002 "Take Me Away (Into the Night)"
- 2002 "Diving"
- 2003 "Let It Rain"
- 2003 "Summer Sun"
- 2004 "Back to Basics"
- 2004 "Turn It Around"
- 2004 "Come Closer"
- 2005 "Until You Love Me"
- 2005 "Love Is Blind"
- 2005 "Sunrise"
- 2005 "Desire"
- 2006 "Hurricane"
- 2006 "Jewel"
- 2006 "Take Me Away 2006 (Remixes)"
- 2006 "Mainline"
- 2007 "Curious" (feat. Tina Cousins)
- 2007 "Catch a Fall" (feat. Andrea Britton)
- 2008 "The Way It Should Be" (vs. DJ Shaine)
- 2009 "Let Me Take Your Breath Away"
- 2009 "Take Me Away" (2009 Remixes)
- 2009 "Music / Music Saved My Life"
- 2010 "Forever" (feat. Samantha Fox)
- 2010 "Sundown"
- 2010 "Safe From Harm" (feat. Ellie Lawson)
- 2011 "Twilight Mode"
- 2012 "Cheesecake"
- 2012 "Rise Again"
- 2012 "The Other Side"
- 2012 "Breathe Life In" (feat. Ana Criado)
- 2013 "Out to Nowhere"
- 2013 "Lights Out"
- 2013 "Ready to Fall" (feat. Seri)
- 2013 "This Heart Is Yours" (feat. Neev Kennedy)
- 2014 "Chemistry"
- 2014 "Living Colours"
- 2014 "Galaxy"
- 2014 "Monday"
- 2014 "Hold In Silence" (& Katty Heath)

=== Singles (as Carlo Resoort) ===
- "Revelation"
- "Remover"
- "O’Class"
- "Musica"
- "Rise"
- "Aurora"
- "Ayers Rock" / "Tape Delay"
- "Tom Tom / Battery"
- "Visa Versa"
- "Lifetime" / "Spacebump"
- "First Rebirth"
- "Blinded / Sun Burst"
- "Flash Player"
- "Revelations" (2010)
- "Journey to Freedom"

=== Singles (as Madelyne) ===
- "A Deeper Love"
- "Beautiful Child"

=== Remixes ===
- 2000 Angelic - It's My Turn (4 Strings Remix)
- 2001 Madelyne - Beautiful Child (A Deeper Love) [4 Strings Remix]
- 2001 Mathias Ware feat. Rob Taylor - Hey Little Girl (4 Strings Remix)
- 2001 Resistance D - You Were There (4 Strings Remix)
- 2001 Square - Nova (4 Strings Remix)
- 2002 Minimalistix - Close Cover (4 Strings Remix)
- 2002 Blank & Jones - Desire (4 Strings Remix)
- 2002 Flesh & Bones - My Time Has Come (4 Strings Remix)
- 2003 Symphony of Strings - Need You Now (Don't Want Your Love) [4 Strings Remix]
- 2003 Carlo Resoort - Remover (4 Strings Remix)
- 2006 Solid Sessions - Janeiro 2006 (4 Strings Remix)
- 2006 DJ Atmospherik - Straight Flush (4 Strings Remix)
- 2007 Re-Fuge feat. Nicole Tyler - So Real (4 Strings Remix)
- 2009 Carlo Resoort - Lifetime (4 Strings Remix)
- 2009 Jan Oostdyk - The Beginning (4-Strings Remix)
- 2010 Javah feat. Xan - Vice of Life (4 Strings Remix)
- 2010 Dereck Recay - Nebula (4 Strings Remix)
- 2010 Sash! & Jessy - All Is Love (4 Strings Classic Remix)
- 2011 Slusnik Luna - Sun 2011 (4 Strings Remix)
- 2011 Super8 & Tab - Bliss (4 Strings Remix)
- 2011 Markus Schulz ft. Jennifer Rene - Not the Same (Carlo Resoort Remix)
- 2012 Dash Berlin ft. Chris Madin - Silence in Your Heart (4 Strings Remix)
- 2012 Markus Schulz ft. Seri - Love Rain Down (4 Strings Remix)
- 2013 Omnia - The Light (4 Strings Remix)
- 2014 Lange - We Are Lucky People (4 Strings Remix)

=== Unofficial Remixes ===
- 2006 U2 - City of Blinding Lights (4 Strings Bootleg Remix)

=== Chart positions ===
"Take Me Away (Into the Night)"

| Chart (2002) | Peak position |
|---|---|
| UK Singles Chart | #15 |
| Belgian Singles Chart | #16 |
| German Singles Chart | #22 |
| Dutch Singles Chart | #25 |
| Austrian Singles Chart | #69 |
| Swiss Singles Chart | #99 |
| Australian Singles Chart | #44 |
| Billboard Hot Dance Singles Sales | #20 |

"Diving"

| Chart (2003) | Peak position |
|---|---|
| Belgian Singles Chart | #16 |
| Dutch Singles Chart | #29 |
| Canadian Singles Chart | #34 |
| UK Singles Chart | #38 |
| German Singles Chart | #73 |

"Let it Rain"

- Netherlands: No. 35
- United Kingdom: No. 49

"Turn it Around"

- United Kingdom: No. 50
- Billboard Hot Dance Singles Sales: No. 15

"Until You Love Me"

- Billboard Dance Radio Airplay: No. 21

"Day Time"

- United Kingdom: No. 48

"Curious" feat. Tina Cousins

- Billboard Dance Radio Airplay: No. 17

"Silmarillia" (4 Strings radio edit)"

- Netherlands: No. 8

"Take Me Away" (Dave Darell Radio Edit)

- United Kingdom: No. 59

== Pseudonyms ==
=== Aliases ===
4 Strings, Alena ("Turn It Around")

=== Collaborations ===
Carlos (with Piet Bervoets from Rank 1)

== See also ==
- Armin van Buuren
- Geert Huinink
- Vincent de Moor
