= Luis Demetrio =

Mexican singer and composer

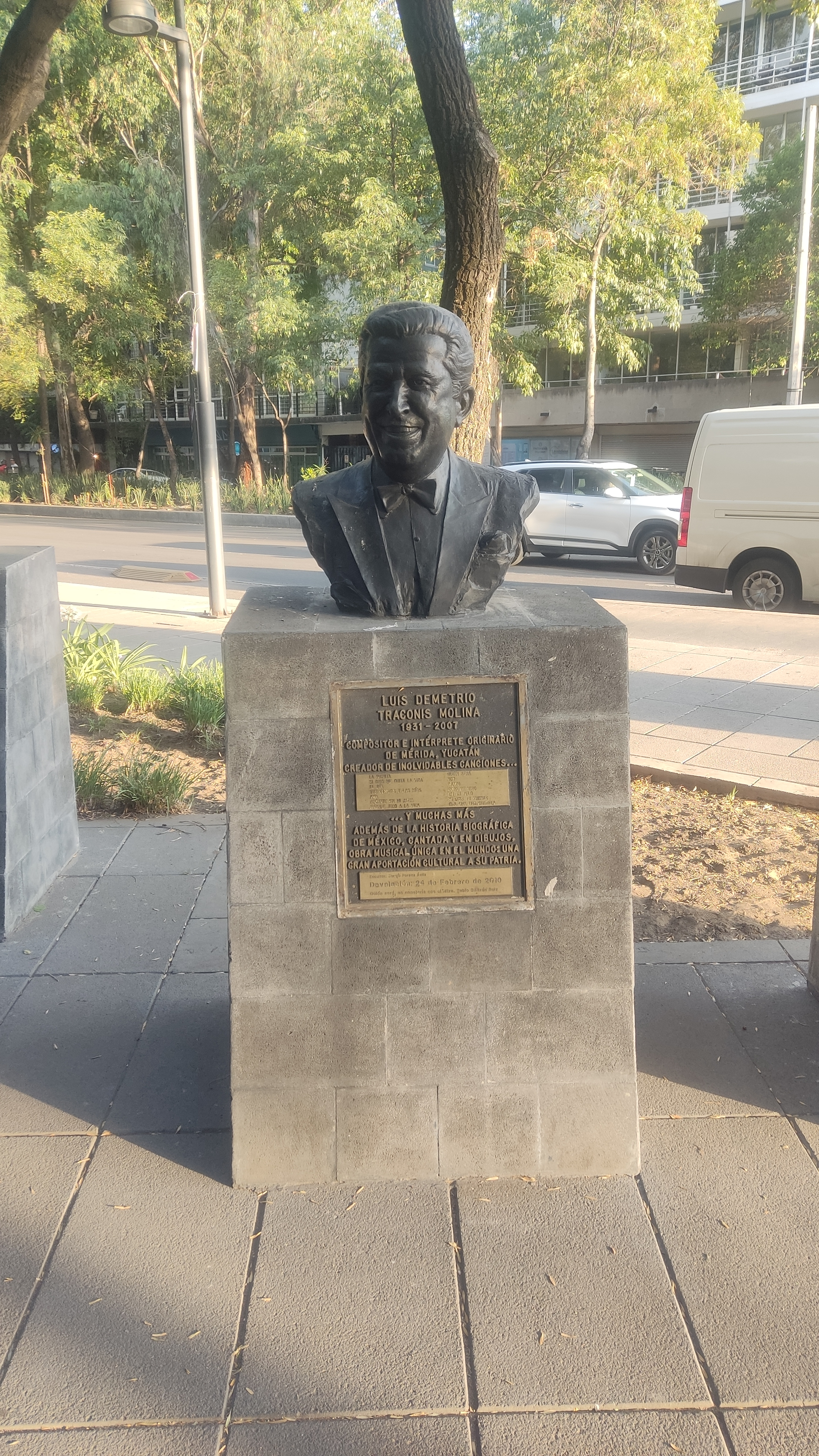
Bust in Plaza de los Compositores, Mexico City

Luis Demetrio, born Luis Demetrio Traconis Molina (April 21, 1931 – December 17, 2007), was a Mexican singer and composer. He is best known for composing the Spanish-language 1953 pop standard "¿Quién será?" and its English-language counterpart "Sway" together with Mexican bandleader Pablo Beltrán Ruiz and lyricist Norman Gimbel. The song became an international hit and was covered by Dean Martin in 1954 and by Bobby Rydell in 1960.

== Life and career ==
Luis was the youngest of four children and only son of Don Juan B. Traconis and Ofelia Molina, born in Mérida, Yucatán, Mexico. At the age of three he showed his inclination for music, playing Yucatecan popular tunes on a harmonica. At the age of 12, he composed his first song, entitled "Happiness". In 1948 he traveled to Mexico City to pursue a career in accounting, as his family wanted, but he was determined to become a musician.

In 1950, with the Avileño trio, he recorded his song “Yo no sé qué siento aquí”, almost simultaneously, Pérez Prado the 'King of Mambo presented this same song, with a new name “La Cerveza”.

When Pérez Prado met Demetrio he invited him to join the chorus of his orchestra, which was the main attraction of the popular Teatro Margo.

By 1954, at the height of Cha-Cha-Cha, Demetrio choirs Latin Cuban orchestra, directed by Maestro Ninon Mondéjar, who immediately included in its repertoire and records songs Luis Demetrio "Cha-Cha-Cha-Chavela", "In You, in You", "Do You Expect", "Cha-Cha-Cha with Melody", "Love Me a Little More", "The Salk Vaccine", and several others, to complete a dozen hits with the orchestra.

In 1955, with the famous harmonic Cuartero, who were also their countrymen, he recorded his themes "Two Strangers" and "You're Everything To Me", the latter also a big hit in the voice of the famous composer Luis Arcaraz. Arcaraz also recorded “Calendar” and “To Come Back To Me”.

In 1957, "The Gate" would become popular in the voice of Chilean singer Lucho Gatica.

In 1958, Demetrio songs were interpreted by major singers of that era: Pedro Vargas recorded "You're Poisoning"; Andy Russell, "Young and Beautiful"; Miguelito Valdez 'Mr. Babalu', made "Corazón Salvaje" successful, while Virginia and Puerto Lopez did the same with "You Waiting".

Demetrio took over the artistic direction of a major record company, retiring from his activity as a composer in 1960 and 1961.

He eventually returned as a composer, with songs such as "Day" (Angélica María); "The Wineglass" for Olga Guillot; "I Will", "Si Dios Me Quita la Vida" and "In Your Hair", (Javier Solis), "Bravo", (Celia Cruz), and "Te Necesito", for Carlos Lico

Other songs, such as "Lean On My Soul", "The Devil and I", "Your Ashes and Mine", "In the Canteen", "Art Thou My Wife", "What a Night, What a Moon and What a Cat", "Hate", "Who will" (with Pablo Beltran Ruiz), "Make the Most Juice to Life", "My Only Fault", and many others were interpreted by artists such as Eydie Gormé, Billy Vaughn, Lola Flores, Roberto Ledezma, Lucha Villa, Elena Burke, The Barry Sisters, Tito Rodriguez, Lucecita Benitez Perete, Elis Regina, Gloria Lasso, Mona Bell, Rocio Dúrcal, Alberto Vazquez, Freddy Noriega, Manolo Muñoz, Marco Antonio Muñiz, Dean Martin, Tito Puente, José Antonio Méndez, Diego El Cigala, Michael Bublé and Luis Miguel.

In 1970 he began developing a Biographical History of Mexico with Songs and Drawings. It took Luis Demetrio several decades of exhaustive work and consists of 86 songs that address events between pre-Hispanic times and different presidents of Mexico.

By 1981 Demetrio resumed his artistic activity with tours both in Mexico and abroad.

He produced the musical La Casa de Luis Demetrio (1991–1994) series and La Puerta de Luis Demetrio (1995–1997).

Demetrio died on December 17, 2007, in Cuernavaca, Morelos. On February 24, 2010, a bronze bust by sculptor Sergio Peraza Avila was unveiled at the Plaza de los Composers in Mexico City.

== Awards ==
In 1964 he received the Musa de Radiolandia award for Best Composer of the Year.

In 1965, he won the Trébol de Oro award for Best Sales, the Diosa de Plata Award in the 11th Mexican Television Contest, for Best Composer, and the Micrófono de Oro, awarded by the Mexican Association of Broadcasters, for Best Composer. Also in 1965, he won the Calendario Azteca, awarded by the Mexican Association of Journalists of Radio and Television (AMPRyT). That year he also won the WHON Trophy (New York); the Farándula Magazine, and the KWKW Award (Los Angeles, California).

In 1966 he received the Trébol de Oro Musart award for Best Sales of the Year and the Hebilla de Oro award for Best Artist of the Year (Canal 2, Panama).

== Notable songs ==
Luis Demetrio achieved international fame with songs like:

- ”Calendar”
- ”The Door”
- ”If God takes my life”
- ”Happiness”
- ”The glass of wine”
- ”I do not know I'm here”
- ”You are everything to me”
- “Sway”

== Influence ==
Demetrio songs have been featured in numerous films and telenovelas. His songs have been performed by artists such as:

- Rocío Dúrcal
- Lucho Gatica
- Olga Guillot
- Dámaso Pérez Prado
- Pedro Vargas
- Celia Cruz
- Javier Solís
- Dean Martin
- The Barry Sisters
- The Pussycat Dolls
