= Pablo Beltrán Ruiz =

Mexican composer and bandleader

Pablo Beltrán Ruiz (5 March 1915 - 29 July 2008) was a Mexican composer and bandleader, most famous for having composed, together with Mexican singer Luis Demetrio, the Spanish-language 1953 pop standard "¿Quién será?", whose English version is known as "Sway": it had its lyrics written by Norman Gimbel, and was an international hit by Dean Martin in 1954, and by Bobby Rydell in 1960. Other songs by Beltrán include "Picnic a Go-Go" and "La Sombra de tu Sonrisa" (both 1966), an instrumental version of "The Shadow of Your Smile".

== Biography ==
Pablo Beltrán Ruiz was born in 1915 to Ladislao Rosas and Felipa Rodríguez. He moved to Mexico City where he studied Law for one year and Chemistry for 3 years. He also studied music at the Escuela Libre de Música (Free School of Music) in Mexico, under the guidance of professor José Vázquez.

== Career ==
=== ¿Quién Será?/Sway ===
"¿Quién será la que me quiera a mí?" (meaning in English "Who will be the one to love me?" was recorded in 1953 by "Pablo Beltrán Ruiz y Su Orchestra" and was a minor hit before Dean Martin's 1954 release. It eventually became one of the best known Latin classics worldwide.

=== Other works ===
His music has been frequently used in soundtracks of a number of films such as: Escuela de vagabundos [School for Tramps] (1954) starring Pedro Infante and Miroslava Stern, ¡Paso a la juventud..! (1957) starring Tin Tan, México nunca duerme (1958) directed by Alejandro Galindo and Su Excelencia (1966) starring Mario Moreno "Cantinflas". Another notable work in this time was Caliente, Caliente ... A Go-Go (1966).

== Discography ==
- Cocktail Musical (RCA Victor, 1960)
- Regalos Musicales (RCA Victor, 1962)
- Bobby Capó with Pablo Beltran Ruiz, Mario Ruiz Armengol Y Chucho Zarzosa (RCA Victor, 1962)
- Caliente, Caliente ... A Go-Go (RCA Victor, 1966)
- El Baile Del Año (RCA Victor, 1967)
- Charleston with Ramón Márquez Carrillo, Pablo Beltran Ruiz, Tacos Jazz Band (Discos Rex, 1967)
- La Orquesta Cuic De Pablo Beltran Ruiz (RCA Victor, 1969)
