= ¿Quién será? =

Mexican song

Single by Pablo Beltrán y su Orquestra

from the album South of the Border / Al sur de la frontera - Cha-cha-cha
- Released: 1953
- Recorded: 1953
- Genre: Big band, cha-cha-chá
- Length: 2:08
- Label: RCA Victor
- Composer: Luis Demetrio
- Lyricist: Luis Demetrio

Audio video
- "¿Quién será?" on YouTube

"¿Quién será?" (English: "Who Will It Be?") is a bolero-mambo song written by Mexican composers Luis Demetrio and Pablo Beltrán Ruiz. Beltrán recorded the song for the first time with his orchestra in 1953. Pedro Infante, for whom the song was written, recorded it in 1954.

The first rendition of Luis Demetrio's "¿Quién será?" was recorded by Pablo Beltrán Ruiz with his orchestra as an instrumental cha-cha-chá in 1953. This version was later included on the LP South of the Border / Al sur de la frontera – Cha-cha-cha. According to Demetrio, Beltrán only contributed the first few chords of the song. The rest of the composition and the original lyrics (in Spanish) were all written by Demetrio. However, because Demetrio sold his rights to Beltrán, the song has often been misattributed to the latter.

Beltrán re-recorded the song on numerous occasions including an upbeat cumbia version for the album Mister Cumbia (1966), a ska version for the album Caliente, caliente... a go-go (1966) and a boogaloo version for the album Rosita bonita (1968), all released by RCA Victor. The cumbia version was featured in the 1967 Cantinflas film Su Excelencia.

Norman Gimbel took the song, removed the somewhat melancholy Spanish lyrics about a man wondering if he shall ever love again, and wrote brand-new English lyrics about a man praising his dancing partner's ability to affect his heart with how she "sways" when they dance. This new song, titled "Sway", has become a standard in the pop repertoire. The first version to achieve considerable success in the United States was recorded by singer Dean Martin with the Dick Stabile orchestra in 1954.

== Pedro Infante version ==
Demetrio had written the song specifically for Mexican singer Pedro Infante, who performed it in the film School for Tramps in 1954 and later recorded it for Peerless Records. It became one of Infante's signature songs and a hit across Latin America. Shortly after, Germán Valdés, better known as Tin Tan, performed a parody version of Infante's rendition in the film The Viscount of Monte Cristo.

== Dean Martin version ==
"Sway"

Single by Dean Martin

from the album Hey, Brother, Pour the Wine
- B-side: "Money Burns a Hole in My Pocket"
- Released: 1954
- Recorded: 1954
- Genre: Big band, pop
- Length: 2:42
- Label: Capitol
- Composer: Luis Demetrio
- Lyricist: Norman Gimbel
- Producer: Dick Stabile

Dean Martin singles chronology
| "Hey, Brother, Pour the Wine" (1954) | "Sway" (1954) | "Money Burns a Hole in my Pocket" (1954) |

Lyric video
- "Sway" on YouTube

In 1954, the English lyrics were written by Norman Gimbel and recorded by Dean Martin backed by Dick Stabile's orchestra. This recording reached number 15 on the Billboard magazine best-seller chart and number six on the UK chart. The single was released with the B-side "Money Burns a Hole in My Pocket" (Jule Styne, Bob Hilliard) in the US, while the British version was backed by "Pretty as a Picture" (Johnny Anz). The song was well received by critics, being described as a "happy reading of a listenable ditty in the Latin-American manner" by a contemporary reviewer. A version of his rendition is used in the trailer for the movie Operation Fortune: Ruse de Guerre (2022).

=== Charts ===
| Chart (1954) | Peak position |
|---|---|
| UK Singles (Official Charts) | 6 |
| US Billboard Best Sellers | 15 |

| Chart (2020) | Peak position |
|---|---|
| Hungary (Single Top 40) | 36 |

=== Certifications ===
| Region | Certification | Certified units/sales |
|---|---|---|
| United Kingdom (BPI) | Silver | 200,000^{‡} |
| United States (RIAA) | Gold | 500,000^{‡} |
^{‡} Sales+streaming figures based on certification alone.

== Bobby Rydell version ==
"Sway"

Single by Bobby Rydell

from the album Bobby's Biggest Hits
- B-side: "Groovy Tonight"
- Released: October 1960
- Recorded: 1960
- Genre: Pop
- Length: 2:16
- Label: Cameo
- Composer: Luis Demetrio
- Lyricist: Norman Gimbel
- Producer: Dick Stabile

Bobby Rydell singles chronology
| "Volare" (1960) | "Sway" (1960) | "Good Time Baby" (1961) |

In 1960, Bobby Rydell recorded the first of two hit versions of the song, reaching number 14 on the Billboard charts and number 12 in Canada. A disco re-recording in 1976 reached number 27 on the Adult Contemporary chart.

=== Charts ===
| Chart (1960–1961) | Peak position |
|---|---|
| Canada (CHUM) | 12 |
| US Billboard Hot 100 | 14 |

== Shaft version ==
"(Mucho Mambo) Sway"

Single by Shaft

from the album Pick Up on This
- Released: 23 August 1999
- Length: 3:42
- Label: Wonderboy; Universal
- Composer: Luis Demetrio
- Lyricist: Norman Gimbel
- Producers: Al and El

Shaft singles chronology
| "(Mucho Mambo) Sway" (1999) | "Mambo Italiano" (2000) |

British electronic music duo Shaft recorded "Sway", retitled as "(Mucho Mambo) Sway", and released it on 23 August 1999 as their debut single. This version is based on Rosemary Clooney's 1960 version, but following a dispute with the copyright holders of her recording, Shaft recorded new vocals with session singer Donna Canale. The single peaked at No. 2 on the UK Singles Chart, topped the New Zealand Singles Chart, and reached the top 10 in Denmark, Ireland, Norway, Sweden, and on the Canadian Singles Chart. The single was later included on Shaft's 2001 album Pick Up on This.

=== Background ===
"(Mucho Mambo) Sway" first gained attention after being featured in a television advertisement for London radio station Kiss FM. This recording was an updated version of Rosemary Clooney's 1960 version, featuring her vocals. The cover was set to be released, and many copies had already been mailed out, but the copyright holders of Clooney's version enacted a moratorium on the single to prohibit commercial usage. As a result, it was pulled from radio and television, and production of the single ceased, causing the original recording of "(Mucho Mambo) Sway" to become exponentially more valuable. Following the ban, Shaft recruited Donna Canale to sing the vocals on a new version of the song. This time, they were allowed to market the single, and two days after production was finished, it was sent to record shops.

=== Critical reception ===
Music Week called it a "swinging latin scorcher" and compared it to Lou Bega's "Mambo No. 5" which was released in the UK the week prior.

=== Charts ===
==== Weekly charts ====
| Chart (1999–2000) | Peak position |
|---|---|
| Australia (ARIA) | 28 |
| Canada (Nielsen SoundScan) | 4 |
| Canada Dance/Urban (RPM) | 10 |
| Denmark (IFPI) | 3 |
| Europe (Eurochart Hot 100) | 12 |
| Finland (Suomen virallinen lista) | 15 |
| France (SNEP) | 79 |
| Germany (GfK) | 92 |
| Iceland (Íslenski Listinn Topp 40) | 25 |
| Ireland (IRMA) | 8 |
| Italy (Musica e dischi) | 15 |
| Netherlands (Dutch Top 40) | 12 |
| Netherlands (Single Top 100) | 13 |
| New Zealand (Recorded Music NZ) | 1 |
| Norway (VG-lista) | 7 |
| Scottish Singles Sales (Official Charts) | 2 |
| Sweden (Sverigetopplistan) | 6 |
| Switzerland (Schweizer Hitparade) | 71 |
| UK Singles (Official Charts) | 2 |
| US Dance Singles Sales (Billboard) | 41 |

==== Year-end charts ====
| Chart (1999) | Position |
|---|---|
| Europe (Eurochart Hot 100) | 99 |
| Netherlands (Dutch Top 40) | 79 |
| New Zealand (RIANZ) | 29 |
| Sweden (Hitlistan) | 63 |
| UK Singles (OCC) | 45 |
| UK Airplay (Music Week) | 49 |
| UK Pop (Music Week) | 8 |

=== Certifications ===
| Region | Certification | Certified units/sales |
|---|---|---|
| New Zealand (RMNZ) | Gold | 5,000^{*} |
| United Kingdom (BPI) | Gold | 400,000^{‡} |
^{*} Sales figures based on certification alone.^{‡} Sales+streaming figures based on certification alone.

== Michael Bublé version ==
"Sway"

Single by Michael Bublé

from the album Michael Bublé
- Released: 22 June 2004
- Genre: Latin pop; bolero; marimba
- Length: 3:08
- Label: 143; Reprise
- Composer: Luis Demetrio
- Lyricist: Norman Gimbel
- Producers: Humberto Gatica; David Foster

Michael Bublé singles chronology
| "Kissing a Fool" (2003) | "Sway" (2004) | "Spider-Man Theme" (2004) |

Visualizer video
- "Sway" on YouTube

"Sway" was covered by Canadian singer Michael Bublé for his debut studio album, Michael Bublé, released in 2003. Sway was chosen for release as the album's third single, and was released in Australia on 22 June 2004.

Sway was only released as an individual single in Australia. In many other countries, the release of the track was held back until 26 July, and packaged as a double A-side with the album's fourth single, Spider-Man Theme. However, due to its popularity with Australian radio stations, the track was given a separate release in the region, with Spider-Man Theme being released three months later in September 2004, as a separate release. Bublé's version of the song has appeared in such television shows and films as Las Vegas, CSI: NY, Malcolm in the Middle, The Wedding Date, Da Kath and Kim Code and No Reservations. The music video for the track was directed by Peter Kasden, who also filmed a music video for the single's B-side, Moondance, which was released exclusively to Australian music channels to promote the release of the single. The video features scenes of Bublé performing the song in the studio, intercut with scenes of Bublé driving a car through the Australian outback. The separate release, two music videos and strong radio airplay meant that Sway reached a peak of No. 15 on the ARIA Singles Chart, making it Bublé's highest-charting single at the time on the chart.

=== Track listing ===
- Australian CD single
1. "Sway" (Junkie XL Mix) – 3:46
2. "Sway" (acoustic version) – 3:08
3. "Moondance" (live version) – 3:45

=== Charts ===
| Chart (2004) | Peak position |
|---|---|
| Australia (ARIA) | 15 |
| US Adult Contemporary (Billboard) | 24 |

=== Certifications ===
| Region | Certification | Certified units/sales |
|---|---|---|
| New Zealand (RMNZ) | Gold | 15,000^{‡} |
| United Kingdom (BPI) | Silver | 200,000^{‡} |
^{‡} Sales+streaming figures based on certification alone.

== The Pussycat Dolls version ==
"Sway"

Promotional single by The Pussycat Dolls

from the album Shall We Dance?
- Released: 2004
- Recorded: 2004
- Genre: Latin pop; R&B
- Length: 3:10
- Label: A&M
- Composer: Luis Demetrio
- Lyricist: Norman Gimbel
- Producer: Ron Fair

Audio video
- "Sway" on YouTube

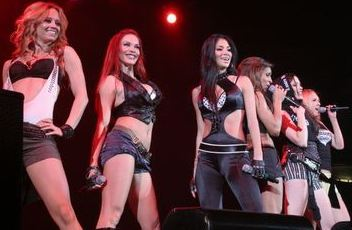
The Pussycat Dolls in 2006

American girl group the Pussycat Dolls recorded "Sway" for the soundtrack to the 2004 film Shall We Dance?. It was later included as an international bonus track on their debut studio album PCD (2005).

=== Critical reception ===
While reviewing the Shall We Dance? soundtrack, Heather Phares cited "Sway" as one of the highlights of the album. Ashley Spencer from the Orlando Sentinel described the rendition as having a "mesmerizing rhythm". While reviewing the DVD of Shall We Dance? Renata Joy of Dvdizzy.com pointed the song out as "a catchy tune". Rachel Sexton of MovieFreak.com called the cover "great" and noted it as "a classic updated".

=== Promotion ===
The music video for "Sway" was directed by Steve Antin, the brother of The Pussycat Dolls creator, Robin Antin. The video features The Pussycat Dolls dancing against a backdrop of scenes from the movie. The music video was included as bonus clip in the DVD release of Shall We Dance. At that point, the Pussycat Dolls were still recording their album PCD, and the group featured members of the original Pussycat Dolls burlesque troupe who remained after the re-casting process, such as Robin Antin, Cyia Batten, Kasey Campbell and Kaya Jones. Reviewers for Comingsoon.net, Edward Douglas and Scott Chitwood described the video as "sexy" and "stylish". They also wrote that "it perfectly fits the mood of the film." Slant Magazine's writer Ed Gonzales wondered if the editors of Maxim financed the video. Rachel Sexton of MovieFreak.com suggested buyers to skip the video calling it "cheesy". Renata Joy of Dvdizzy.com noted that "the song is much more enjoyable when not watching the accompanying video." "Sway" was performed on Dancing with the Stars along with "Don't Cha" during the results show on 27 January 2006.

=== Track listing ===
Promotional CD single

1. "Sway" – 3:10

=== Personnel ===
Credits adapted from the liner notes of the soundtrack Shall We Dance?.

- Nicole Scherzinger – lead vocals, background vocals
- Carmit Bachar – additional vocals
- Melody Thornton – additional vocals
- Kaya Jones – additional vocals
- Ron Fair – producer, marimba
- Bill Reichenbach – trombone
- Tony Terran – trumpet

== Other versions ==
"¿Quién será?" and "Sway" have been recorded dozens of times by many artists over the decades, many of which have been included in feature films and TV episodes. This is merely a select list of popular recordings, not a comprehensive listing.

- 1954 – Marie José – as "C'est si doux"
- 1959 – Klavdiya Shulzhenko – as "Кто ты?"
- 1960 – Connie Francis – Connie Francis Sings Spanish and Latin American Favorites, MGM Records
- 1960 – Rosemary Clooney and Dámaso Pérez Prado – A Touch of Tabasco, RCA Victor
- 1963 – Julie London – Latin in a Satin Mood, Liberty Record
- 1965 – Cliff Richard – Cliff Richard, Columbia Records
- 1976 — Nada Knežević — Želim Da Sam S Tobom
- 1997 – Brent Spiner on the soundtrack of the movie Out to Sea
- 1998 – The film Dark City, featured the version by Anita Kelsey, lip-synched by Jennifer Connelly's character as a lounge act (Jennifer Connelly herself sang it in the Director's Cut)
- 2005 – The documentary film Romántico, directed by Mark Becker, features a version of the song played by Arturo Arias and Carmelo Muñiz
- 2005 – The film The Wedding Date, directed by Clare Kilner, features the version by Michael Bublé
- 2008 – The film Paris, directed by Cédric Klapisch, features the version by Pérez Prado and Rosemary Clooney
- 2008 – The film Revolutionary Road, directed by Sam Mendes
- 2010 – The film Repo Men, directed by Miguel Sapochnik, features the version by Pérez Prado and Rosemary Clooney
