= 4 Strings =

Dutch vocal trance music group

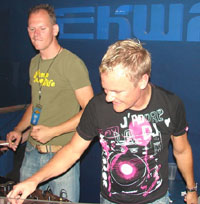

Background information
- Origin: Numansdorp, Netherlands
- Genres: Trance; Vocal Trance; Uplifting Trance; progressive trance
- Occupations: DJs; record producers
- Years active: 2000–present
- Labels: Liquid Recordings; Spinnin' Records; Ultra Records
- Members: Carlo Resoort; Jan De Vos

4 Strings is a Dutch vocal trance group. The group was founded by Carlo Resoort and Jan De Vos.

Their biggest success came with the track "Take Me Away (Into the Night)", which peaked at number 15 in the UK Singles Chart in May 2002. In total, 4 Strings had five different singles in the UK chart between December 2000 and July 2004.

Vanessa van Hemert was originally portrayed as the main vocalist of the group. However, it was revealed on 5 April 2019 that Susanne Teutenberg was actually the vocalist behind most of the songs from the first two albums from 2002 to 2005. This was confirmed by Susanne herself on her Facebook page, and by 4 Strings on their Twitter page, with the other vocalists being Nikola Materne and Janson Lunar. It was then revealed that van Hemert only appeared lip-syncing in their live performances and videos between 2002 and 2005, never providing vocals on any of their tracks. Susanne's first official song with 4 Strings was "A Brand New Day", which was released in 2019, and her first live performance was on the festival Tranceformations on 8 February 2020.

== Discography ==
=== Studio albums ===
- Believe (2003)
- Turn It Around (2004)
- Mainline (2006)
- Sunset Aftermath (2017)
- A Brand New Day (2020)

=== Charting singles ===
List of singles, with selected chart positions
Title	Year	Peak chart positions		
Title	Year	AUS	UK	US Dance Airplay
"Daytime"	2000	—	48	—
"(Take Me Away) Into the Night"	2002	44	15	39
"Diving"	2002	54	38	39
"Let It Rain"	2003	—	49	12
"Turn It Around"	2004	—	50	—
"Until You Love Me"	2005	—	—	21
"Curious"	2007	—	—	17
