= Shaft (British electronic duo) =

English electronic music production duo

- Origin: Brighton, England
- Genres: Electronic, house, Latin house, big beat
- Years active: 1997–2001; 2015–present
- Labels: Wonderboy Records, Universal, Nitelite Records, Jellybean Recordings, Urban
- Past members: Alex Rizzo; Elliot Ireland
- Website: Discogs.com

Shaft are an English electronic music production duo, known for their covers and remixes of "(Mucho Mambo) Sway" and "Mambo Italiano". The former entered and peaked at number two on the UK Singles Chart in August 1999, then reached number one on New Zealand's Recorded Music NZ chart in December. They followed this with the release of "Mambo Italiano" (vocal by Donna Canale), which peaked at number twelve on the UK Singles Chart but ultimately did not replicate the success of the previous single. They went on to tour the world and win a gold disc for best performing group. Since then, they have recorded more songs such as "Kiri Riri Boom" and "Shake Seniora".

== History ==
Rizzo and Ireland operated, as did many dance record producers, under various guises. Before Shaft was Skeewiff. Their formative period in the music industry came with a spell working at the Power Studios in Acton. They undertook remixes for Björk and produced tracks for Alison Limerick and Schooly D, then began work on the first Skeewiff album, released on their own label, Jalapeño Records (teaming up with Ministry of Sound's FSUK label). As Skeewiff, their mix of "Man of Constant Sorrow" was ranked 96 in the Triple J Hottest 100, 2003, released on Volume 11, disc 1 track 20. After changing their name to Shaft, they signed to Wonderboy Records in 1999. The year after, they joined Head On Management, where Phil Nicholas, together with Head On directors Guy Trezise and Steve Baker, currently represent them.

Having acquired a home-based recording studio, the duo compiled a database of samples and sound clips. Their biggest hit originated there with a sample of the Perez Prado song "Sway", which became "(Mucho Mambo) Sway". The original version featured a vocal sample of Rosemary Clooney, but Rizzo and Ireland were unable to clear the sample, therefore, the vocals on the final track were sung by session singer Donna Canale. "(Mucho Mambo) Sway" reached number 2 in the UK in August, kept off the number-one spot by Lou Bega's version of "Mambo No. 5", also based on a Prado song. Outside the UK, the song was also a top 10 hit in Ireland, Sweden and Norway, as well as reaching number 15 in Finland and number 28 in Australia. Its most successful performance on the music charts, however, occurred in New Zealand, where the song reached the top spot on 12 December 1999, becoming one of the last number-one singles of the 1990s and the 20th century. Despite its charting at the end of the year, it still managed to become New Zealand's 29th best-selling single of 1999. Shaft's next single, "Mambo Italiano", was less successful, charting at number 12 in the United Kingdom, number 17 in Australia (becoming Shaft's most successful single there), and number 22 in Sweden. It did not chart in New Zealand. They had one more chart hit in the UK, "Kiri Riri Boom", which peaked at number 62 in July 2001.

"Wassuup!", a collage of the Budweiser advertisement catchphrase and the Rick James track "Super Freak", used by MC Hammer on "U Can't Touch This", was then released under the Da Muttz moniker.

== Discography ==
=== Albums ===
- Da Album (2001) – as Da Muttz
- Pick Up on This (2001)

=== Singles ===
Year	Title	Peak chart positions										Certifications	Album
Year	Title	UK	AUS	EUR	FIN	FRA	IRE	NED	NZ	SCO	SWE	Certifications	Album
1999	"(Mucho Mambo) Sway"	2	28	12	15	79	8	13	1	2	6	BPI: Gold; RMNZ: Platinum	Pick Up on This
2000	"Mambo Italiano"	12	17	41	—	—	33	—	—	14	22	ARIA: Gold	Pick Up on This
2000	"Wassuup!" (as Da Muttz)	11	12	—	11	2	20	—	—	14	17	ARIA: Gold	Da Album
2001	"Kiki Riri Boom"	62	—	—	—	—	—	—	—	81	—		Pick Up on This
2001	"Shake Seníora"	—	—	—	—	—	—	—	—	—	—		Pick Up on This
2009	"(Mucho Mambo) Sway 2009"	—	—	—	—	—	—	51	—	—	—		Non-album singles
2017	"Mambo Italiano" (DJ Sunny 2K17 Mash Up)	—	—	—	—	—	—	—	—	—	—		Non-album singles
"—" denotes items that did not chart or were not released in that territory.
