= Dario Moreno =

Turkish-Jewish singer (1921–1968)

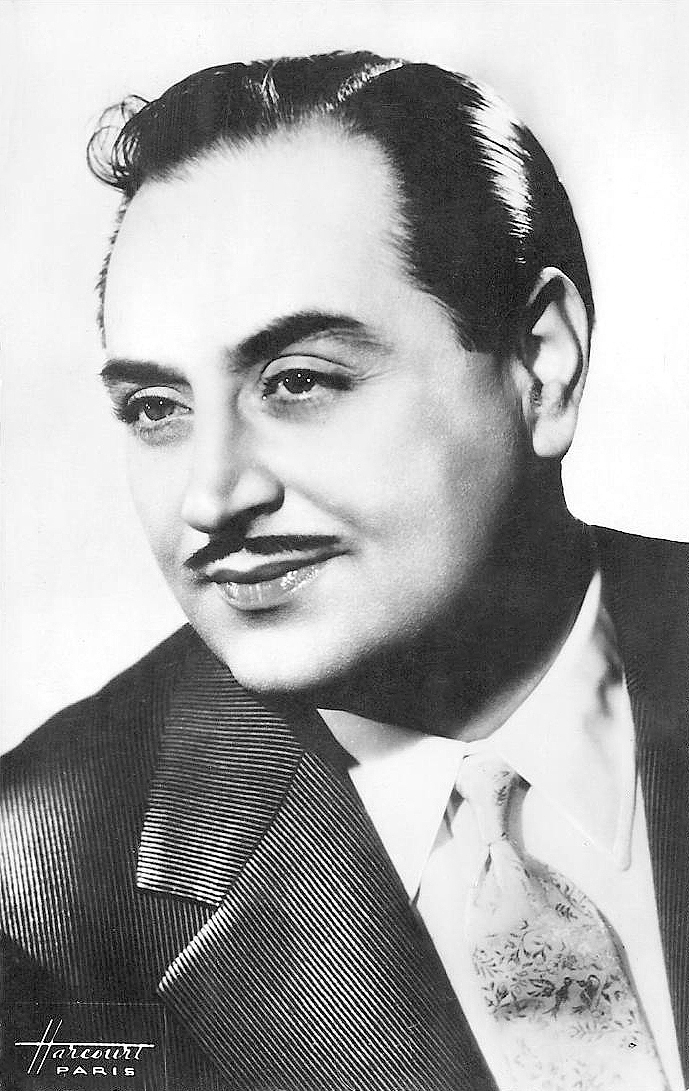
- Moreno in 1952
- Born: 3 April 1921; Aydın Vilayet, Ottoman Empire (modern-day Aydın, Turkey)
- Died: 1 December 1968 (aged 47); Istanbul, Turkey
- Occupations: Singer, composer, lyricist, Guitarist, Film Actor

David Arugete (Hebrew: דריו מורנו; 3 April 1921 – 1 December 1968), commonly known under his stage name Dario Moreno, was a Turkish-Jewish polyglot singer, an accomplished composer, lyricist, and guitarist. He attained fame and made a remarkable career centred in France which also included films, during the 1950s and the 1960s. He became famous with his 1961 song Brigitte Bardot.

== Biography ==
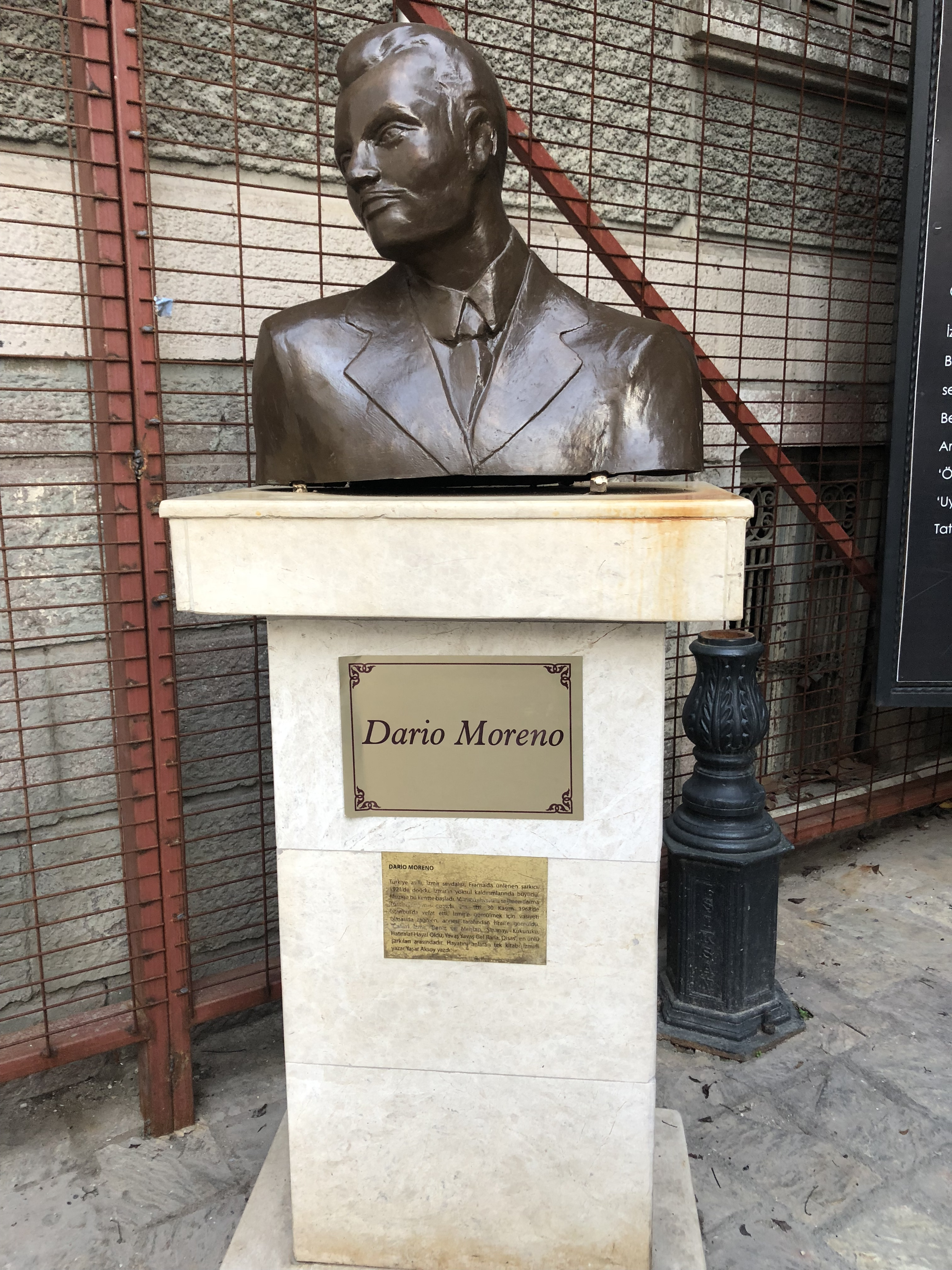
Bust of Dario Moreno in İzmir

Dario Moreno was born to a large Turkish-Jewish family. He was orphaned in early childhood when his father, who worked at the train station in Aydın, was shot dead under tragic circumstances. He was placed in the Sephardic orphanage of Izmir (Nido De Guerfanos) by his mother and remained there until he was four.

After a primary education in the Jewish educational establishments of Izmir, he had many odd jobs during his early youth. He put great effort into continuing his education while simultaneously working to make a living. He started working as an errand boy in the law firm of the city's prominent lawyers and was eventually trained to become an office clerk. In the evenings, he would study French in Izmir's Central Library. With a guitar that had fallen into his hands by chance, he also learned to play the guitar, mainly on his own with occasional tutoring from acquaintances.

He started singing at Bar Mitzvah celebrations as a second job. In his early twenties, he had already become a well-known singer in Izmir, and particularly among the Jewish community. During his military service in the Turkish Army, he was employed as a singer in officers' quarters in various garrisons and became more focused on music. His first truly professional musical performance started in his hometown after his discharge and was arranged through army connections. After he started making money from his music, he moved to the better-off Jewish quarter of Karataş and lived in a house in a street leading to the historic Asansör, one of the city's landmark buildings (whose name means the "Elevator" since it carried people by elevator to the upper part of the quarter which was separated from the lower coastal area by a steep slope). Nowadays, this street is named Dario Moreno Sokağı (Dario Moreno Street) after him.

Darío Moreno died of a heart attack after an argument between him and a member of the gate staff at Atatürk Airport in İstanbul. He was slightly late for a flight to Paris where he was going to give a concert and attend the first "Turkish Night" to take place in the French capital. The member of staff did not allow him to board the plane leading to a serious argument. Subsequently, 47-year-old Moreno had a heart attack. According to his will he wanted to be buried in İzmir, Turkey. Instead his mother Madam Roza had him buried in Holon, Israel.

== Ya Mustafa ==
"Ya Mustafa" is one of the best remembered of Moreno's songs. It was very famous in the 1950s and early 1960s. The original version of this catchy song and the identity of its composer are disputed. It appeared in one of the films of the Egyptian actor Ismail Yassin in the 1950s, and in another Egyptian film of Sabah from the same era. Dario Moreno performed it in the late 1950s. In Europe, the song became popular with the help of Bob Azzam (a Lebanese singer who was born in Egypt in 1925 and died in Monte Carlo in 2004), who released it in 1960 in France with lyrics consisting of at least 3 languages: "Chérie je t'aime, chéri je t'adore – come la salsa del pomodoro" (Darling, I love you, darling, I adore you – like tomato sauce). Bruno Gigliotti, (Orlando) the brother of famous singer Dalida, also covered the song. This song, with its polyglot lyrics, can be considered a historical documentation of the cosmopolitan era in the Egyptian city of Alexandria. During that era, a large cosmopolitan polyglot community, mainly Turks, Greeks, Jews, Armenians and Italians, lived in the Egyptian city. A sizable portion lived in the Attareen district, where the events of the song take place.

== Films ==
- No Vacation for Mr. Mayor (1951) – Le maharadjah
- Deux de l'escadrille (1953)
- Le salaire de la peur (1953) (by Henri-Georges Clouzot with Yves Montand, Charles Vanel and Peter van Eyck) – Hernandez
- Sins of Paris (1953)
- La môme vert-de-gris (1953) (by Bernard Borderie with Eddie Constantine, Howard Vernon, Dominique Wilms and Maurice Ronet) – Joe Madrigal
- Quay of Blondes (1954) (by Paul Cadéac with Michel Auclair) – Lucky
- The Women Couldn't Care Less (1954) – Perera, the Head Waiter
- The Sheep Has Five Legs (1954) – Un matelot américain
- Forgive Us Our Trespasses (1956)
- Burning Fuse (1957) – Jeff
- An Eye for an Eye (1957) – Le cafetier de Toluma
- Anyone Can Kill Me (1957, by Henri Decoin with Anouk Aimée) – Luigi Falconi
- Incognito (1958) – Fernando
- La femme et le Pantin (1959) (by Julien Duvivier with Brigitte Bardot) – Arabadjian
- Oh! que mambo (1959) (by John Berry with Magali Noël) – Miguel Montero
- Marie of the Isles (1959) (by Georges Combret with Belinda Lee) – Desmarais – le traître
- Nathalie, Secret Agent (1959) – Docteur Alberto / Don José
- Voulez-vous danser avec moi ? (1959) (by Michel Boisrond with Henri Vidal, Brigitte Bardot and Noël Roquevert) – Florès
- Touchez pas aux blondes (1960) – Rodinoff
- Candide ou l'Optimisme au XXe siècle (1960) (by Norbert Carbonnaux with Jean-Pierre Cassel and Daliah Lavi) – Un dictateur sud américain / South American Dictator
- The Revolt of the Slaves (1960) – Massimiano
- Tintin et le mystère de la toison d'or (1961) (by Jean-Jacques Vierne with Charles Vanel and Georges Wilson) – Midas Papos
- Le tout pour le tout (1962) (by Patrice Dally with Karen Blanguernon and Dirk Sanders)
- The Merry Widow (1962) – Camillo, Valenciennes Mann
- El hub keda (1962)
- Les femmes d'abord (1963) – L'aubergiste
- No temas a la ley (1963) – Bruno Suárez
- Le bon Roi Dagobert (1963) (by Pierre Chevalier with Fernandel and Gino Cervi) – Charibert – le frère de Dagobert
- Le dernier tiercé (1964) – Guido
- Dis-moi qui tuer (1965) – Pitou
- Hotel Paradiso (1966) – The Turk
- The Saint Lies in Wait (1966)
- La Prisonnière (1968) – Sala (final film role)

== Albums ==
- Granada- Adios Amigos
- Bossa Nova
- Calypso
- Le coco
- Canım İzmir
- Si Tu Vas A Rio / Viens
- Long Bos
- Moreno Poy poy
- Mulata Ye Ye Ye
- Hatıralar Hayal Oldu / Olam Boyun Kurbanı
- Tropical Dario
- Oh Que Dario

== Awards ==
- 1958 Grand Prix Du Disque in France

== See also ==
- Avrasya Anı Evi
