= Asansör =

Building in İzmir, Turkey

Coordinates: 38.408798°N 27.117489°E

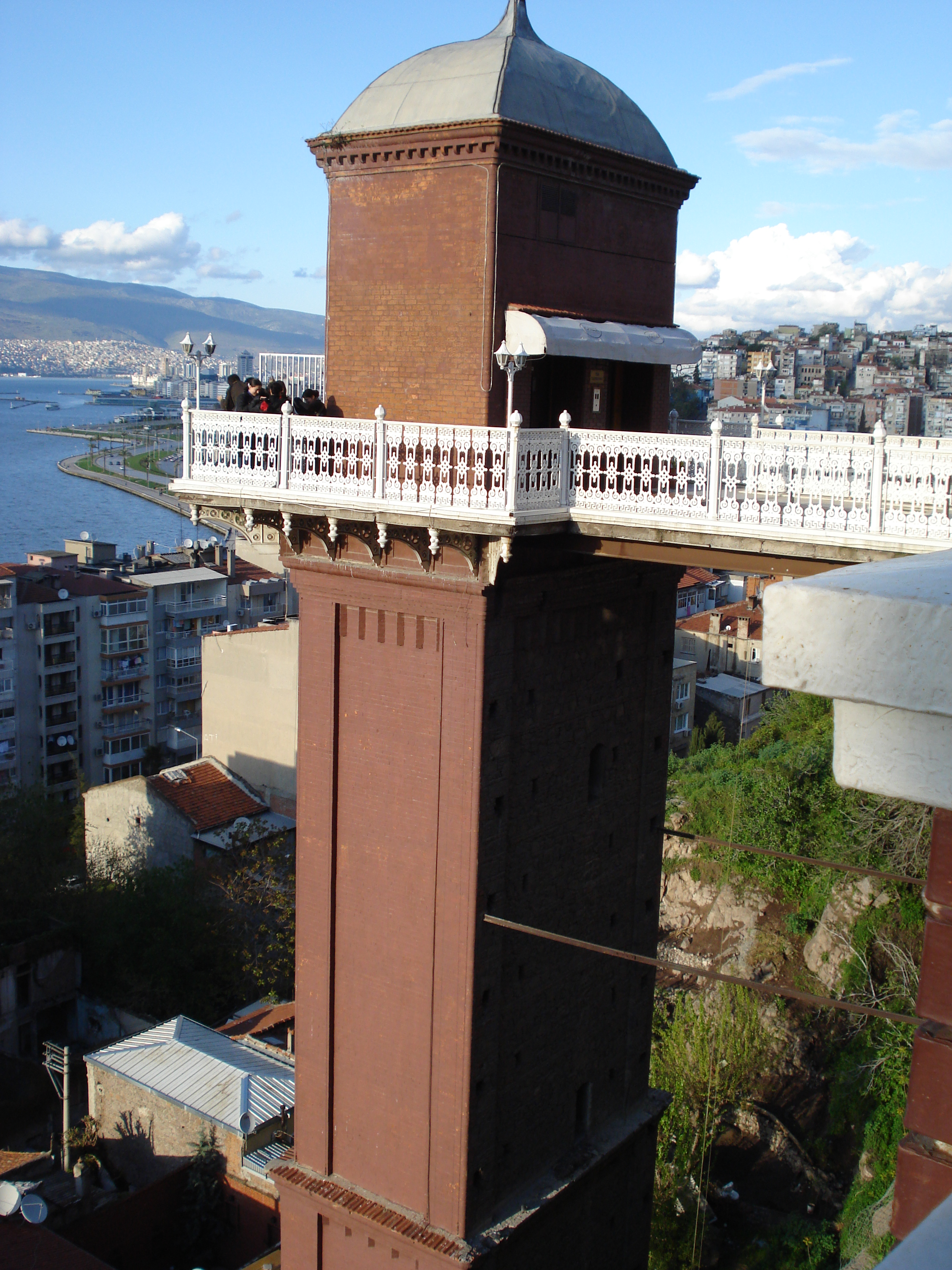
Asansör in Konak, İzmir

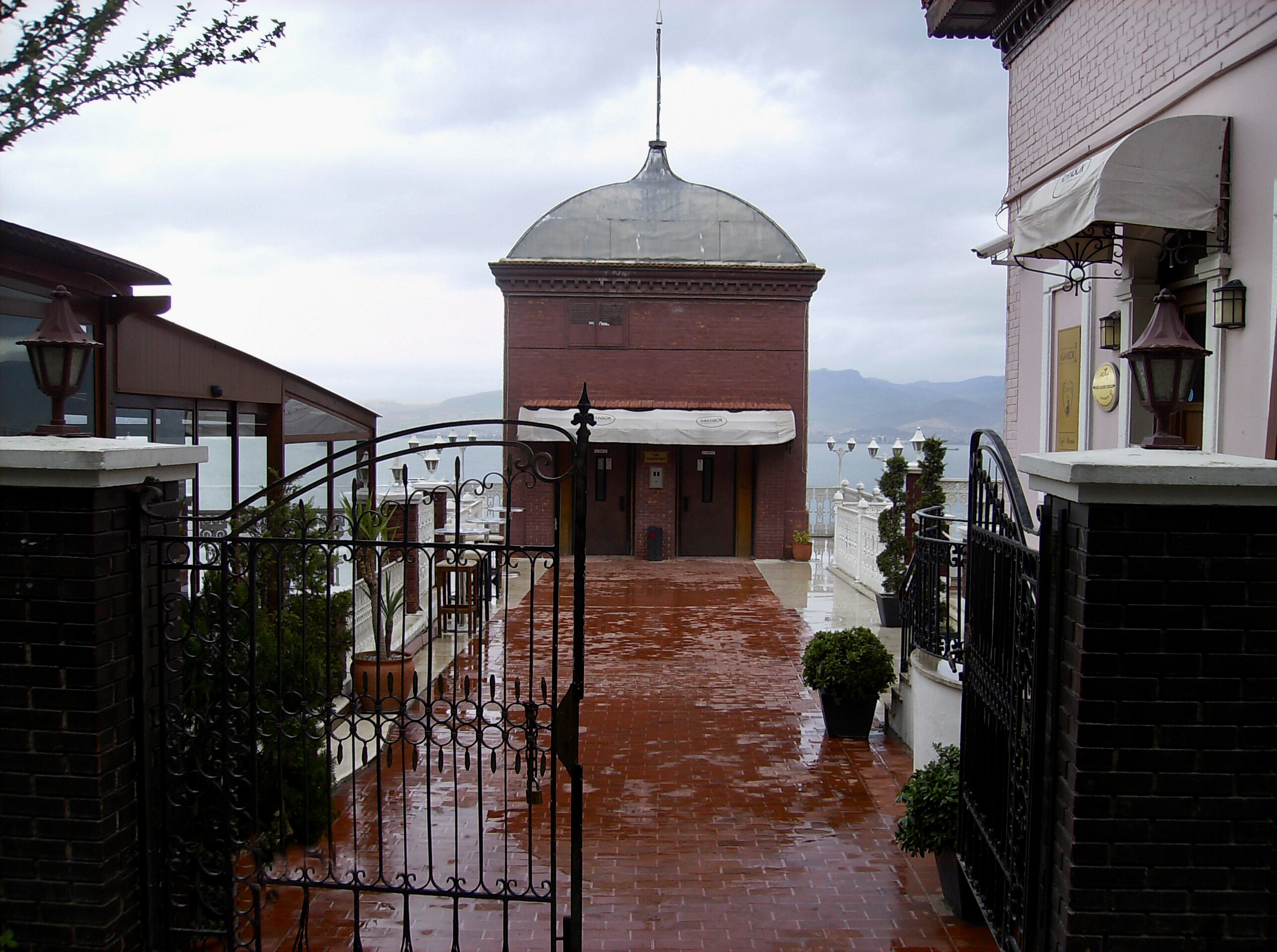
The observation terrace of Asansör

Asansör (Turkish for "elevator", derived from the French word ascenseur) is a historical building in İzmir's Karataş quarter, within the boundaries of the metropolitan district of Konak. It was built in 1907 as a work of public service by a wealthy Jewish banker and trader of that period, Nesim Levi Bayraklıoğlu, in order to ease passage from the narrow coastline of Karataş to the hillside, the elevator within the building serving to carry people and goods through the steep cliff between the two parts of the quarter.

In time, the small street that led to the building also came to be known under the same name, Asansör Street (Asansör Sokağı). In the 1940s, one of the residents of the street was the singer Darío Moreno, who was to attain fame later.

It was recently restored and since then, became one of the landmarks of İzmir. The street was renamed Darío Moreno Street in memory of the singer.

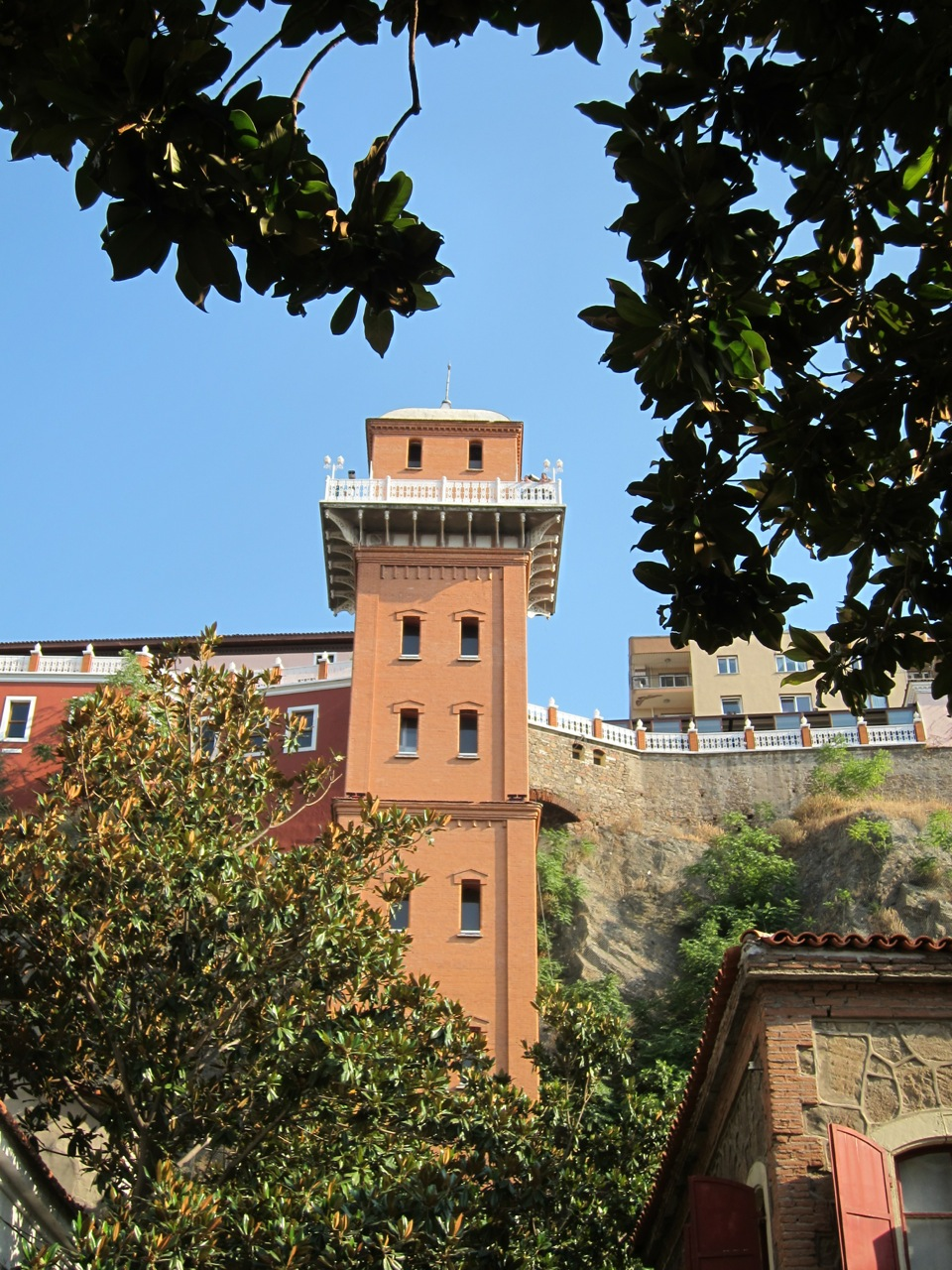
View of Asansör from Darío Moreno Street

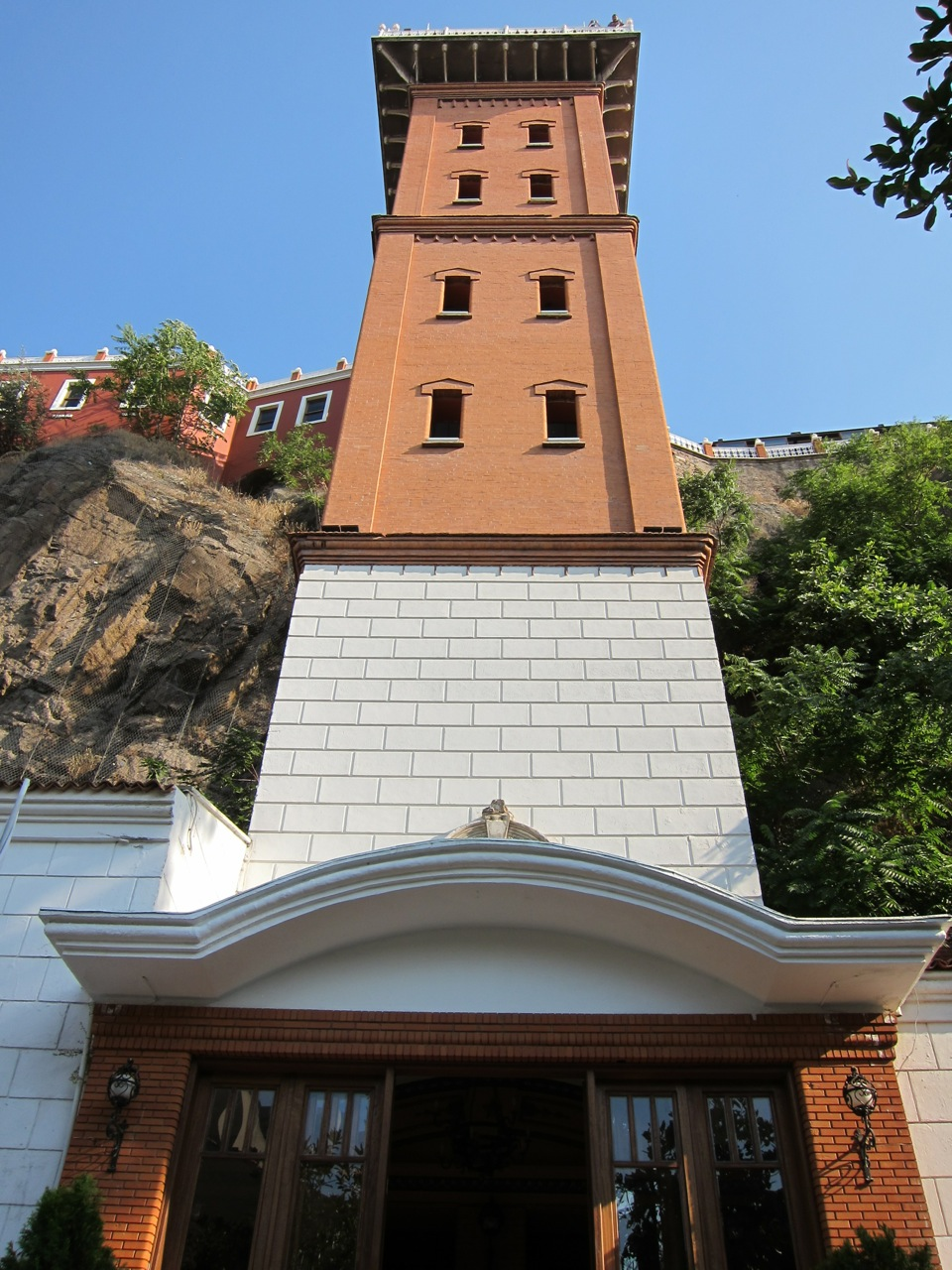
Looking up at the Asansör tower

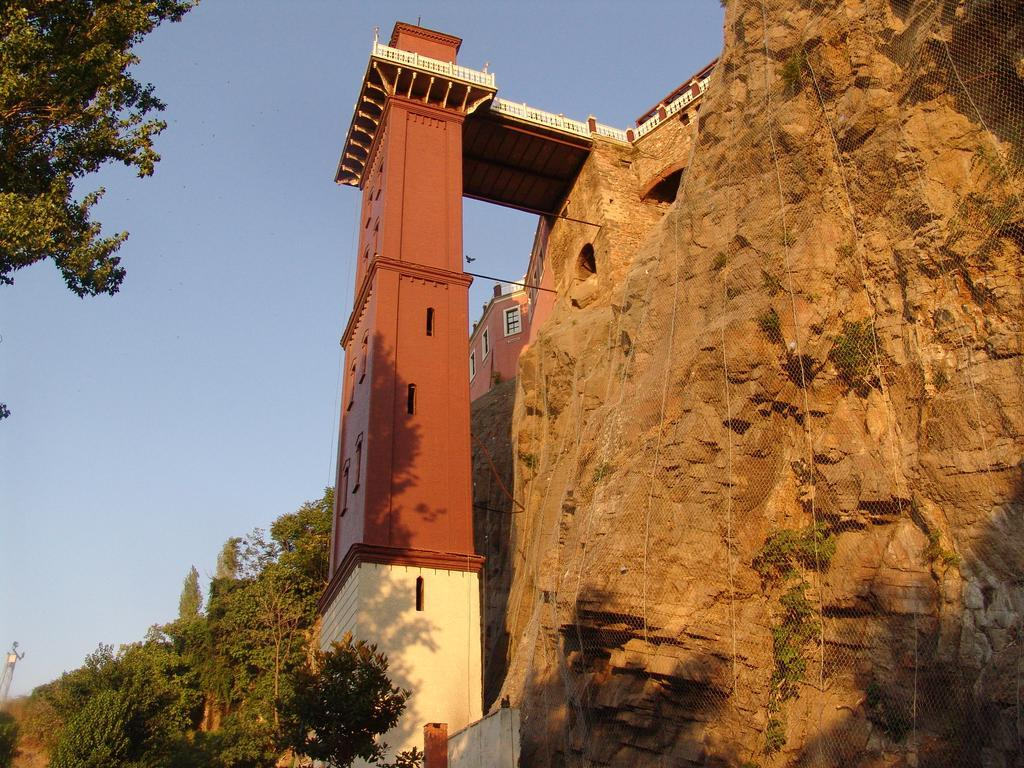
Asansör side view

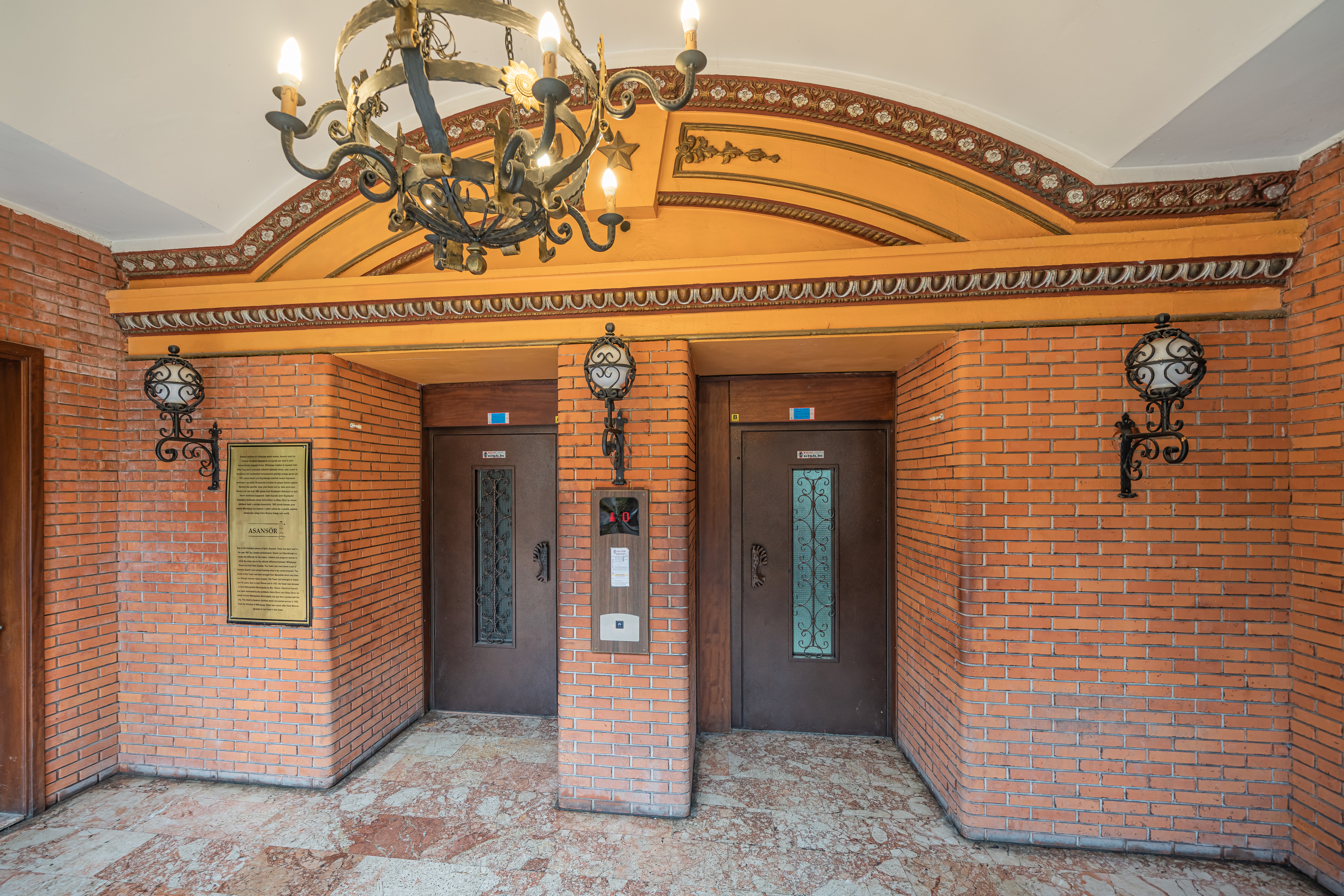
Entrance hall

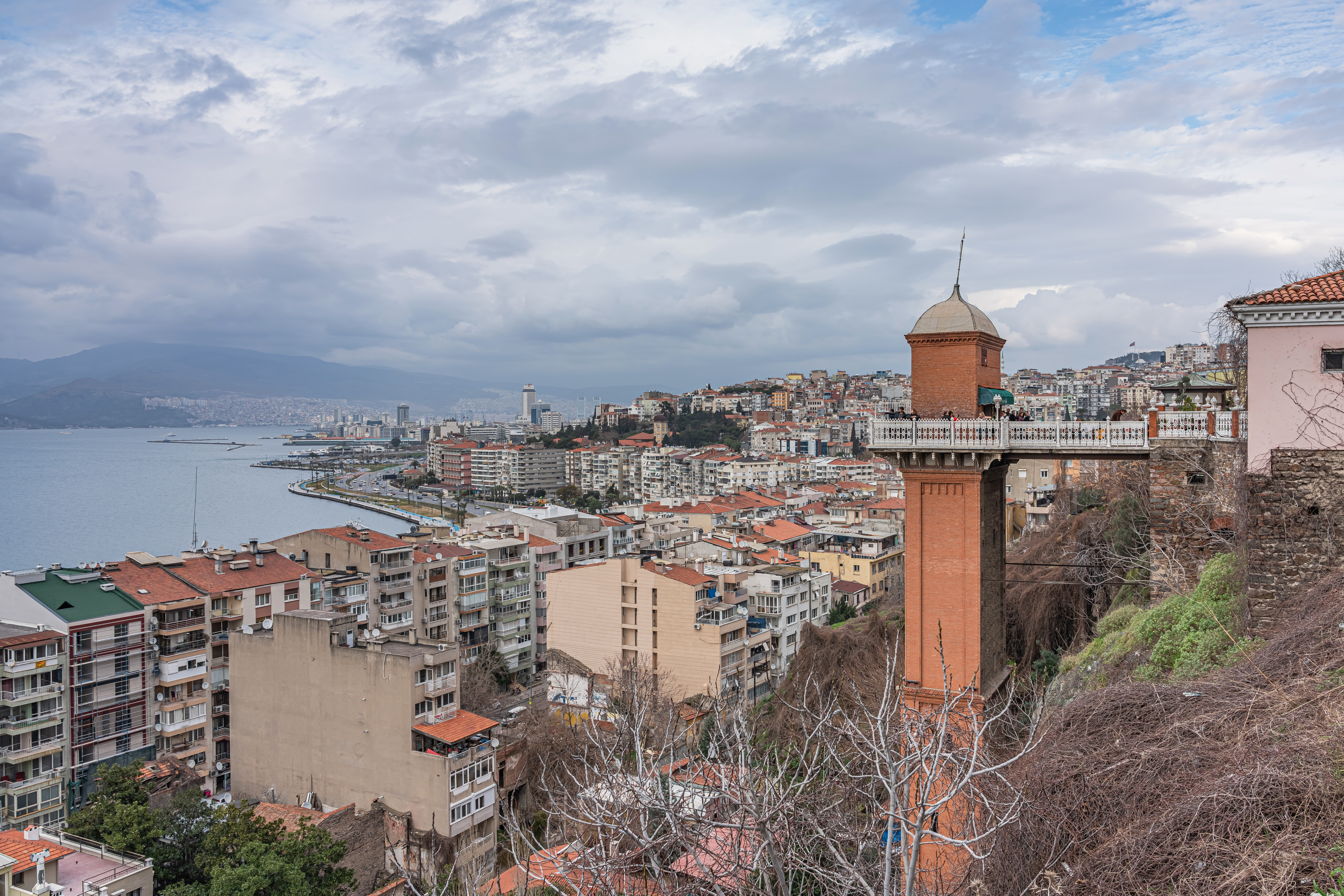
View from the top of the Asansör in İzmir.
