= Wonderboy Records =

Wonderboy Records was a British dance music record label and a subsidiary of Decca Music (and the parent label Universal Music). The label was active from 1995 to 2003. The brand was briefly resurrected for one release in 2005.

== Releases ==
Cat #	Artist	Title	Year	UK Chart Position
WB001	Coma B	Have Fun	1995	95
WB002	Level	Good Morning	1997	Promo Only
WB003	Souvlaki	Inferno	1997	24
WB004	Magic Alec pres Resonance	Resonance	1997	104
WB005	Ariel	Deep (I'm Falling Deeper)	1997	47
WB006	Whoosh	Whoosh	1997	72
WB007				
WB008	Convert	Nightbird	1998	45
WB009	Souvlaki	My Tume	1998	63
WB010	WestBam Vs Red Jerry	Wizards Of The Sonic	1998	43
WB011	Klubbheads	Kickin' Hard	1998	36
WB012	A.T.G.O.C.	Repeated Love	1998	31
WB013	Cevin Fisher	(You Got Me) Burning Up	1999	14
WB014	Azaman	Celebration	1998	38
WB015	Shaft	(Mucho Mambo) Sway	1999	2
WB016	Alena	Turn It Around	1999	14
WB017	Shaft	Mambo Italiano	2000	12
WB018	The Music Makers	I'm The Music Tonite	2000	7^{[A]}
WB019	Plasma feat Berri	Do You Believe	2000	Did Not Chart
WB020	Barry White	Let The Music Play	2000	45
WB021	Jorio feat Cyberdiva	Remember Me	2001	54
WB022	Cevin Fisher	It's A Good Life	2001	54
WB023				
WB024	Nick Beat	Technodisco	2001	112
WB025	The Three Amigos	25 Miles	2001	30
WB026	Shaft	Kiki Riri Boom	2001	62
WB027	Ed Case & Shelley Nelson	Find A Way	2001	Promo Only
WB028	Andre Neumann feat Sheryl Jay	First Picture	2001	Did Not Chart
WB029	Yahel	Devotion	2002	Promo Only
WB030	Plasma	Imagination	2002	Promo Only
986-803	XTM & DJ Chucky pres Annia	Give Me Your Love	2005	28
Album	Shaft	Pick Up On This	2001	Did Not Chart
	Madelyne	A Deeper Love	2001	Sampler
	Shaft	Shake Senora	2001	Promo Only
	Protect The Innocent	Body Talk (Talk 2 Me)	2003	Promo Only
	Shake B4 Use Vs Robert Palmer	Addicted To Love	2003	Released through Serious Records

== Notes ==
- A This release was ineligible for the UK Singles Chart due to being over 20 minutes in length and instead charted on the UK Budget Album Chart.
